= Lake Alice =

Lake Alice may refer to:

== New Zealand ==
- Lake Alice (Manawatū-Whanganui), a lake
  - Lake Alice, Manawatū-Whanganui, a geographic area
  - Lake Alice Hospital
- Lake Alice (Southland), a lake

== United States ==
- Lake Alice (Gainesville, Florida), a lake on the campus of the University of Florida
- Lake Alice (Hubbard County, Minnesota), a lake
  - Lake Alice Township, Hubbard County, Minnesota, a small community
- Lake Alice (South Dakota), a lake
- Lake Alice (Texas), or Lake Findley, a reservoir
- Lake Alice (Washington), a lake
- Lake Alice (Wyoming), a lake

== Italy ==
- Lago di Alice (Lake Alice), a lake in Italy

== See also ==
- Alice Lake (disambiguation)
