= Stanmore Road Boys Home =

Stanmore Road Boys' Home, also known as Christchurch Boys' Home, was a residential home for boys, located at 300 Stanmore Road, Christchurch, New Zealand.

== History ==
Stanmore Road Boys' Home, for boys aged from 10 - 16 years old, was operational from 1930 until 1988. It was controlled by the New Zealand Education Department until 1972, and then by the Department of Social Welfare until its closure. It was a regional boys home that took referrals from Nelson, Blenheim, the West Coast, Canterbury and south to Timaru. In 1988, residents were moved to Kingslea, a home in Christchurch which had originally been for girls only.

Boys from Stanmore Road Boys' Home attended the Christchurch Winter Show and Exhibition in King Edward Barracks in August 1930 along with children from several other orphanages across the city, where presentations were made for them including gymnastics and a Punch and Judy show.

Resident Gordon McCarthy (1929-1942) lost his life in January 1942 when he drowned at North Beach in Christchurch while swimming with three others.

A group of boys from the home was welcomed aboard the USS Arneb while it was berthed at Lyttleton Harbour in March 1962. They were shown around the harbour in the captain's launch, 'plied with refreshments and shown films'. On their departure, the manager of the home, Mr. B. Kean, was presented with a cheque by 'Captain C. Bobgzincki' and the crew for camping equipment for the boys of the home.

In May 1978, a boy absconded from the home and was later charged with unlawful taking of cars and a cheque offence. In July 1980, eight boys absconded from the home and were later charged with car conversion and burglary.

In the 1980s, Ngāi Tahu leader William Joseph (Joe) Karetai (1928 - 1987) was involved with the governance of the home.

Mr. Brian Zygadlo (1932-2014) was the principal of Stanmore Boys' Home in September 1982. He advised The Press at this time that he was 'totally against punitive punishment'. For this reason he suspended two staff members for using 'excessive force' against boys in two incidents. One was a social worker with 20 years' experience. At this time, the home had 19 staff, including a psychiatrist, a clinical psychologist and a part-time educational psychologist employed by the Education Department. According to Zygadlow, in addition to the three secure locked units ('for difficult boys who needed a short burst of detention'), there was an unlocked 'time out' room, where boys would be put for 15-20 minutes at a time to 'cool off'.

In February 1987, it was reported that boys absconded from Stanmore Road Boys' Home 300 times in the previous year, a number which was generated by 'a small number of difficult boys who absconded repeatedly'. The then-principal, David Hutchinson advised that the home was 'an open institution with few locked doors' and that staff sought to 'understand motivating factors and work with the young person to alleviate those where we are able to.'

== Facilities ==
According to a 1980 Annual Report, Stanmore Road Boys' Home was 'a regional institution which provided " ... remand, observation and classification facilities as well as short term assessment and training as a preliminary to more permanent placement."

Around 1957, it had beds for 25 boys. By 1970 this had increased to 29, with two 'secure beds'. Around 1984 it had 29 beds plus five 'secure beds'.

Archives New Zealand hold records about the following aspects of the home: menu registers from 1936-1941, daily diaries from 1946 - 1974, and duplicate daily diaries from 1947 - 1952. Access to these records is restricted.

Now demolished, the Stanmore Boys' Home site is now home to Stanmore New World supermarket.

== Experiences of residents ==
Several former residents of the home have provided information to the media and to the Royal Commission of Inquiry into Abuse in Care.

One of these was Alan Nixon, who entered Stanmore Road Boys' Home in July 1976 aged 14, after being physically and sexually abused at Marylands School. He was given an 'initiation beating' when he arrived, and was punched in the ribs and verbally abused by a male staff member for misbehaving. After running away, he was placed in a Secure Unit, which was like a jail cell...[with]...cold showers. Alan was moved to Epunui Boys' Home in September 1976, 'because Stanmore Road was struggling to manage so many boys'.

A man known as 'Mr D. A.' also gave evidence to the Royal Commission of Inquiry into Abuse in Care and was interviewed by RNZ. He entered Stanmore Road Boys' Home aged 16, after also being abused at Marylands School. He said that the home was ''just as nasty. It went from a bad situation to a worse situation. Thank goodness there was alcohol around."

A man with the pseudonym 'Kerry Johnson' was placed in residential care at the age of seven. After being sexually and physically abused at Marylands School, then at Campbell Park School in North Otago, he arrived at Stanmore Road Boys' Home in 1987. 'Kerry' spent most of his time there in the 'secure unit, because I was a violent boy, I was attacking every person, even staff. I was attacking them...[b]ecause I didn't want anyone to touch me no more."

In 2020, Jack Horton was interviewed by Sophie Cornish of Stuff about his time at Stanmore Road Boys' Home, one of the several homes he lived in after his mother abandoned him aged three. Punished for running away aged 13, Jack was placed in seclusion in an isolation cell for two to three weeks in a room with a 'concrete bed with a foam squab, a single plastic chair, blankets and a panic button. Carpet was halfway up the walls to “stop the kids hurting themselves”'.

Shayne Tibbotts was placed in Stanmore Road Boys' Home when he was 12, after his mother died. He spoke to Carly Gooch of The Press about his experience in October 2024. He said of his time at the home that 'there were some good people, but there were some bad people. They made you feel like a piece of shit, they made you feel it was your fault you were there.”

A man known as Aaron was placed at Stanmore Road Boys' Home when he was 13, after he stood up to his violent stepfather. He spoke of his experiences to Andrew McRae of RNZ. He recalled it was 'sort of a violent place', where he saw 'drug addicts use needles'.

Stewart Best entered Stanmore Road Boys' Home at the age of eight, after being raised in a violent and abusive way. He spoke to RNZ in 2021, saying that the home 'was terrifying at first, but soon became a very positive experience'. He felt cared for at the home, receiving 'love and respect' from the staff, which set him up well for his role as a social worker at Male Support Services, Awhina Tane Waikato.

Darryl Smith wrote a book called Silent No More (2020) about his time in the care of the state from 1974 until the end of 1978, which included a period in the Stanmore Road Boys' Home as well as Marylands.
