= Maryland School =

Maryland School may refer to:

- Maryland School for the Deaf, Maryland, United States
- Maryland School for the Blind, Maryland, United States
- Maryland's School, Christchurch, New Zealand
