= Inquiries Act 2013 =

Act of Parliament in New Zealand

New Zealand Parliament
- Assented to: 26 August 2013
- Commenced: 27 August 2013
- Administered by: Department of Internal Affairs

Legislative history
- Introduced by: Richard Worth
- First reading: 28 July 2009
- Second reading: 20 August 2013
- Committee of the whole: 21 August 2013
- Third reading: 22 August 2013
- Status: In force

The Inquiries Act 2013 is an Act of the New Zealand Parliament that provides for a framework to conduct Royal Commissions of Inquiry, public, and government inquiries.

== History ==
=== Law Commission's review of public inquiries ===
Before the Inquiries Act 2013 was passed into law, the Commissions of Inquiry Act 1908 governed the operation of commissions and royal commissions of inquiry. Alongside royal commissions, the government would also hold ministerial inquiries.

On 28 August 2006, the New Zealand Law Commission started a review of the way inquiries are held in New Zealand with their terms of reference particularly concerning the Commissions of Inquiry Act, royal commissions and ministerial inquiries. In a draft submission, the Law Commission noted that their primary concerns regarding the existing framework were that the existing Commissions of Inquiry Act was antiquated and amended frequently in one-off situations, its provisions were confusing and that it placed constraints on the procedure of commissions of inquiry that added unnecessary time and cost to inquiries. The Law Commission's Issues Paper identified that commissions of inquiry, on average, would go beyond their deadline by 4 months.

On 26 May 2008, the Law Commission published its final review on public inquiries, recommending that a new Inquiries Act be created to largely replace the Commissions of Inquiry Act. On the same day, the Minister of Internal Affairs Rick Barker responded welcoming the Law Commission's review.

=== Introduction ===
On 29 September 2008, Barker introduced the Inquiries Bill to the New Zealand Parliament, replacing commissions of inquiry with public and government inquiries, and retaining royal commissions of inquiry. However, Barker introduced the bill after the 48th New Zealand Parliament had its final sitting on 23 September 2008, and the parliament was later dissolved on 3 October 2008.

=== First reading ===
On 8 December 2008, the 49th New Zealand Parliament met for the first time under the Fifth National Government, with Richard Worth as the new Minister of Internal Affairs, who took charge of the bill.

On 28 July 2009, the Inquiries Bill unanimously passed its first reading and was referred to the Government Administration select committee for consideration.

=== Second reading ===
On 20 August 2013, the Inquiries Bill passed its second reading with a large margin, but the vote was not unanimous. Notably, the Green Party abstained from the vote, with Green MP Holly Walker expressing concern over the ability of public and government inquiries to compel witnesses to provide documents and other information and how this could undermine the protection of journalist's sources. She further expressed her concern at "serious offenses and penalties" associated with not complying, which can result in a fine of up to $10,000 and contempt of inquiry proceedings could be brought against them in the High Court.

Inquiries Bill – Second Reading (Party vote (Note: This was conducted using a party vote, which allows a party's representative to cast all of its votes in one way. As this was not a personal vote, this table does not record the vote of each individual MP.) on 20 August 2013)
Party	Votes for	Votes against	Abstentions
National (59)	59	—	—
Labour (34)	34	—	—
Green (14)	—	—	13
NZ First (7)	7	—	—
Māori Party (3)	3	—	—
Mana (1)	—	—	1
ACT (1)	1	—	—
United Future (1)	1	—	—
Independent (1)	—	1: Brendan Horan	—
Total	105	1	14

=== Third reading and royal assent ===
On 21 August 2013, the Inquiries Bill passed its third reading unanimously. This came after the Green Party's concerns were addressed in the committee of the whole house stage, as section 68 and 69 of the Evidence Act 2006 applied through clause 28 of the Inquiries Bill. Those sections protect journalists from being compelled to reveal their sources and the communication between MPs and their constituents.

On 26 August 2013, the Inquiries Bill received Royal assent and became law as the Inquiries Act 2013. It came into force on the next day.

=== Present day ===
Since it became law, the Inquiries Act 2013 has been used in a number of high-profile inquiries. Two royal commissions, the Royal Commission of Inquiry into COVID-19 Lessons Learned and Royal Commission of Inquiry into Abuse in Care were both conducted under the new provisions for royal commissions of inquiry under the Act. The Havelock North drinking water contamination was a government inquiry, established as the Government Inquiry into Havelock North Drinking Water.

== Legislative features ==
=== Types of inquiries ===
The Inquiries Act 2013 allow for three different types of inquiries, royal commissions of inquiry, public inquiries, and government inquiries. The differences between these inquiries are primarily between the way they are established and how they report back their findings.

Royal commissions and public inquiries are established by the Governor-General on the advice of ministers and report back to the Governor-General. In contrast, government inquiries are established by a Minister through a notice in the New Zealand Gazette and report back to one or more ministers.

=== Powers and duties of inquiries ===
Inquiries established under the Act have a core requirement, under section 10, to act independently, impartially and fairly when exercising its powers and performing its duties. Furthermore, section 11 prohibits the inquiry from making any form of determination of the liability of a person, whether civil, criminal or disciplinary.

Furthermore, inquiries are given the authority to regulate their own procedure as they see fit, unless the Act or their terms of reference say otherwise. When regulating their procedure, they must ensure they comply with the principles of natural justice and consider the need to avoid unnecessary delay and added cost to public funds, witnesses, and others participating in the inquiry.

One of the primary powers of inquiries, is their ability to summon witnesses and order information. An inquiry may order a person to disclose specific documents, information, and verify by statutory declaration any written information, and copies of documents provided to the inquiry. In addition, they may summon witnesses which must include the location and time they are required to attend, the documents they are required to produce to the inquiry, as well as their entitlements for costs and travel expenses and the penalty for failing to appear.

=== Offences ===
The Act has a number of offences relating to inquiries, all of which, on conviction, carry a fine not exceeding $10,000. There are two main types of offences, which are, offences relating to evidence and witnesses, and offences relating to disruptive and threatening behaviour.

The offences relating to evidence and witnesses are, failing to attend the inquiry per its summons, refusing to be sworn or affirm and give evidence, failing to produce a document required by the inquiry, destroying evidence or obstructing or hindering any authorised person from examining, copying or make a representation of the evidence required by the inquiry, witness tampering, and perjury.

The offences relating to disruptive and threatening behaviour are, disrupting the proceedings of an inquiry, or threatening or intimidating an inquiry, or its members and officers.

Despite these offences, exceptions apply to most of the offences relating to evidence and witnesses such as exceptions for legal privilege, rights such a right to a fair trial, and some exceptions under the Evidence Act 2006, for example, protecting a journalist's sources or the communication between a constituent and their MP.
