= Brothers Hospitallers of Saint John of God =

Roman Catholic religious order

Hospitaller Order of Saint John of God
- Fatebenefratelli
- Abbreviation: OH
- Formation: 1572
- Founder: John of God
- Founded at: Toledo
- Type: Mendicant order of pontifical right
- Legal status: Institute of Consecrated Life
- Members: 1,039 (including 116 priests)
- Motto: Caritas
- General Headquarters: Fatebenefratelli – Curia Generalizia, 138 Via della Nocetta 263; Rome, Italy, 00164
- Prior general: Pascal Ahodegnon
- Affiliations: Catholic Church
- Website: ohsjd.org

The Brothers Hospitallers of Saint John of God, officially the Hospitaller Order of the Brothers of Saint John of God (abbreviated as OH), are a Catholic religious order founded in 1572 in Toledo, Spain. In Italian they are also known commonly as the Fatebenefratelli, meaning "Do-Good Brothers", and elsewhere as the "Brothers of Mercy", the "Merciful Brothers" and the "John of God Brothers". The order carries out a wide range of health and social service activities in 389 centres and services in 46 countries.

== Founder ==
St. John of God, the founder of the order, was born 8 March 1495 at Montemor-o-Novo in Portugal. Twice he enlisted in the Spanish army against the French and later the Turks. After years of living a highly religious way of life in Spain resulting from a conversion experience, in 1535 he founded his first hospital at Granada, where he served the sick and afflicted. After ten years spent in the exercise of charity, he died 8 March 1550 of pneumonia after he had plunged into a river to save a young man from drowning. He was canonized by Pope Alexander VIII in 1690 and was declared the patron saint of the dying and of all hospitals by Pope Leo XIII in 1898.

== History ==
John of God's first companion, Antón Martín, O.H., was chosen to succeed him as prior general of the order. Thanks to the generosity of King Philip II of Spain, a hospital was founded at Madrid, another at Córdoba and several others in various Spanish towns. Pope Pius V approved the Order of the Brothers Hospitallers in 1572 under the Rule of St. Augustine. The order spread rapidly into the other countries of Europe, and even into the distant colonies. For example, the Order provided staff to the Fortress of Louisbourg in New France (now Canada) during the mid 1700s; one of their roles was the operation of the hospital.

In 1584, Pope Gregory XIII called some of the Brothers to Rome and gave them the Hospital of St. John Calybita, Fatebenefratelli Hospital, located on an island in the Tiber, which then became the motherhouse of the whole order. Brother Sebastiano Arias founded the Hospital of Our Lady at Naples and the famous Hospital of Milan. Another Brother Hospitaller at this time was John Grande, O.H., who was beatified by Pope Pius IX in 1852. The first general of Brothers Hospitallers of St. John of God was Pedro Soriano.

=== Expansion ===
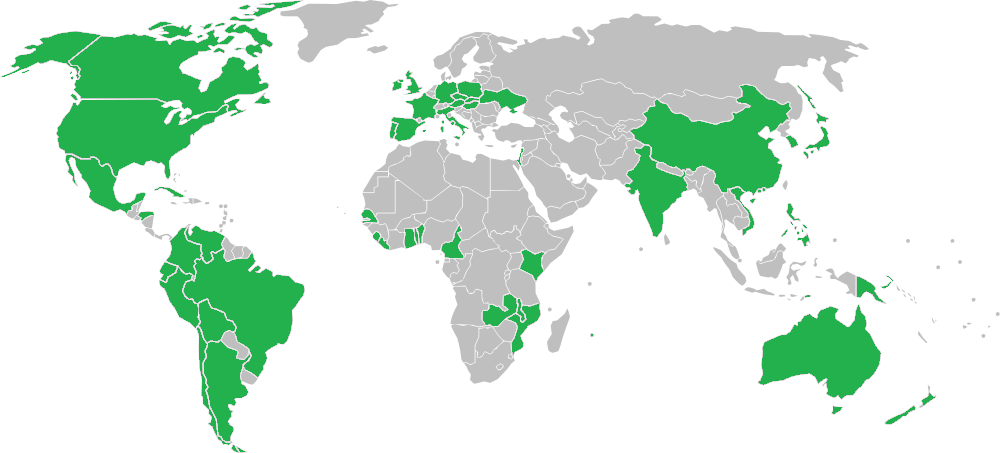
Brothers Hospitallers of St. John of God in the world

The membership of the Order consists of over 1,250 Brothers who come from 50 countries. The coworkers who partner the Brothers in their activities number approximately 40,000. The Order has bases in over 40 countries.

The first hospital of the order in France was founded in Paris, in 1601, by Queen Marie de Medici. In the stormy days of the French Revolution the Brothers were expelled from the forty hospitals where they were caring for 4,125 patients. New large hospitals were subsequently established, after the revolution's end.

The Order was brought to Poland in 1609. The rich Krakowian merchant Valerian Montelupi (of Italian heritage) donated to the brothers a tenement house not far from the main square. In the 1800s they were relocated to Kazimierz, the then-separate city, now district of Kraków, where to this day, they reside in their monastery and church, running their large hospital next door, in Trinitarska street.

In 1880 a house was founded at Scorton, North Yorkshire, England, for the reception of male patients with chronic infirmities, paralysis, or old age, and is supported by charitable contributions. The original foundation developed into a hospital and nursing home. In 1930 the Brothers started a work in Potters Bar caring for people with learning disabilities. In the early days, the St John of God Hospital had its own farm of about five acres of land which supported cows, pigs and poultry, along with a couple of horses. In addition, a hospice of the order has been established at Nazareth.

In 1882, a home for men with dementia syndromes (Note: A home "for the demented" or "demented men", in the terminology of the time; patients may have displayed symptoms of many different forms of neurocognitive syndrome.) was founded at Stillorgan near Dublin, Ireland. Activities in the Irish Republic include a base in Celbridge, County Kildare, Ireland, helping people with disabilities in the area. The Irish postal authority, An Post, recognised and honoured the contribution of the order to society by issuing a special commemorative postage stamp in 1979 for the order's centenary in Ireland.

The Hospitaller Brothers were established in the United States in 1941, where they operate health care facilities in southern California offering a continuum of care including: Independent Living, Assisted Living, Skilled Nursing, Residential Care, Retirement Living and a specialized Alzheimer Unit. A large school and training center was established by Brothers from the Irish Province in New Jersey to meet the needs of the mentally and physically disabled.

In December 1947, Australia's Cardinal Gilroy announced two Brothers from the Order had arrived from Ireland, and a further four Brothers would arrive in January 1948 to establish the St John of God Training Centre for "sub-normal boys" on a 50-acre property near Lake Macquarie (New South Wales). Cardinal Gilroy noted "All six Brothers are certificated mental nurses, each holding RMN (Note: Registered Mental Nurse) and RMPA (Note: A qualification from the Royal Medico-Psychological Association. Founded in 1841 as the Association of Medical Officers of Asylums and Hospitals for the Insane, becoming the Medico-Psychological Association in 1865, and then the Royal Medico-Psychological Association. It became the Royal College of Psychiatrists in 1971.) certificates". The site was later named Kendall Grange.

In 2017, the report of a Royal Commission into Institutional Responses to Child Sexual Abuse established in Australia claimed that over 40% of the Brothers of the Australian Order of St John of God were alleged child sex abusers.

The Order also has many health projects in African countries, such as Malawi, Ghana, Kenya and Sierra Leone. The Brothers operate the Saint-Jean de Dieu Hospital in Tanguiéta, in northern Benin. When first built it had sixty beds. Now it is a reference point for the entire region and has 290 beds, serving people from neighbouring countries such as Burkina Faso, Togo, Nigeria, and Niger.

=== Ebola outbreak ===
The outbreak of the Ebola virus in West Africa in 2014 had a major impact on the medical centers run by the Hospitaller Brothers in that region. As of September, sixteen members of the staff at St. Joseph Hospital in Monrovia, Liberia, and St. John of God Hospital in Lunsar, Sierra Leone, died. Of these, three were members of the Order who served at the hospital in Liberia. The first two to die were Patrick Nshamdze, O.H., a native of Cameroon and the director of the hospital, and George Combey, O.H. A third member, Miguel Parajes, O.H., a priest from Spain, contracted the disease while caring for Nshamdze, who had not tested positive for the disease initially. He was airlifted at his request by the Spanish government for treatment in his native country. He later died, becoming the first victim of the disease to die in Europe.

Also returned to Spain with Parajes was Sister Juliana Bonoha Bohé, M.I.C., a native of the former Spanish colony of Equatorial Guinea, one of a group of Missionary Sisters of the Immaculate Conception who worked with the Brothers at the hospital. Once in Spain, she tested negative for the virus. Spain, however, refused to transport her colleague, Sister Chantal Pascaline Muwamemem, M.I.C., from the Congo, who later also died of the disease.

In September, a fourth Hospitaller Brother, Manuel García Viejo, a native of Spain and the medical director of the Brothers' hospital in Sierra Leone, was nursing Brother Patrick Nshamdze, before he had tested positive for Ebola. He himself later fell ill. Initially he wished to remain but he eventually asked to be repatriated to Spain. He too died several days after his arrival in a hospital in Madrid at the age of 69.

== Order of the Brothers Hospitallers ==
=== Charism ===
The charism of the order is caring for the sick, as a way of living the beatitudes of Christ.

=== Apostolate ===
A particular apostolate of the order is the Special Needs Faith Formation Program, which serves children and adults with special needs in preparing to receive the sacraments within the Roman Catholic Church.

The Brothers undergo a special course of training in order to fit them for carrying out their various works of charity to which they devote their life. In some provinces some of them are even graduates in medicine, surgery and chemistry. The members are not in holy orders, but priests wishing to devote their sacred ministry to the Brothers and patients are received. To the three solemn vows of religion they add a fourth vow of serving the sick for life in their hospitals.

They assist daily at Mass, meditation, the recital in choir of the office of Our Lady and spiritual reading. The order accepts applications from men between the ages of fifteen and thirty-five. The religious habit is usually given to postulants after three months. The time of novitiate is two years, after which the novice pronounces the vows which, although simple, are perpetual. Three years later, he can be admitted to solemn profession.

=== Structure ===
As of 2014, the Brothers are split into 20 provinces: Africa, Andalusia, Aragon, Austria, Bavaria, Castille, Colombia, France, India, Korea, Lombardy–Veneto, Northern South America, Oceania, Poland, Portugal, Rome, Southern South America, United States of America, Vietnam and West Europe. There is one vice-province: Benin–Togo, and two General Delegations: Canada, and Mexico and Central America. There are seven provincial delegations: Brazil (dependent on Portugal), Bohemia–Moravia, Hungary and Slovakia (dependent on Austria), Japan (dependent on Korea), Papua New Guinea (dependent on Oceania) and Philippines (dependent on the Roman Province).

== Saints, Blesseds, and other holy people ==
Saints

- João Duarte Cidade de Deus (8 March 1495 – 8 March 1550), founder of the Order, canonized on 16 October 1690
- Juan Grande Román (6 March 1546 – 3 June 1600), professed religious, canonized on 2 June 1996
- Benedetto Menni (11 March 1841 – 24 April 1914), priest and founder of the Hospitaller Sisters of the Sacred Heart of Jesus, canonized on 21 November 1999
- Riccardo Pampuri (2 August 1897 – 1 May 1930), professed religious, canonized on 1 November 1989

Blesseds

- José Olallo Valdés (12 February 1820 – 7 March 1889), Cuban professed religious, beatified on 29 November 2008
- Braulio María Corres Díaz de Cerio and 70 Companions (died between July 1936 to February 1937), Martyrs of the Spanish Civil War, beatified on 25 October 1992
- Mauricio Iñiguez de Heredia Alzola and 23 Companions (died between August 1936 to September 1937), Martyrs of the Spanish Civil War, beatified on 13 October 2013
- Joseph Eustachius Kugler (15 January 1867 - 10 June 1946), German professed religious, beatified on 4 October 2009

Venerables

- Francisco Rodríguez-Camacho Vivas (3 October 1629 - 23 December 1698), professed religious, declared Venerable on 1 January 1881
- William Gagnon (16 May 1905 - 28 February 1972), American professed religious, declared Venerable on 14 December 2015

Servants of God

- Felipe Orbalaes Abreo (died 26 August 1712), priest and Martyr of the La Florida Missions
- Bonifacio Bonillo Fernández (14 May 1899 - 11 September 1978), professed religious, declared as a Servant of God on 27 October 2022
- Manuel (Bento) Nogueira (8 April 1927 - 26 October 2003), professed religious, declared as a Servant of God on 3 October 2023
- Bernhard (Fortunatus) Thanhäuser (15 October 1922 - 21 November 2005), German professed religious and founder of the Sisters of Charity of Saint John of God, declared as a Servant of God in 2015
- Adrián del Cerro Sánchez (2 July 1923 - 8 August 2015), professed religious, declared as a Servant of God on 25 February 2023

== Sexual abuse scandals ==
In 2013, the Victorian Parliamentary Inquiry (VPI) looked at the order's operations in Victoria, Australia. The current head of the order, Brother Timothy Graham, confirmed to the VPI that sixteen brothers had allegations of sexual abuse made against them and were the subject of two civil actions. The first was relating to the abuse of adults at the Order's Lilydale facility. There were also 20 child-related complaints. In 2014, seven of the brothers accused remained in the order, nine had left, and the remainder were deceased.

Graham told the VPI his order had no scrutiny or accountability mechanisms in place to prevent the abuse of the vulnerable children in their care. Brother Brian O'Donnell, former provincial of the order in Australia said that, "In my experience, no allegations of sexual misconduct against the brothers was ever documented and would be currently held in the archives ... this practice was followed in order to deal with the situation in its actual context without compromising the good name of the (brother) involved." Graham confirmed that despite 40% of the brothers in his order having serious allegations of sexual abuse levelled against them, no checks and balances were in place to vet prospective new members.

The Royal Commission into Institutional Responses to Child Sexual Abuse looked at some case studies pertaining to the order but was unable to fully investigate due to the trials of Bernard McGrath and John Clegg.

In 2020, the second episode of the ABC documentary series Revelation followed the criminal trial of McGrath at the New South Wales District Court. Presenter Sarah Ferguson interviewed McGrath in his maximum security prison, where McGrath revealed that he was part of an institutional cover-up, with former leaders Brother Brian O'Donnell and Brother Joseph Smith aware of his offending. McGrath also told Ferguson that following complaints from his victims, Smith had taken him to meet Father Brian Lucas, the priest responsible of the Australian Catholic Church's response to the child sexual abuse scandal. This meeting took place in 1992 at the presbytery of St Mary's Cathedral, Sydney. Shortly afterwards, Smith accompanied McGrath to a treatment facility in Jemez Springs, New Mexico, United States. During McGrath's stay at Jemez Springs, Smith was formally notified of a police investigation and called McGrath, telling him he should stay in the United States. McGrath decided to return to Australia and was arrested and convicted of sex crimes against Jason Van Dyke.

=== New Zealand ===
The order ran the Marylands School which taught pupils with learning difficulties, in Christchurch, New Zealand. Events there in the 1970s would later lead to a high-profile scandal with sexual offence charges being laid against four members of the order: Brothers Bernard McGrath, Roger Maloney, Raymond Garchow, and William Lebler.

In 2020, it was announced that the Hospitaller Brothers of St John of God would be specifically investigated by the Royal Commission of Inquiry into Abuse in Care and its sub-inquiry into care by the Catholic Church in New Zealand. The Royal Commission undertook to investigate the sexual abuse of children under the care of the Brothers of St John of God in Marylands, their residential school in Christchurch. Public hearings into Marylands School abuse were held by the Commission during 9–17 February 2022. The Commission plans to hold public hearings into two further St John of God, Christchurch institutions: St Joseph's Orphanage and the Hebron Trust.

In early August 2023, the Royal Commission released an interim report, titled "Stolen Lives, Marked Souls" to the Governor-General, which focused on three Christchurch institutions run by the Order: Marylands School, Hebron Trust, and St Joseph's Orphanage. The report documented several cases of depravity, sexual, physical and spiritual abuse at these institutions, with Marylands School and Hebron Trust being described as "hell on earth". Australian convicted sex offender Brother Bernard McGrath, who worked for four years at Marylands School, was identified by the report as a "prolific abuser."

=== Australia ===
The Royal Commission into Institutional Responses to Child Sexual Abuse uncovered that 40% of the members of the order had child abuse allegations against them between 1950 and 2010.

==== New South Wales ====
Kendall Grange, Morisset

Kendall Grange, a residential facility for boys was established in 1947 by the Bishop of Newcastle at Morisset, New South Wales. The bishop invited brothers of the Hospitaller Order of St John of God to teach boys aged predominantly between 8 and 15 who had behavioural, emotional and intellectual problems.

Kendall Grange was run with the assistance of civilian staff. Around 300 boys lived at the school at any one time housed in dormitories and rooms on the school grounds. Boys were grouped together according to their age. House-mothers assisted looking after the boys.

In 2010, New South Wales Police commenced investigating allegations made against brothers and civilian teachers associated with the school. As a result, Brother Bernard McGrath and Brother John Clegg were convicted of multiple counts of sexual offences committed upon students at Kendall Grange.

The following St John of God brothers taught at Kendall Grange:

- Brother Bernard McGrath (1973, 1977–1986) – convicted of child sexual abuse, currently in prison in New South Wales
- Brother John Clegg – convicted of child sexual abuse, currently in prison in New South Wales
- Brother Rodger Maloney – convicted of child sexual abuse, deceased
- Brother Daniel Slattery – convicted of child sexual abuse, currently awaiting sentencing in New South Wales
- Brother Roger Mount – convicted of child sexual abuse, currently in prison in Victoria
- Brother William Lebler – deemed unfit to stand trial, deceased
- Brother Raymond Garchow – deemed unfit to stand trial, deceased
- Brother John 'Bede' Donnellan (1968–1974, 1977) – died before charges laid, allegations substantiated
- Brother Terence John 'Vianney' Welch (1968–1969)
- Brother Kerry 'Justin' Woodford (1968–1969)
- Brother John 'Ferris' Kirkpatrick (1968)
- Brother Terence 'Patrick' Williams (1968)
- Brother John 'Feral' Collins (1969–1973)
- Brother Peter 'Mark' West (1969–1973)
- Brother Terence Noel 'Ignatius' Brennan (1970–1971)
- Brother Robert 'Leo' Arkey (1971)
- Brother Bernard 'Norbet' Quin (1971–1975)
- Brother John 'Stanislaus' Murray (1971–1974)
- Brother Anthony Vincent 'Emmanuel' Leahy (1972–1976)
- Brother John Clifford 'Martin De Porres' Quarmby (1974–1975)
- Brother Thomas 'Raphael' Dillon (1974–1975)
- Brother Stephen Edward Richmond (1977)
- Brother Terence 'Aloyisus' Tehan (1976–1978)
- Brother David Anthony Toohey (1977)
- Brother Edward Collins (1977–1987)
- Brother Michael William Davies (1979)

The other brothers who allegedly committed offences are deceased or were deemed unfit to stand trial.

Bernard McGrath faced his fifth criminal trial in Sydney in 2019. The trial was featured in ABC's documentary series Revelation. Presenter Sarah Ferguson interviewed McGrath in a maximum security prison, where McGrath admitted the Order covered-up his sexual abuse.

==== Victoria ====
Churinga, Cheltenham and Lilydale

In 2012, Wayne Chamley of the advocacy group Broken Rites alleged that a group of 15 religious brothers from the Order of St John of God abused children in their care over three decades, including wards of the state, in homes for the mentally impaired.

The allegations related to the order's institutions at Churinga, Cheltenham, and Lilydale, Victoria, where it provided accommodation and education for orphans, state wards, and boys with intellectual disabilities from the 1950s to the 1980s.

In 2001, members of the order, their lawyers, their insurers, and victims held a meeting in response to legal claims by dozens of former residents of the order's homes. Peter Gordon and barrister John Gordon represented the victims. The allegations included:

- One brother, Daniel Slattery, was the subject of seven or eight abuse allegations starting in 1975 but was never reported to the police. Brother Daniel assaulted one boy, the abuse was covered up and then two years later, Daniel abused the same boy again.
- Complaints were ignored or shifted from institution to institution.
- Parents wrote letters complaining of abuse but were ignored.

The claims led to a Victoria Police investigation and in 2002, the order paid at least $3.6 million to 24 men who alleged they had been abused by the brothers.

Brother Roger Melville Mount

Despite the compensation, a number of the alleged offenders, including Brother Roger 'Gabriel' Mount, were allowed to move to other roles. In late 2012, journalist Rory Callinan tracked down Brother Roger 'Gabriel' Mount to a small community east of Port Moresby, Papua New Guinea, where he was living illegally.

Mount joined the Order of St John of God in 1961 and adopted the religious name Gabriel. During his time in the Order, he worked at Yarra View during 1968–1969 and Churinga until 1974. He was then transferred to Port Moresby and became the superior of the Order's community in Papua New Guinea. Mount was contracted to the government, working with the Office of the Director of Child Welfare in Boroko. He left the Order in 1981 and became a priest.

Mount was accused of abusing children when he was working as Brother Gabriel with the Order of St John of God at Kendall Grange, NSW and at boys homes in Victoria. It was also revealed the Order of St John of God had paid more than $100,000 to his victims.

In early 2014, Father Ben Fleming, a Port Morseby diocesan official, said the church would act to move Mount. Mount ignored their requests to leave his parish and attempted to overdose. Following his discharge, PNG immigration officials deported Mount to Cairns on 15 October 2015.

Victorian Police detectives from Taskforce SANO were granted permission to extradite Mount from Queensland to Victoria. On 16 January 2015, Mount appeared in Melbourne Magistrates' Court via video link from Port Philip prison. Mount was charged with 40 counts of indecent assault, 14 counts of buggery, five counts of gross indecency and three counts of unlawful assault involving seven victims between 1968 and 1974.

On 14 December 2015, a jury found Mount (73) guilty of three charges of indecent assault, three charges of buggery of a person under 14 years old and two charges of buggery in relation to victim SL. Judge Hannan sentenced Mount to seven years and 10 months imprisonment and required him to sign the sex offenders registry.

== Membership statistics ==
Historical population
Year	Pop.	±%
2007	1,269	—
2008	1,232	−2.9%
2009	1,204	−2.3%
2010	1,177	−2.2%
2011	1,146	−2.6%
2012	1,142	−0.3%
2013	1,124	−1.6%
2014	1,099	−2.2%

In the following table, 'SP' will stand for 'solemnly professed', which refers to members having taken permanent vows. 'TP' will stand for 'temporary professed', which refers to members having taken temporary vows. 'N' will stand for 'novices,' which refers to members who have recently joined the order and are not under vows. Oblates, or laypersons affiliated with the order and its way of life but not living under professed vows, are not included in the table.

Province	Brothers	2008	2009	2010	2011	2012	2013	2014
Africa	SP	75	75	53	n/a	48	53	52
Africa	TP	33	37	18	n/a	22	19	19
Africa	N	13	8	5	n/a	9	11	4
Andalusia	SP	88	87	84	n/a	79	73	69
Andalusia	TP	1	–	–	n/a	1	–	–
Andalusia	N	–	–	–	n/a	–	–	–
Aragon	SP	95	92	89	n/a	79	78	77
Aragon	TP	2	–	–	n/a	1	2	2
Aragon	N	1	1	1	n/a	1	–	–
Austria	SP	26	32	32	n/a	37	36	37
Austria	TP	12	13	12	n/a	5	4	3
Austria	N	3	1	3	n/a	1	2	1
Bavaria	SP	38	37	36	n/a	25	25	25
Bavaria	TP	3	4	3	n/a	2	1	1
Bavaria	N	1	–	–	n/a	1	1	–
Benin–Togo	SP	created 2010		20	n/a	23	26	27
Benin–Togo	TP	created 2010		17	n/a	18	18	21
Benin–Togo	N	created 2010		4	n/a	9	5	1
Bohemia–Moravia	SP	6	merged into Austrian Province					
Bohemia–Moravia	TP	–	merged into Austrian Province					
Bohemia–Moravia	N	–	merged into Austrian Province					
Canada	SP	9	9	9	9	9	9	9
Canada	TP	–	–	–	–	–	–	–
Canada	N	–	–	–	–	–	–	–
Castile	SP	108	101	102	n/a	98	97	96
Castile	TP	1	1	1	n/a	–	–	–
Castile	N	–	–	–	n/a	–	–	1
Colombia	SP	32	31	29	n/a	28	27	28
Colombia	TP	4	5	3	n/a	2	4	3
Colombia	N	2	1	1	n/a	2	3	3
England	SP	12	12	merged into West European Province				
England	TP	1	1	merged into West European Province				
England	N	–	–	merged into West European Province				
French	SP	37	34	33	n/a	29	28	28
French	TP	–	–	–	n/a	2	2	5
French	N	–	–	2	n/a	4	6	2
India	SP	34	34	34	n/a	35	37	37
India	TP	10	12	11	n/a	8	4	7
India	N	5	2	4	n/a	6	4	6
Ireland	SP	28	26	merged into West European Province				
Ireland	TP	–	2	merged into West European Province				
Ireland	N	5	4	merged into West European Province				
Korea	SP	20	20	21	n/a	27	30	30
Korea	TP	5	6	5	n/a	5	2	2
Korea	N	1	–	–	n/a	2	1	1
Lombardy–Veneto	SP	50	49	48	n/a	46	46	43
Lombardy–Veneto	TP	1	1	1	n/a	–	–	–
Lombardy–Veneto	N	–	–	–	n/a	–	–	–
Mexico & Central America	SP	27	27	25	n/a	26	26	24
Mexico & Central America	TP	3	4	4	n/a	1	1	1
Mexico & Central America	N	2	–	–	n/a	1	–	–
Northern South America	SP	29	32	32	n/a	29	27	25
Northern South America	TP	9	5	3	n/a	1	1	1
Northern South America	N	3	3	3	n/a	–	1	1
Oceania	SP	41	40	38	n/a	36	31	31
Oceania	TP	9	13	12	n/a	8	8	8
Oceania	N	3	–	–	n/a	3	2	–
Poland	SP	61	60	73	n/a	73	70	70
Poland	TP	12	12	8	n/a	11	8	8
Poland	N	4	2	10	n/a	2	3	4
Portugal	SP	60	59	56	n/a	49	48	45
Portugal	TP	5	3	1	n/a	4	7	7
Portugal	N	1	2	4	n/a	4	2	6
Roman	SP	29	29	28	n/a	27	28	26
Roman	TP	3	3	5	n/a	5	5	5
Roman	N	3	2	1	n/a	1	–	–
Silesian	SP	7	7	merged into Poland Province				
Silesian	TP	5	5	merged into Poland Province				
Silesian	N	1	3	merged into Poland Province				
Southern South America	SP	33	32	33	n/a	33	37	34
Southern South America	TP	8	7	4	n/a	3	4	3
Southern South America	N	2	1	1	n/a	2	2	1
United States of America	SP	21	19	19	19	19	18	17
United States of America	TP	–	–	–	–	–	–	–
United States of America	N	–	–	–	–	–	–	–
Vietnam	SP	55	60	59	n/a	63	61	62
Vietnam	TP	20	15	18	n/a	17	20	16
Vietnam	N	3	10	5	n/a	8	12	13
West European	SP	created 2010		37	n/a	36	35	33
West European	TP	created 2010		4	n/a	5	7	8
West European	N	created 2010		3	n/a	3	1	–

== See also ==
- Vatican Pharmacy
- 2014 Ebola virus epidemic in Liberia
- Revelation TV Series
- Hôpital de la Charité
