= Vatican Pharmacy =

Pharmacy in the Vatican City

Coordinates: 41°54′17.24″N 012°27′22.3″E

- Coat of arms of Vatican City

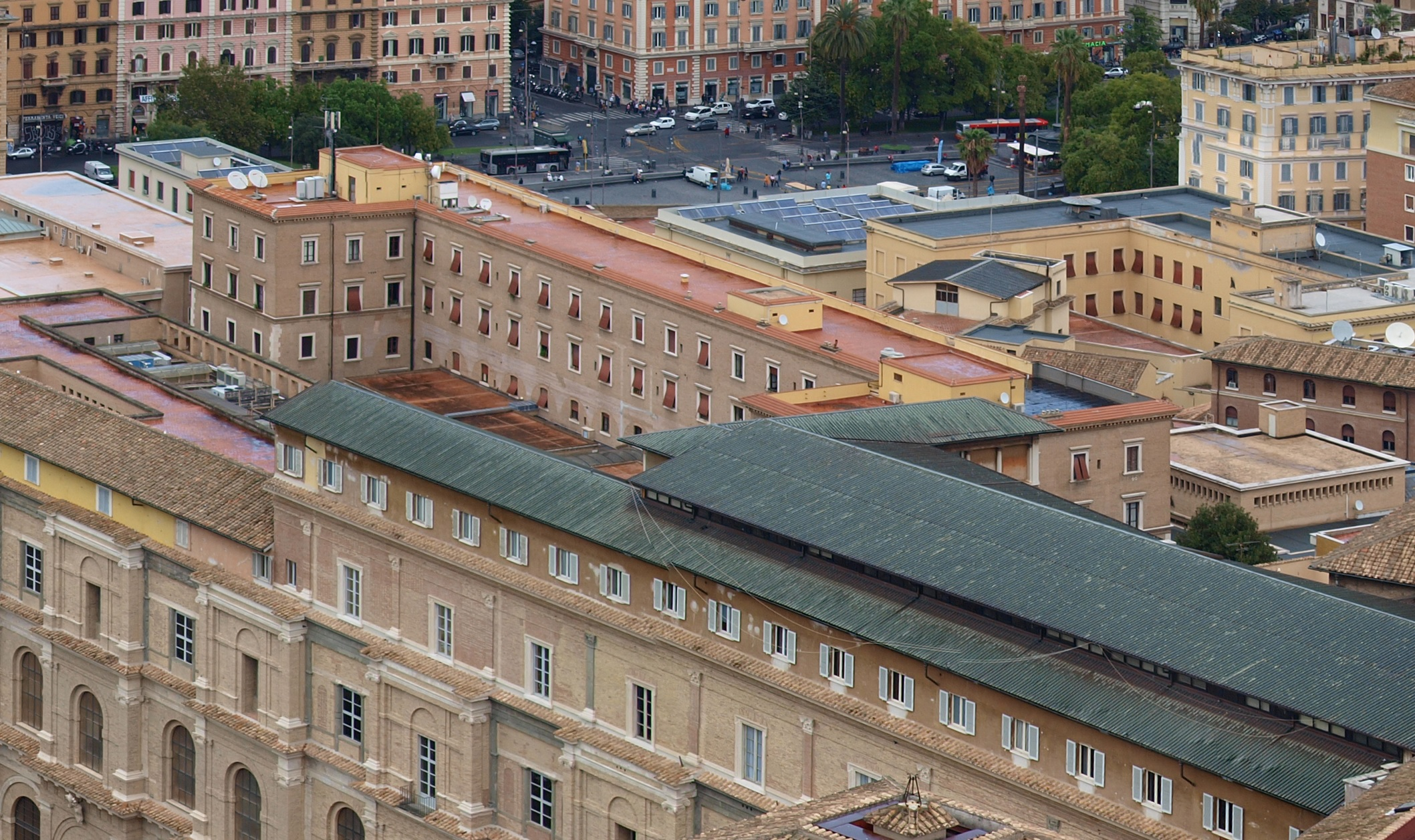
- Vatican Pharmacy building (background)
- Native name: Farmacia Vaticana "Paolo VI" (Italian)
- Industry: Pharmacy
- Founded: 1874; 152 years ago
- Founder: Eusebio Ludvig Fronmen
- Headquarters: Belvedere Palace; Vatican City
- Products: Pharmaceuticals; Personal care items
- Number of employees: 69
- Website: farmaciavaticana.va

Location on a map of Vatican City

The Vatican Pharmacy (Latin and Italian: Farmacia Vaticana) is the only pharmacy in the Vatican City. It was founded in 1874 by Eusebio Ludvig Fronmen, a Fatebenefratelli monk. According to Vatican sources, it is the busiest pharmacy in the world, with 2,000 customers per day. Half of those customers come from outside the Vatican for medicines that are not available in Italy or are difficult to find.

The current director of the pharmacy is Binish Thomas Mulackal, a Fatebenefratelli monk. Although the director of the pharmacy has always been a monk of that order, the staff pharmacists have been lay people for the past 30 years (7 religious and 53 laypeople in 2014). The pharmacy is organized under the Directorate of Health Services, one of eight Vatican City directorates.

Due to a lack of regulations, the Vatican Pharmacy has one of the largest and most extensive stocks in Europe, carrying many American medicines considered experimental in Europe and vice versa. The pharmacy does not stock sexual health-related products nor Chinese traditional medicine. It is popular among the citizens of Rome as it has more stock and prices up to 25% cheaper due to lack of taxes.

== History ==
The pharmacy was founded in 1874, at the height of the "Roman Question", when Cardinal Secretary of State Giacomo Antonelli asked Eusebio Ludvig Fronmen, a Fatebenefratelli monk, who ran a nearby pharmacy, to take charge of supplying medicines for the pope and cardinals residing in the Vatican. Popes had been confined to the Vatican since an 1870 dispute with the Italian government, when Rome was annexed into the Kingdom of Italy.

The pharmacy remained only a storeroom until 1892, when a permanent office was established to offer healthcare services to the pope, cardinals, and bishops of the Vatican. In 1917, the pharmacy was moved to St. Anne's Gate, closer to the main entrance of the Vatican. At the time, the Vatican pharmacy was immensely popular for offering medicines which were otherwise unobtainable within Rome. Even today, due to the complicated bureaucratic drug approval process of the Italian government, the pharmacy often has medicines months to years before Italian pharmacies.

After the Lateran treaties of 1929, the pharmacy was moved to its current location in Palazzo Belvedere, behind the Vatican central post office and across from the Vatican supermarket. Unlike Italian pharmacies, the Vatican Pharmacy will fill foreign prescriptions.

== Eligibility ==
Non-Vatican employees must obtain a temporary pass from a special registry office, and have a prescription and ID to use the pharmacy. The 10,000 members of the Vatican's private health care plan possess a permanent pass to use the pharmacy.

As Vatican City has no taxes, the pharmacy is duty-free.

== Stock ==
The pharmacy carries 42,000 products, but it does not carry products which are contrary to Catholic social teaching, such as contraceptives or abortifacients. Nor does the pharmacy carry sildenafil (Viagra) or medical marijuana. However, the pharmacy does carry "top-brand beauty-care products" and perfume. Its prices for many items are between 12 and 25 percent lower than the prices of the same products in nearby Italian drug stores. The pharmacy also produces some of the ointments and potions it sells.

== See also ==
- Index of Vatican City-related articles
