= Lake Alice (Manawatū-Whanganui) =

Lake in New Zealand

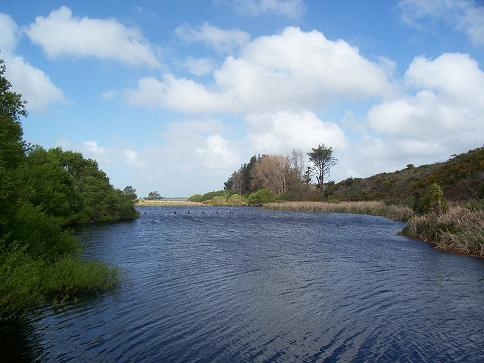

- Location within New Zealand
- Interactive map of Lake Alice
- Location: Lake Alice, Manawatū-Whanganui, North Island
- Coordinates: 40.1346°S 175.3319°E
- Basin countries: New Zealand
- Surface area: 11 hectares (27 acres)

Lake Alice is a small lake approximately 7 kilometres (4 mi) south west of Marton in the Manawatū-Whanganui region of the North Island. The nearby Lake Alice Hospital that closed in 1999 is named after the lake.

== See also ==
- Lake Alice Hospital
