= Juan Grande Román =

Spanish Roman Catholic professed religious

Saint Juan Grande Román O.H.
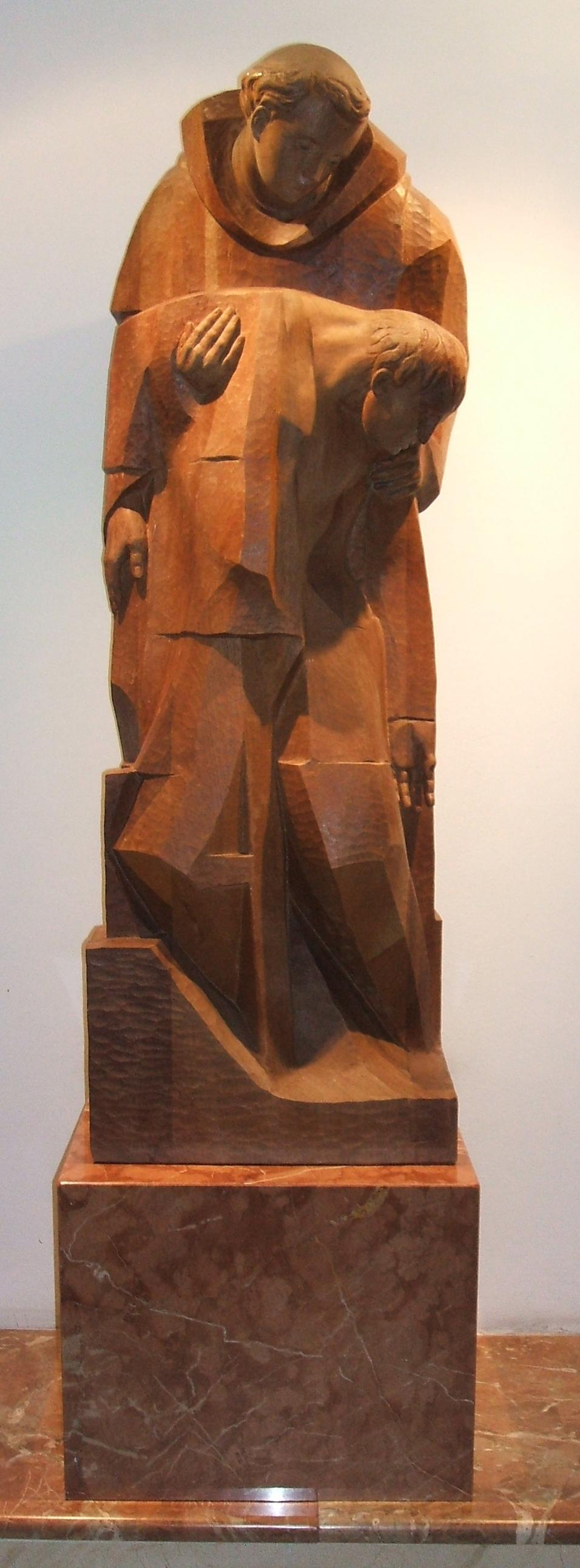

Professed religious
- Born: 6 March 1546; Carmona, Spain
- Died: 3 June 1600 (aged 54); Jerez de la Frontera, Spain
- Venerated in: Roman Catholic Church
- Beatified: 13 November 1858, Saint Peter's Basilica, Papal States by Pope Pius IX
- Canonized: 2 June 1996, Saint Peter's Basilica, Vatican City by Pope John Paul II
- Feast: 3 June
- Patronage: Diocese of Jerez de la Frontera

Juan Grande Román, OH (6 March 1546 – 3 June 1600) was a Spanish Catholic member of the Brothers Hospitallers of Saint John of God. He adopted the name of "John the Sinner" and died of the plague after tending to victims in 1600.

He was beatified in 1858 after Pope Pius IX recognized two miracles attributed to his intercession. A third allowed Pope John Paul II to canonize him in 1996.

== Life ==
Juan Grande Román was born in Spain on 6 March 1546 as the son of Cristobal Grande and Isabel Roman. Andrés Muñoz baptized him after his birth. His father died when he was eleven.

Román served in the church choir at the age of seven to twelve as part of his Catholic education and completed his studies in Seville where he learned the trade of a weaver and cloth-maker. He returned home at the age of seventeen but his work causes a profound spiritual crisis.

He left his home and went to the Hermitage of St. Olalla at Marchena where he spent time in an effort to discern his vocation. He decided to devote himself to God and exchanged his clothes for a sack-cloth habit. He renounced marriage and adopted the nickname of "Juan Pecador" ("John the Sinner"). He - at this time - cared for an old couple and catered to their needs. He would beg for alms for them and realized at that stage his vocation was to devote himself to the needs of the poor.

Román moved to Cádiz at the age of nineteen where he looked after the poor and the sick but also catered to prisoners. He begged for alms around the town in order to help them. He frequented the church of the Franciscan Order to take spiritual advice from one of the friars.

An epidemic broke out in Jerez at the start of 1574 and he attempted to help all those who fell victim to illness. He founded a hospital of his own and devoted it to the Blessed Virgin Mary with the name of "Our Lady of Candlemas".

He soon learned of an institution established under John of God in Granada. In 1574 he visited it and he joined it. He accepted the rules of the institution and applied that to his own hospital. He attracted people and trained them according to "The Statutes of John of God".

The Cardinal Archbishop of Seville Rodrigo de Castro entrusted to him the mission of reducing the number of hospitals. He reduced the number of them despite the great difficulties he encountered in doing so.

Román devoted himself to the victims of a plague that struck Jerez. He devoted all his strength to them but contracted the plague himself. He died of it on 3 June 1600.

== Sainthood ==
The sainthood process commenced in Seville on 4 October 1667 under Pope Clement IX which conferred upon him the title of Servant of God. Pope Pius VI recognized that he had lived a life of heroic virtue and proclaimed him to be venerable on 3 May 1775.

Pope Pius IX presided over his beatification on 1 October 1852 after two miracles were attributed to his intercession. The cause for his canonization was formally opened on 10 December 1930.

The third miracle attributed to him was investigated in Kraków and it was Pope John Paul II who approved it in 1995. He canonized him on 2 June 1996.
