= Alice Lake (disambiguation) =

Alice Lake (1895–1967) was an American film actress.

Alice Lake may also refer to:

- Alice Lake, a lake in Blue Earth County, Minnesota, U.S.
- Alice Lake, a lake in William O'Brien State Park, Washington County, Minnesota, U.S.
- Alice Lake Provincial Park, British Columbia, Canada
- Alice Lake (Sawtooth Wilderness), a lake in Blaine County, Idaho, U.S.

== See also ==
- Lake Alice (disambiguation)
