= Joseph Kugler =

German friar (1867-1946)

Blessed Joseph Kugler OH
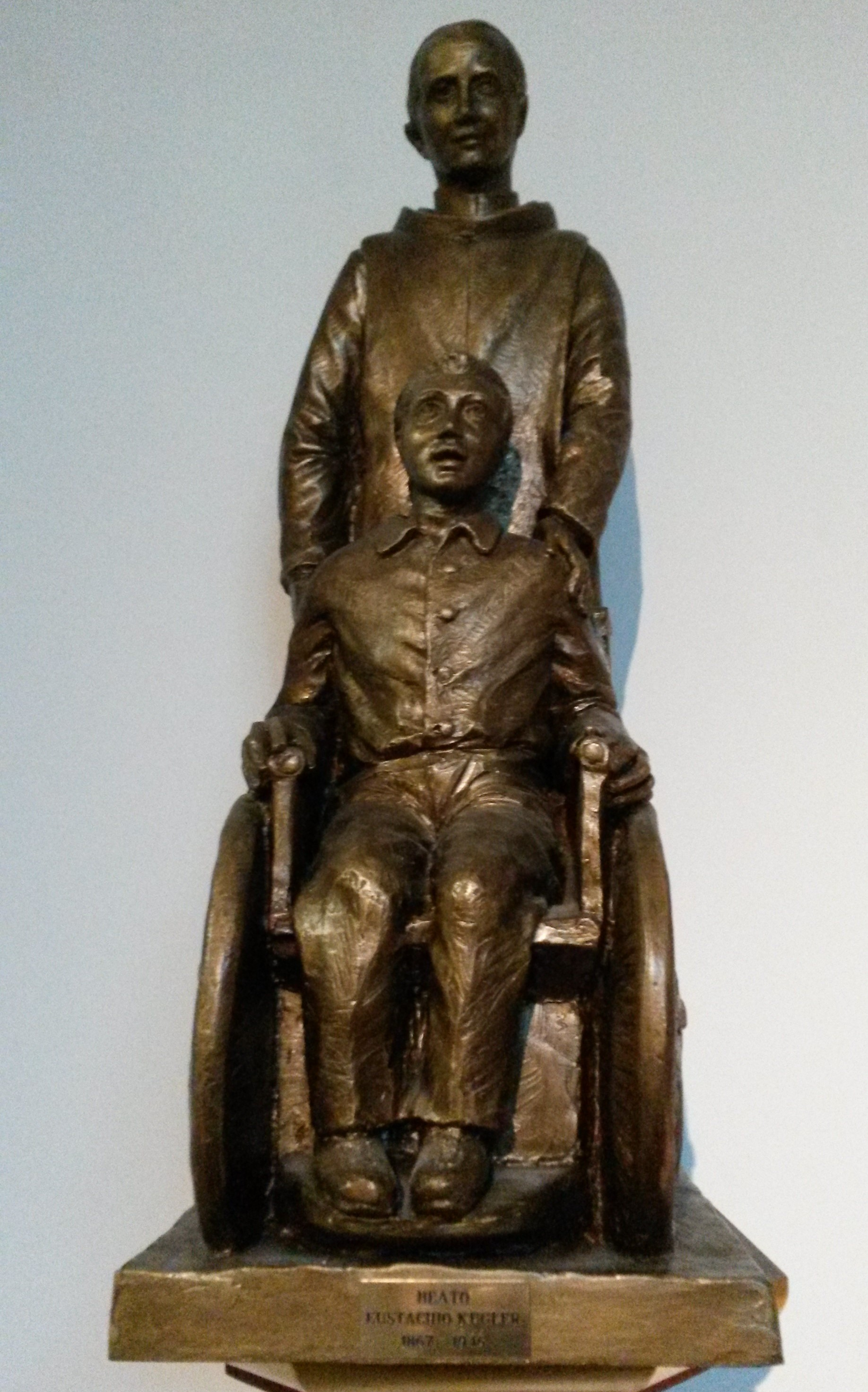

Religious
- Born: 15 January 1867; Neuhaus bei Nittenau, Oberpfalz, Kingdom of Bavaria
- Died: 10 June 1946 (aged 79); Regensburg, Oberpfalz, Germany
- Venerated in: Roman Catholic Church
- Beatified: 4 October 2009, Regensburg Cathedral, Germany by Archbishop Angelo Amato
- Feast: 10 June

Joseph Kugler, OH (15 January 1867 – 10 June 1946) was a German Roman Catholic professed religious of the Brothers Hospitallers of Saint John of God. Kugler entered the congregation in 1893 and assumed his religious name Eustachius upon admittance into the novitiate.

Kugler came into direct contact with the Gestapo during World War II and came to their attention due to being an outspoken critic of Adolf Hitler and the Nazi regime. He also opposed their approval of euthanasia of the ill and old and their anti-Christian policies.

The rite of beatification for the late religious was celebrated in the Regensburg Cathedral on 4 October 2009 with Archbishop Angelo Amato presiding over the beatification on the behalf of Pope Benedict XVI.

== Life ==
Joseph Kugler was born on 15 January 1867 in the Kingdom of Bavaria as the son of a blacksmith. He had at least one sister and one brother. His father died in 1874 and his mother died sometime in the 1880s.

In 1880 he began to work as an apprentice locksmith. However he became injured in an accident and was forced to stop working following an accident where he fell from a scaffold and injured his leg - the issues with his leg transcended to his foot and remained with him throughout his life resulting in a slight limp. In 1884 he returned home and moved in with his sister who was married to a blacksmith and he later began working once again but this time with his brother.

Kugler joined the Brothers Hospitallers of Saint John of God - on 11 January 1893 - but faced initial resistance in entering due to the injuries he had sustained in the past which were believed would impede his admission. The provincial later relented and allowed for Kugler to commence his time in the novitiate; Kugler assumed the religious name of "Eustachius" in 1893. He made his profession in 1898.

He made a particular focal point of his life as a religious to aid handicapped and disabled people and his appointment as the provincial of the Bavarian section of the congregation - from 1905 until 1925 - allowed him to care for more people since he managed fifteen hospitals the order managed. He even constructed a hospital - from 1927 until 1930 - that the order ran as part of his pastoral mission.

During World War II he opposed Adolf Hitler and the Nazi regime and was quite vocal in his criticism and denunciation of the latter's policies regarding euthanasia of both the old and the sick. This bought him into unwanted contact with the Gestapo who interrogated Kugler several times due to this opposition.

Kugler died in Regensburg due to cancer on 10 June 1946.

== Beatification ==
The beatification process opened in Regensburg in an informative process that commenced on 1 March 1963 and concluded its business on 14 May 1965. On 1 March 1963 he was declared a Servant of God under Pope John XXIII after his cause received official approval from the Congregation of Rites. Theologians also took charge of his writings and on 1 April 1969 declared them to be of orthodox nature. A second process was opened on 4 March 1982 and concluded on 12 June 1984. The Congregation for the Causes of Saints validated the process in Rome on 10 April 1992.

The C.C.S. received the Positio dossier in 1992 and theologians approved the cause on 8 June 2004 while the C.C.S. themselves approved the cause on 1 February 2005. Pope Benedict XVI proclaimed him to be Venerable on 19 December 2005 after recognizing his heroic virtue.

The process for investigating a miracle needed for his beatification spanned from 22 January 2004 until its closure on 23 July 2004. The C.C.S. validated it on 13 May 2005 while a medical board voiced approval to the miracle on 14 June 2007. Theologians approved it on 30 October 2007 and the C.C.S. did so as well on 2 December 2008 before taking it to the pope for his approval. The pontiff approved the miracle on 19 January 2009.

The beatification was celebrated in the Regensburg Cathedral on 4 October 2009. Benedict XVI delegated Archbishop Angelo Amato to preside over the celebration on his behalf. The postulator for the cause is Elia Tripaldi.
