= Bernard McGrath =

New Zealand child sexual abuser

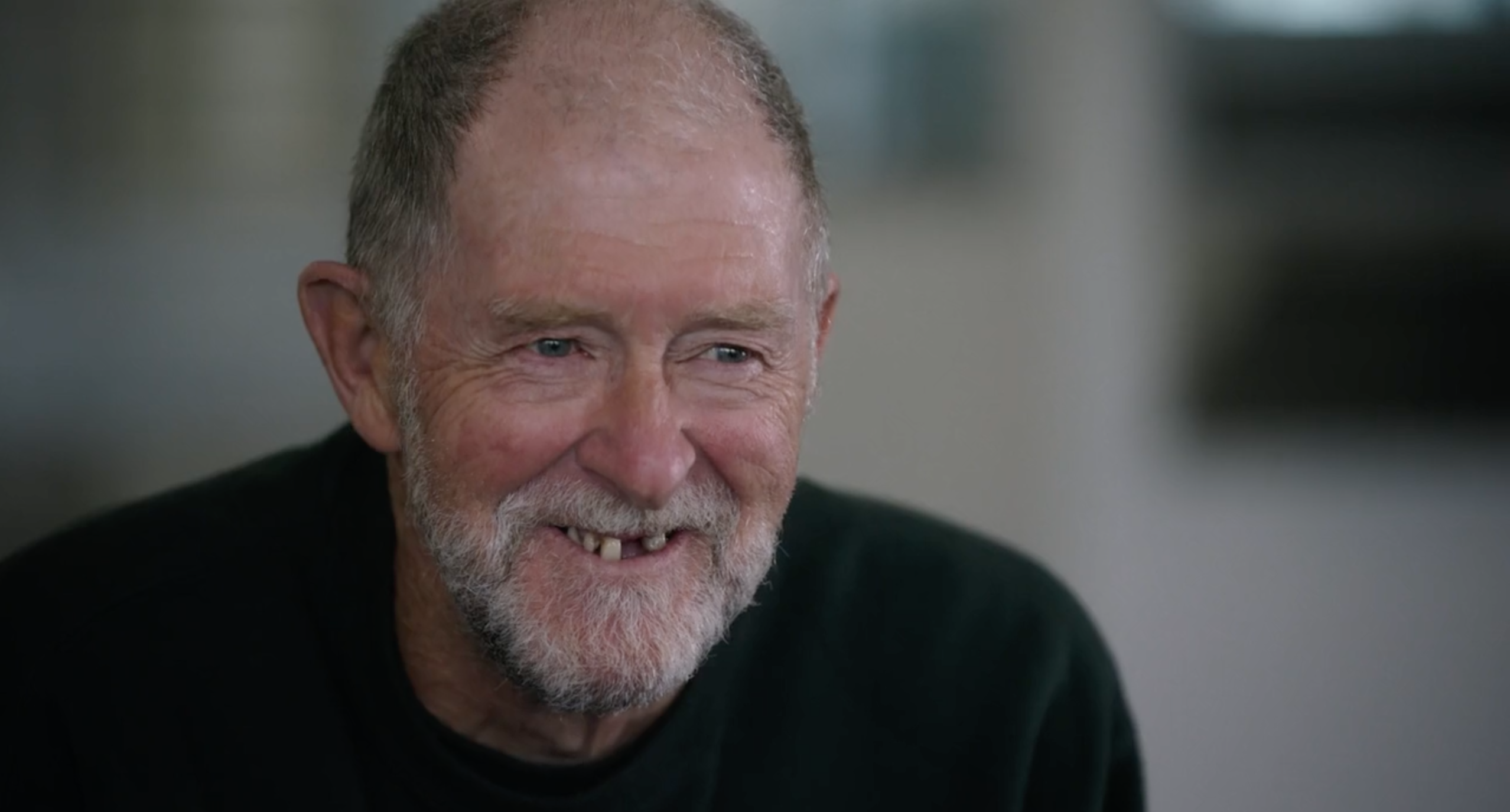
- Born: Bernard Kevin McGrath; 22 May 1947 (age 79); Christchurch, New Zealand
- Occupation: Catholic religious brother
- Known for: Child sexual abuse
- Status: In prison
- Penalty: 1993: 3 years custody; 1997: 9 months custody; 2006: 5 years custody; 2018: 33 years custody; 2019: 29 years custody

Bernard Kevin McGrath (born 22 May 1947) is a New Zealand convicted child sex abuser and former member of the Catholic religious order the Brothers Hospitallers of St John of God. He is considered to be the most notorious offender in the most notorious religious order in Australia. His victims include orphans, children with intellectual and physical disabilities and homeless children in Australia and New Zealand.

McGrath has been convicted of child sexual abuse on five occasions in Australia and New Zealand and is currently being held at the South Coast Correctional Centre, Nowra, New South Wales.

== Early life and career ==
Bernard McGrath was born in Christchurch, New Zealand. He grew up with his parents, one brother and one sister. McGrath's father was a butcher but previously worked as a cleric and was determined his son would follow a life of service to the church. McGrath studied at Xavier College, Christchurch, and despite wanting to study veterinary science, six months after leaving school he joined the Brothers Hospitallers of St John of God when he was 18 years old.

In 1967, he spent six months as a postulate studying and working at Kendall Grange, Morisset, New South Wales.

In early 1968, McGrath took his vows of poverty, obedience, chastity and hospitality. He remained at Kendall Grange until 1969. In early 1969, he moved to Burwood and became a scholastic, working in psychiatric wards. Despite a desire to become a nurse, he enrolled at a teachers' college at Oak Hill and was awarded a Diploma of Teaching. During this time, he reported that he was involved in a sexual relationship with Brother Berchmans Moynahan.

In 1972, McGrath was transferred to the order's school in Churinga, Victoria, and placed in charge of a classroom program. In 1973, he was transferred back to Kendall Grange, where he worked as a teacher for one year.

=== Maryland's School, Christchurch, New Zealand ===
In 1974, McGrath completed his training and was transferred to Marylands School, Christchurch for children with learning and behavioural difficulties. McGrath worked as a dormitory master and teacher and would later allege a culture of violence, fear, sexual abuse and concealment. The prior at the school was Brother Roger Moloney, who would also later be convicted of child sexual abuse.

McGrath told police that Moloney had threatened McGrath's progress in the order unless he acceded to sexual demands made of him. Sexual contact occurred between McGrath and Moloney.

In April 1977, Brother Brian O'Donnell approved Brother Moloney's nomination of Brother McGrath as sub-Prior of the Christchurch community.

In mid-1977, the provincial of the order, Brother Brain O'Donnell, received two written complaints about McGrath and Moloney offending against children. O'Donnell told police he considered the letters were "a malicious attempt to have the two brothers removed." O'Donnell said he destroyed the letters "because of the harm they could do."

On 3 September 1977, despite knowledge of this offending, O'Donnell transferred McGrath to Australia and later to Kendall Grange, another school for disadvantaged children.

Ten days later, Moloney was transferred to Rome, where he worked for a year as a pharmacist in the Vatican. O'Donnell travelled to Christchurch in October 1977 but made no attempt to investigate the allegations. O'Donnell wrote to Moloney and told him "after careful enquires into the allegations made...I am convinced they were completely unfounded."

Also in 1977, Brother Timothy Boxall received a phone call from a sister who worked at the nearby hospital saying McGrath was sexually abusing boys. Boxall alleges he passed on the allegation to Brother Brian O'Donnell.

=== Kendall Grange, New South Wales, Australia ===
In 1981 McGrath became headmaster of Kendall Grange, a boarding school for boys aged between 8 and 15 who suffered from behavioural, emotional or intellectual problems. The brothers of the order ran the school with the assistance of lay staff.

Around 300 boys lived at the school, housed in dormitories. Between four and ten brothers resided at Kendall Grange at any one time and a brother was allocated to a dormitory or section and was directly responsible for the care and welfare of the boys under his supervision.

McGrath was in charge of red section and assumed the role of prior principal. He held this role between 1980 and 1986, which was the period that saw the majority of his offending. McGrath sexually abused scores of children at Kendall Grange, including Jason Van Dyke.

=== Hebron Trust, Christchurch, New Zealand ===
Despite knowledge of his sexual abuse of children at Marylands and Kendall Grange, in 1986, McGrath left Kendall Grange to establish Hebron Trust, a residential program in Christchurch for troubled teenagers and young adults. As the sole brother responsible for the operations of Hebron Trust, McGrath had direct contact with the District Police Commander's Office and Youth Aid.

In 1991, two social workers complained to the order's leadership that McGrath was making sexual advances towards four children in their care. When they received no response, they reported their suspicions to Christchurch police.

28 victims, most under 18 years old, reported to the Order that they had been abused by McGrath during their time at Hebron Trust.

=== Complaints ===
In 1992, Jason Van Dyke's mother, Janice, personally reported her son's sexual abuse by McGrath to Brother Joseph Smith. Smith admitted he had received another complaint about McGrath six months earlier but assured Janice "Don't worry, we are dealing with it."

In October 1993, former Marylands student Brian Uttinger reported that Brother Rodger Moloney had sexually abused him.

In December 1993, the mother of a boy who attended Marylands in the 1970s had written to Cardinal Thomas Williams, Archbishop of Wellington, saying that her son had been sexually assaulted throughout the entire two years he had been at the school.

Cardinal Williams passed this information on to the Bishop of Christchurch, Bishop Meeking, who asked Brother Joseph Smith to "write to the person concerned indicating you have received it from the Cardinal and that the matter is being dealt with."

In December 1999, another victim disclosed that Brother McGrath and Brother Moloney had sexually abused him at Marylands.

In December 2001, a survivor told Christchurch priest Father Paddy Cahill he had been sexually abused. Cahill met with Brother Burke to discuss the allegation.

== Father Brian Lucas ==
On 12 August 1992, Brother Joseph Smith advised Father Brian Lucas of the allegation against McGrath. Lucas advised Smith to tell McGrath that "Allegations have been made, you do not need to give me any details, there is an official protocol that is fair and just for everyone concerned...dangerous for B to return to NZ."

Smith dispatched Brother Julian to bring McGrath back to Sydney. Smith immediately placed McGrath in Burwood Psychiatric Hospital.

On 15 August, Smith brought McGrath to St Mary's Cathedral, Sydney, where they met with Lucas. At this time, Lucas led the Australian Catholic church's response to the emerging scandal of child sexual abuse by priests.

Smith's notes from the meeting say "B told his story and had confession with Fr. David. Brian Lucas suggested I go to lawyer by myself and retell story. B not up to it and requires treatment immediately."

As a civil lawyer, Lucas established the church's Special Issues Resources Group responsible for dealing with allegations of child sexual abuse against clergy. Lucas gave evidence to the Royal Commission that his role was to help the bishop or major superior "manage the person making the complaint, see that their needs were met and get the offender out of the business".

Over the course of his career, Lucas met and interviewed over 30 abusive priests and religious, including Father Denis McAlinden, Father John Farrell, Father John Nestor and McGrath. Lucas took no notes of these meetings, despite the priests confessing to sexually abusing children in their care. He reported none of the offending to the police.

During the meeting at St Mary's Cathedral, McGrath confessed to Lucas that he had sexually abused children and there would be many more complaints. Despite this admission, neither Lucas or Smith reported McGrath to police. In 2019, Lucas acknowledged the meeting took place but said he was not obliged to report McGrath to the police. Lucas denied his failure to report the child sexual abuse to the police was a cover-up.

== Jemez Springs ==
Shortly after the Lucas meeting, Brother Joseph Smith accompanied McGrath to Jemez Springs, a treatment centre run by the Catholic order the Congregation of the Servants of the Paraclete for sexually abusive clergy and religious in New Mexico, United States. At least one other Australian Catholic priest was sent to Jemez Springs, the Ballarat offender Father Gerald Ridsdale.

During 1993–94, McGrath took part in the Jamaica program, a six-month residential treatment for religious personnel who had committed sexual offences against children. During this course, McGrath was required to identify all the children he had sexually abused. None of this information was ever reported to police. McGrath was treated by Sarah Brennan, who stated McGrath surpassed all other clients in the program.

After leaving the program, McGrath moved to Chicago and stayed with other members of his order. During this time, McGrath was notified by Smith that police wanted to question him over multiple allegations of child sexual abuse. Smith offered McGrath the chance to remain in the United States, but in late 1993 he returned to New Zealand to be interviewed about his alleged abuse of two boys at Marylands and four altar boys associated with the life skills course at Hebron Trust.

=== Convictions and imprisonment ===
On 23 December 1993, McGrath pled guilty and was sentenced in the High Court of New Zealand to three years' imprisonment. While serving this sentence, he admitted offences upon three more students from Marylands. He also participated in the Kia Marama Sexual Offenders Program in Rolleston Prison.

In 1995, he was granted parole and started his own cleaning business. He also commenced a psychology program through North Carolina University.

During 1995, Jason Van Dyke made a statement to Chatswood police alleging that McGrath had sexually abused him at Kendall Grange between 1982 and 1983. McGrath was extradited to Australia and on 30 January 1997 pleaded guilty to all six charges relating to Van Dyke. McGrath was sentenced to nine months' imprisonment. In October 1997, McGrath was released from jail and returned to New Zealand and was discharged from the St John of God order.

Following publicity around McGrath's conviction, more allegations emerged and in 2003 and McGrath was again arrested by Christchurch police. He agreed to a six-hour interview with Detective Sean Buckley. The arrest resulted in a number of charges and an indictment containing 54 counts of sexual abuse upon multiple complainants.

During that time, five other members of the order, Brother Roger Moloney, Brother Raymond Garchow, Brother William Lebler and Brother Rodger Mount all faced child sexual abuse allegations.

In 2006, McGrath was found guilty on 21 charges of child sexual abuse against nine victims aged between 7 and 15 years old. He was sentenced to five years' imprisonment. In 2008, as McGrath was released on parole, Brother Roger Moloney was sentenced to two years and nine months on seven counts of sexual abuse of children at Marylands.

Following the devastating Christchurch earthquake, McGrath moved to Ashburton and took on the role of care-taker for a 20-acre farm. He then set up a tea business and travelled to Sri Lanka.

In late 2010, Strike Force Lozano was established by NSW Police to investigate more allegations of child sex abuse at Kendall Grange. Detective Darren Webster led the investigation and by the end of 2011, had a significant brief on McGrath and Brother John Clegg. Other brothers who allegedly committed other offences at the school were deceased or deemed unfit to be tried. In 2012, McGrath was charged again in relation to the new Kendall Grange allegations.

In 2012, Interpol put out an extradition request for McGrath, who travelled from Sri Lanka to Christchurch. He appealed his extradition to Australia and continued to fight in the courts for two years. The New Zealand High Court finally dismissed the appeal and on 23 December 2014 he was extradited to Australia.

As McGrath arrived in Australia, Brother Rodger Mount was deported from Papua New Guinea. He was arrested by Australian police on arrival, facing charges from four victims.

On 16 May 2017, McGrath's fourth trial began in the District Court of New South Wales. He was arraigned before an expanded jury of 15 on an indictment containing 129 counts, principally of a sexual nature against 15 victims. Due to the high number of complainants, the trial was split into two.

On 16 February 2018, McGrath was sentenced to 33 years' imprisonment for 64 offences against 12 boys at Kendall Grange. The second trial began in 2019 and he was sentenced to a further 29 years' imprisonment for offences against 15 boys at Kendall Grange.

In her sentencing remarks, Judge Sarah Huggett said that she had "no doubt at all that systemic abuse of children at Kendall Grange was taking place during the period of McGrath's offending". Hugget also said: "I found the offender to be a most unpersuasive, manipulative and unconvincing witness" and "not a witness of truth". She added: "The undeniable fact remains that this offender knowingly engaged in a deliberate course of prolonged and serious sexual abuse. He completely disregarded and exploited the powerlessness and vulnerability of his victims for his own motivations. He appreciated the wrongfulness of his conduct and on many occasions used techniques to secure a victim's silence. The offender as an educated adult must have appreciated the harm at least his more serious offences were causing. Yet he acted with complete disregard for those inevitable consequences...it must be remembered that he committed so many offences upon 12 victims over many years. He was a predator and there was no sign he was stopping as he moved from one victim to the next."

In March 2025, the award of the New Zealand 1990 Commemoration Medal to McGrath was cancelled and annulled.

== Cover-up ==
The cover-up of McGrath's crimes began more than 20 years before he was finally arrested. In 1977, reports of McGrath's abuse of children reached Brother Brian O'Donnell, the head of the order in Sydney. At least one other brother, a teacher and several members of staff reported their concerns to O'Donnell.

Following a short internal investigation and despite serious allegations of child sexual abuse, O'Donnell transferred McGrath to Kendall Grange in New South Wales. Like Marylands, Kendall Grange was a school for disadvantaged boys. In 1980, McGrath became headmaster of the school and by his own admissions, his offending increased significantly.

When more allegations emerged in the early 1990s, the order's provincial, Brother Joseph Smith, followed Catholic Church protocol and took McGrath to meet Father Brian Lucas, a priest and civil lawyer. Lucas was head of the church's Special Issues Resource Group tasked with responding to the emerging scandal of child sex abuse by priests and brothers.

Lucas, Smith and McGrath met at St Mary's Cathedral in Sydney and McGrath confessed to Lucas that he was an abuser. Following the meeting, Smith accompanied McGrath to the United States for treatment. Despite McGrath's confession, neither Lucas or Smith reported him to the police. Instead, McGrath was moved out of Australia in an attempt to avoid scandal.

== McGrath's trials ==
Trials & Convictions
Location	Trial No.	Year	Conviction	Sentence	Ref.
High Court of New Zealand, Christchurch	1	23 December 1993	Guilty – 10 offences of child sexual abuse against 6 boys at Marylands and Hebron Trust, Christchurch.	3 years imprisonment	
District Court of NSW, Australia	2	1997	Guilty – 6 offences of child sexual abuse against 6 boys at Kendall Grange, Morisset.	9 months imprisonment	
High Court of New Zealand, Christchurch	3	2006	Guilty – 21 offences of child sexual abuse against 9 boys at Marylands, Christchurch	5 years imprisonment	
District Court of NSW, Australia	4	2018	Guilty – 64 offences of child sexual abuse against 12 boys (1978–1985) at Kendall Grange, Morisset.	33 years imprisonment	
District Court of NSW, Australia	5	2019	Guilty – 51 offences of child sexual abuse against 15 boys at Kendall Grange, Morisset.	27 years imprisonment	

== Government inquiries ==
=== Victorian parliamentary inquiry ===
On 29 April 2013, Brother Timothy Graham, the provincial of the Hospitaller Order of St John of God, Oceania province, gave evidence before the Victorian Parliamentary Inquiry Into The Handling of Child Abuse by Religious and Other Organisations. He was asked about Brother Brian O'Donnell, the provincial of the order in 1977. O'Donnell was quoted as saying that "... no allegations of sexual misconduct involving brothers ... was ever documented and would be held in archives. This practice was followed in order to deal with the situation in its actual context without compromising the good name of the person in the future. By that I am referring to the brother against whom the allegation had been made." O'Donnell was also quoted as saying "... I made mention in my earlier statement to police that the attitude within the order was one of reacting to a religious failing to keep his vow of chastity. We were dealing with a sin rather than a crime. The attitude was that a sinner can repent and be forgiven and give up sinning."

O'Donnell's police statement makes reference to his decision to move McGrath and Moloney in 1977: "... as a result of the number of allegations received in and around this time that I as provincial saw the need for a clean-out at Marylands, Christchurch. It has also been suggested that McGrath and Moloney were moved on because of the sexual allegations and that I put Brother Timothy (Boxall) in as Prior to bring about necessary changes. This is in a sense correct."

=== Royal Commission into Institutional Responses to Child Sexual Abuse (Australia) ===
The commission were unable to conduct a public hearing into the order because of the risk of prejudicing the trials of McGrath and Brother John Clegg. Clegg was found guilty in 2015 of multiple offences against boys at Kendall Grange.

The commission held private hearings from survivors and families who suffered as a result of the order.

=== Royal Commission of Inquiry into Abuse in Care (New Zealand) ===
As part of the investigation into abuse in the care of the Catholic Church, the New Zealand inquiry will investigate the nature and extent of the abuse that occurred at Marylands School, Christchurch. One accuser, Donald Daniel Ku, would testify before the Commission in February 2022, claiming that McGrath sexually abused him in 1963 while he was a student Marylands School and also put him in a coffin containing a dead body. Other accusers who were former students at Marylands School would testify before the commission as well.

In early August 2023, the Royal Commission of Inquiry into Abuse in Care's interim report identified McGraw as a "prolific abuser" at Marylands School. McGraw had served at Marylands School for four years before being transferred to Kendall Grange boys home near Newcastle.

== Police ==
In December 2020, Detectives Darren Webster and Scott Selkirk from Strike Force Lozano were awarded for their work on the McGrath case.

== Revelation television documentary series ==
In 2019, journalist Sarah Ferguson and producer Nial Fulton gained access to the NSW District Court to film McGrath's fifth trial as part of their ABC television series Revelation. They also negotiated access to interview McGrath in his maximum security prison in Cessnock, New South Wales. During his interview, McGrath admitted the order had covered up his sexual offending against children for decades and moved him to prevent scandal and police investigation. He said he understood both he and Roger Moloney were moved from Christchurch in 1977 because of their sexual offending against children.

McGrath told Ferguson he confessed his sexual abuse of children to Father Brian Lucas and Brother Joseph Smith in 1992 but neither reported it to the police. McGrath explained how Smith personally delivered him to a treatment centre in Jemez Springs, New Mexico, despite Smith being aware of at least four allegations of child sexual abuse against McGrath.

McGrath also alleged he had been sexually abused by two other brothers in the order and described a toxic culture of sexual abuse, concealment and fear.

== Offenders from the St John of God order ==
Of the 37 brothers who ministered in the Christchurch community, 21 had allegations of abuse made against them. Nineteen brothers had specific allegations of child sexual abuse made against them.

In addition to McGrath, other members of the St John of God order have been convicted of child sexual abuse. They include:

St John of God Paedophiles
Name	Religious Name	Location of Offences	Conviction	Sentence	Status	Ref.
Brother Roger William Moloney	–	Marylands, Christchurch, New Zealand	Guilty: 7 offences against 5 children	2 Years, 9 months Imprisonment	Deceased	
Brother John Marshall Clegg	–	Kendall Grange, Morisset, New South Wales	Guilty: 11 offences against 2 children	7 years imprisonment	Prison – 2017 – 2022	
Brother Roger Melville Mount	Gabriel	Churinga, Victoria	Guilty: 13 offences against 2 children	7 years, 10 months	Prison	
Brother Daniel Slattery	Daniel	Kendall Grange, Morisset, New South Wales	Guilty: 12 offences against 3 boys	Awaiting sentencing	Custody	
Brother William John Lebler	Thaddeus	Marylands, Christchurch, New Zealand	Deemed unfit to stand trial	St John of God substantiated Lebler's offending	Deceased	
Brother Raymond John Garchow	Richard	Marylands, Christchurch, New Zealand	8 offences against children, St John of God substantiated Garchow's offending	Deemed unfit to stand trial	Deceased, 2011	
Brother John Joseph Donnellan	Bede	Kendall Grange, Morisset, New South Wales	5 offences, St John of God substantiated Donnellan's offending	Died before charges were laid	Deceased	

== See also ==
- Congregation of the Servants of the Paraclete
