= Royal Commission of Inquiry into Abuse in Care =

New Zealand royal commission

Logo of the Royal Commission of Inquiry into Abuse in Care

The Royal Commission of Inquiry into Historical Abuse in State Care and in the Care of Faith-based Institutions was established by the New Zealand Government in 2018 to inquire into and report upon allegations of historical abuse to children, young people and adults in state care and in the care of faith-based institutions in New Zealand between 1950 and 1999.

The royal commission was established pursuant to the Inquiries Act 2013. It heard the accounts of more than 3,000 survivors over more than five years. The royal commission's final report and recommendations were publicly released on 24 July 2024. The 3,000-page report concluded that between 113,000 and 253,000 children, young people and adults had been abused and neglected at state and faith-based institutions in New Zealand between 1950 and 1999. The commission made 138 recommendations and called for political, religious, public service, professional and care provider leaders to issue public apologies as well as law changes to relevant legislation.

== Background ==
On 6 July 2017, 200 abuse survivors gathered at the New Zealand Parliament with Race Relations Commissioner Dame Susan Devoy. Devoy delivered a petition and an open letter from ActionStation demanding an inquiry into abuse in care and a public apology. Nine abuse survivors also spoke. Green Party co-leader Metiria Turei and Māori Party co-leader Marama Fox received the documents. Calls for an inquiry into abuse in care had been supported by survivors, community leaders, most political parties except the National Party, the Human Rights Commission, Iwi Leaders Forum, Māori Women's Welfare League and the United Nations Committee on the Elimination of Racial Discrimination.

== Launch ==
On 1 February 2018, Prime Minister Jacinda Ardern and Minister of Internal Affairs Tracey Martin confirmed that the New Zealand Cabinet agreed to establish an inquiry into abuse in state care between 1950 and 1999 under the 2013 Inquiries Act. Former Governor General Rt Hon Sir Anand Satyanand was appointed as the chair of the Royal Commission and member of the Inquiry. He was tasked with consulting on the draft terms of reference for the Royal Commission. Following the consultation period, Cabinet would decide the terms of references, additional Inquiry members and the Inquiry's final budget. The Royal Commission submitted its report on the terms of reference to the Government on 30 May 2018. By 4 October, 497 people had registered to engage with the Royal Commission's inquiries.

On 12 November 2018, the Government announced the terms of the inquiry and also widened its scope to include abuse in faith based institutions. The inquiry was also renamed "Royal Commission into Historical Abuse in State Care and in the Care of Faith-Based Institutions" to reflect its widened scope. The Government confirmed that the inquiry would begin hearing evidence from January 2019 with a final report summarising its findings and recommendations being submitted to the Governor-General in January 2023. The Government allocated the Royal Commission a budget of NZ$78.85 million over four years, including $15 million to provide participants with counselling and related support.

== Commissioners and executive ==
On 1 February 2018, the Government appointed former Governor-General Rt Hon Sir Anand Satyanand as the Inquiry Chair and a member of the Inquiry.

Other commissioners included :

- Jude Sandra Alofivae MNZN – Commissioner, November 2018–August 2023
- Lawyer Julia Steenson – Commissioner, June 2020–February 2023
- Judge Coral Shaw – Chair, November 2019–June 2024
- Dr Andrew Erueti – Commissioner, November 2019–June 2024
- Paul Gibson – Commissioner, November 2019–June 2024

In August 2019, Satyanand announced his resignation from the commission. In a surprise announcement, he cited the growing workload, which was higher than predicted, and his age of 75. He left the Commission in November 2019 and became the chancellor of the University of Waikato. Coral Shaw took over as chair, and Julia Steenson joined the Commission in June 2020.

The Chair and Commissioners were supported by a secretariat led by an Executive Director. The Inquiry had three Executive Directors:

- Mervin Singham, April 2018–June 2021
- Helen Potiki, July 2021–February 2024
- Benesia Smith, March 2024–June 2024

The Inquiry was also assisted by two lead senior counsel Simon Mount KC and Kerry Beaton, KC. The Department of Internal Affairs was responsible for administering the independent inquiry.

== Hearings ==
In January 2020, Royal Commission Chair Coral Shaw met with the Māori King Tūheitia Paki at Tūrangawaewae. Throughout 2020, the Royal Commission held several fono (forums) for Pasifika New Zealanderss nationwide. The Commission also released its annual report in June 2020. The work of the commission was delayed by the COVID-19 pandemic in New Zealand, with reduced sessions from March through June 2020.

By September 2020, the Commission had held 500 private sessions. Throughout early 2021, several public hearings were held for faith-based redress and state-run children's homes. The Government granted the Royal Commission a five-month extension, with a final report due in June 2023.

Public hearings continued in late 2022, focusing on survivors of abuse in foster care and psychiatric institutions for the disabled. By the time of the deadline for survivors' restrictions on 21 March 2023, over 4,000 abuse survivors had registered. In April 2023, the Royal Commission's deadline was further extended from 30 June 2023 to 28 March 2024. On 28 March 2024, the New Zealand Cabinet agreed to extend the Commission's deadline to 26 June 2024.

=== Lake Alice Psychiatric Hospital ===
On 14 June 2021, the Abuse in Care Inquiry began hearing from former young patients at the Lake Alice Psychiatric Hospital. During the 1970s, patients were reportedly subjected to medication and electroconvulsive therapy as a punishment. There are 40 witnesses including 20 former patients. Several participants had experienced torture and neglect at the hands of its consultant psychiatrist Dr Selwyn Leeks.

On 15 December 2022, the Royal Commission's inquiry into the Lake Alice hospital was presented to Parliament.

=== Marylands School, Christchurch ===
Between 9–17 February 2022, the Abuse in Care Inquiry began hearing from survivors of child sexual abuse perpetrated by The Hospitaller Order of St John of God at Marylands School, St Joseph's Orphanage and the Hebron Trust. Marylands School was a residential facility for boys, including many with disabilities.

The Commission investigated the nature and extent of the abuse that occurred, why it happened and the impacts of that abuse.

Dr Christopher Longhurst, from the Survivors Networks of those Abused by Priests (SNAP) labelled St John of God's apologies as hollow. Longhurst pointed out that church leaders initially opposed that faith-based institutions be included in the commission. Longhurst said ...where was their shame decades ago when child victims and their parents first reported abuse? Where was their shame when disgraced brothers were shipped overseas instead of facing justice? Where was their shame when some of their victims took their own lives?

In addition to survivor testimonies, the commission also heard evidence from survivor advocates, former employees of St John of God, NZ Police and Brother Timothy Graham, the current Provincial of St John of God.

The Commission heard that despite its small size, the Order of St John of God was responsible for 14% of all recorded abuse in New Zealand's Catholic Church.

A former nun, Dr Michelle Mulvihill told the Commission she had been employed by St John of God to respond to hundreds of sexual abuse claims in Australia and New Zealand. In 2002, Mulvihill made 13 trips to New Zealand and met scores of victims, some in prison, many homeless and others suffering mental health problems. She was sent to negotiate settlements with the victims and told the Commission she believed 91% of religious brothers at Marylands were abusing children.

Mulvihill said the Order had a culture of concealing abuse perpetrated by its members and in 2002, an Australian class action ensured the identities of sex offenders within the Order of St John of God was kept secret. Over 120 complaints were made about abuse at Marylands and the majority against the notorious Brother Bernard McGrath. The now deceased principal, Brother Roger Moloney, was sentenced to 35 month's jail for sexually abusing children. Other brothers, including Raymond Garchow, William Lebler and Celsus Griffin were all named as child sex abusers.

Mulvihill said that Lebler was allowed to answer calls from victims, even after allegations had been made against him. Moloney, who was sentenced to prison in New Zealand for child abuse, played a prominent role in Australian settlements as the Order's bursar.

Mulvihill said St John of God's protection of its ...outrageous wealth, its members deviant sexual behaviour and their obedience to 'closing ranks' was indefensible and unforgivable.

In her closing statement, Chair Coral Shaw said ...the shocking abuse included and is admitted, included grooming, child rape, vicious physical abuse and neglect, neglect of the vulnerable children's need for nature and education. We acknowledge and applaud the willingness of the survivors to share these painful experiences and describe the lifelong impacts they have to continue to endure.

In August 2023, a critical inquiry into the Order of the Brothers of St John of God at Marylands School and the associated Hebron Trust was published.

=== Māori plaintiffs ===
On 7 March 2022, the Royal Commission began hearing from Māori individuals who had experienced abuse as children while in state and faith–based care. The hearing is expected to last for two weeks until 18 March and is hosted by Ngāti Whātua at Ōrākei marae. The first plaintiff Tupua Urlich testified about how he and his sister were separated from their mother and experienced abuse at the hands of a caregiver.

On 8 March, five Waikato siblings testified about being beaten and exploited as child labour by their foster family between the late 1990s and 2001. Though Oranga Tamariki was aware about the abuse experienced by the children, the department opted to work with their foster family instead of rehousing the children. Following four years of abuse, one of the children spoke to a school counsellor who successfully petitioned for the children's removal from the foster family. The children subsequently were separated when they were rehomed with different families and testified about their loss of connection to Māori culture and identity.

On 9 March, a plaintiff named Ms AF testified that welfare authorities erased her Māori birth mother from her birth certificate to facilitate her assimilation into a Catholic Pākehā/European family. Ms AF talked about being cut off from her Māori family and identity. She also claimed that she had been sexually abused by an uncle during her childhood and that she was raped by an acquaintance of her uncle as a teenager.

On 16 March, a plaintiff known as "MM" testified about encountering violence, sexual abuse, bullying, and racism while in state care. "MM" also claimed that his Māori heritage was denigrated while in state care. Due to his abuse, "MM" became involved in gangs and spent most of his adult life in prison. On 17 March, another plaintiff named Natasha Emery attributed the "intergenerational abuse" experienced by her and her family to the abuse they had experienced in state and foster care.

On 18 March, the Royal Commission concluded its two-week hearing into Māori experiences of abuse in state care. The Commission covered a range of issues including family separations, children experiencing psychical, psychological and sexual abuse in state care, slave labour, forced assimilation, and a failure by relevant authorities to address such abuses.

=== State foster care plaintiffs ===
Between 13 and 17 June 2022, the Royal Commission of Inquiry heard from individuals who had experienced abuse in state foster care. This marked the twelfth public hearing carried out by the Royal Commission of Inquiry investigating historical abuse in both state and faith-based care between 1950 and 1999.

Plaintiffs testified that they experienced beatings, forced labour, malnutrition, sexual abuse, neglect, force-feeding, and losing contact with their birth families. Several plaintiffs also criticised social workers for not intervening to protect them from abuse at the hands of their foster parents and carers. Survivors also talked about the long term effects of their abuse including being unable to form relationships as adults, crime, and alcoholism. Former social workers and academics Professor Emily Keddell and Dr Ian Hyslop called for an institutional reform of the child and family welfare and protection system, with particularly attention to the needs of Māori.

=== Disabled, deaf, and mental health institution care ===
On 11 July 2022, the Royal Commission of Inquiry began hearing from 23 disabled, deaf, and mental health institutional care plaintiffs who had experienced abuse at several state institutions between 1950 and 1999. These institutions have included the Kimberley Centre, the Templeton Centre, Porirua Hospital, Tokanui Psychiatric Hospital, the Kelston Deaf Education Centre, Homai School, Carrington Hospital, Kingseat Hospital, and Māngere Hospital. Plaintiffs testified that they had experienced beatings, being overprescribed medicines, forced feeding, starvation, sexual abuse (including rape), and neglect at the hands of staff members.

After eight days of testimonies, the Royal Commission of Inquiry into disability, deaf, and mental health institutional care concluded its hearings. In addition to accounts of physical, mental, and sexual abuse, several Māori and Pasifika plaintiffs testified that they had received racist abuse and discrimination. Former patient Caroline Arrell advocated the establishment of a Ministry of Vulnerable Adults to provide care and monitoring for disabled individuals. Another patient Allison Campbell called for people in care to receive an independent non-governmental advocate. Mike Ferris of the Citizens Commission for Human Rights praised the hearing for shedding light on decades of abuse and called for a holistic approach to engaging with disabled individuals.

=== Mongrel Mob ===
On 13 August 2022, former Lake Alice psychiatric hospital patient Paul Zentveld met at a weekend hui (meeting) in Raglan organised by the Waikato chapter of the Mongrel Mob to encourage members to participate in the Royal Commission of Inquiry into Abuse in Care in order to seek redress. Several gang members had lived at boys' institutions including Epuni in Lower Hutt and Kohitere Boy's Training Centre in Levin where they had experienced abuse and mistreatment.

=== State agencies ===
In mid-August 2022, the Royal Commission of Inquiry began hearing testimony from state agencies, focusing on their failure to address the abuse of children in their care between 1950 and 1999. The hearing was expected to last for ten days and heard testimonies from 14 stage agencies including Oranga Tamariki (the Ministry of Children), the New Zealand Police, the Department of Corrections, Te Puni Kōkiri (the Ministry for Māori Development), the Ministry for Pacific Peoples, the Ministry of Social Development (MSD), Ministry of Education, Whaikaha - Ministry of Disabled People, and the Ministry of Health. The Royal Commission questioned the state agencies about their efforts to meet their Treaty of Waitangi obligations, monitoring of systems for abuse and neglect, and how they handled complaints.

On 16 August, the Ministry of Social Development's chief executive Debbie Power was questioned by the Royal Commission. The commission's counsel Anne Toohey submitted evidence about the Ministry's failure to monitor abuse at various institutions under its supervision including Horowhenua's Kohitere Boys Training Centre, which attracted 228 complaints covering 812 allegations of sexual, physical and emotional abuse. While Power testified that MSD had enacted policies to address these complaints, Toohey questioned why the Ministry had allowed an employee facing allegations of abuse to remain in their employment at a youth justice facility.

On 17 August, Police Commissioner Andrew Coster and Deputy Commissioner Tania Kura admitted that children had been abused in police custody during the 1970s and 1980s. The commission had also earlier heard plaintiffs testifying about racism and beatings including teenagers being beaten with phone books in order not to leave marks on their bodies.

On 21 August, Teaching Council of Aotearoa New Zealand chief executive Lesley Hoskin confirmed that it was taking action to ensure that teachers could demonstrate competence in the Māori language and culture in order to address the over-representation of Māori children in state care and abuse.

On 22 August, Oranga Tamariki's chief executive Chappie Te Kani admitted that the state agency had made multiple failings in preventing and reporting the abuse of children in its care. Te Kani acknowledged that Oranga Tamariki had not believed reports of abuse and failed to investigate them, leading to a lack of accountability for perpetrators and increasing the risk of abuse and harm suffered by victims. Te Kani also stated that the child care and protection system that existed between 1950 and 1999 had failed to meet the needs of mentally disabled, Māori and Pasifika children. Te Kani also acknowledged that Oranga Tamariki's poor data collection practices meant that the organisation had no figures on Māori and Pasifika children entrusted to its care. Deputy chief executive Nicolette Dickson also acknowledged that the agency's failings had created mistrust between Māori and European New Zealanders (Pākehā) involved in state care.

On 24 August, the Royal Commission released its Care to Custody: Incarceration Rates Research Report, which found that children in state care had a higher rate of imprisonment as adults. The report found that one third of children living in state care later served prison sentences. In addition, the report found that Māori children and young people had a higher rate of imprisonment than other ethnic groups, with 42% later serving custodial sentences as adults. The report drew upon the interagency records of more than 30,000 children and young people between 1950 and 1999. The Care to Custody report was welcomed as a vindication by former state care wards Hohepa Taiaroa and Arthur William Taylor, who attributed their state care experiences to their descent into the prison system as adults. On 25 August, the Royal Commission questioned the Department of Corrections over the management of imprisoned state care abuse survivors. During questioning, Juanita Ryan, Corrections' deputy chief executive of health services, admitted that the department did not have specific therapeutic programmes for prisoners who had been former state wards.

On 26 August, the Royal Commission's hearing into state institutions' responses to the abuse of children and young people in state care concluded. Public Service Commissioner Peter Hughes apologised on behalf of the Government to former state care wards for failing to protect them from abuse while in state care and for MSD's mismanagement of their claims, which had caused them further harm. Hughes also stated that the Government had "lost sight of the human beings at the centre of the claims." Hughes also called on Oranga Tamariki to listen to the needs of children. Several survivors including Keith Wiffin, Frances Tagaloa, and Jim Goodwin accepted the Government's apology but called for the establishment of an independent service monitoring state care services and for more accountability from state agencies.

=== Faith-based institutions ===
The Commission heard from the leaders of several faith-based institutions between 13 and 20 October 2022 in Auckland. Institutions that participated in the hearing included the Gloriavale Christian Community, Dilworth School, St Patrick's College, Silverstream, Wesley College, and the leaders of the Anglican Church in Aotearoa, New Zealand and Polynesia, the Catholic Church in New Zealand, the Methodist Church of New Zealand, the Presbyterian Church of Aotearoa New Zealand and its social outreach ministries Presbyterian Support Central and Presbyterian Support Otago. In addition to being questioned on how they addressed abuse allegations by survivors, the organisations were questioned about the monitoring of care systems, how those in care were protected from abuse, and how they met their Treaty of Waitangi, Māori, Pacific, disabled, and mental health obligations. This hearing was convened in response to a 2021 report criticising faith-based institutions for failing to protect children in their care. This hearing is the final hearing before commissioners assess the information gathered in the Royal Commission of Inquiry and issue a report to the Governor-General of New Zealand in June 2023.

On 13 October, Gloriavale leader Howard Temple testified before the Royal Commission, acknowledging that there had been intergenerational abuse at the insular religious community. Gloriavale's leadership also confirmed that they had instituted reforms including allowing family members to spend more time together and implementing new policies around child protection, bullying and sexual harassment, and external investigations of abuse allegations.

Between 17 and 18 October, the Royal Commission heard from several Catholic representatives including Bishop Patrick Dunn, Cardinal John Dew, the Society of Mary's Father Tim Duckworth, St Patrick's College Silverstream's Clare Couch and Dr Paul Flanagan of the Church's National Safeguarding and Professional Standards Committee, who apologised for abuse against children and young people in the care of Catholic institutions. In addition, the Royal Commission also heard from several abuse survivors including Dr Filip Katavake-McGrath and Moeapulu Frances Tagaloa. The commission had heard at least 1,680 reports of abuse including sexual, physical and emotional abuse at Catholic institutions between 1950 and 1999. Bishop Dunn was also questioned for recommending Tongan priest Sateki Raass, who was subsequently convicted for sexually assaulting a minor, for a teaching job.

On 19 October, former Dilworth principal Murray Wilton apologised for sexual abuses committed by twelve former staff members who had been charged and prosecuted as part of the Operation Beverly police investigation. On 20 October, Dilworth Trust chairman Aaron Snodgrass appeared before the Royal Commission and testified that the school was taking action to address historical abuse including an independent inquiry and a redress programme. Abuse survivors including Neil Harding and Greg Evans criticised Dilworth's redress efforts for allegedly marginalising survivors and disputed claims by the school's leadership denials of a cover-up of abuse that had occurred at Dilworth.

On 19 October, the Methodist Church of NZ and Wesley College representatives publicly apologised to abuse survivors for bullying and abuse that former students had experienced. Methodist Church general secretary Reverend Tara Tautari apologised on behalf of the church for failing to protect and look after the well-being of those entrusted to its care. The church's lawyer Maria Dew KC confirmed that the church had resolved or was in the process of resolving 20 of its 28 redress claims. Wesley College alumni and Moana Pasifika rugby player Sekope Kepu also testified about the abuse he had experienced and talked about his former school's efforts to address bullying.

On 20 October, Presbyterian Support Otago (PSO) chief executive Jo O'Neill testified about historical abuses that had occurred at its Glendining Presbyterian Children's Homes in Andersons Bay in Dunedin. Three of the abuses had occurred between 1950 and 1960 while three of the abuses had occurred between the late 1980s and 1991. O'Neill also testified that records about children housed under PSO's care had been deliberately destroyed by an alleged paedophile ring between 2017 and 2018. O'Neill also apologised to abuse survivors. In response to O'Neill's testimony, the Presbyterian Church of Aotearoa New Zealand launched an inquiry into an alleged child sex ring operating within Dunedin's Presbyterian community. On 5 November, the Presbyterian Church in Dunedin confirmed that it had appointed a King's Counsel to investigate the paedophile ring allegations.

== Interim reports ==
The Commission released its first interim report on 16 December 2020. The report estimated that about 250,000 people were abused in state-based and faith-based care, though this figure may be conservative and it will be impossible to determine the precise number of people abused, because of data gaps and deficiencies. It reported that most of the abused came from Māori and Pacific families, disabled people, and women and girls. It found that abusive behaviour ranged from common physical assaults and sexual abuse through to unreasonable physical restraint, cruel, inhuman and degrading treatment, and medical procedures such as ECT therapy as punishment. The commission's interim report said the state's redress processes so far had been overly focused on financial implications to the state, rather than on providing appropriate compensation to survivors and ensuring their wellbeing. It also said that survivors who made claims were frequently disbelieved and forced to retell their experiences again and again, retraumatising them.

On 15 December 2021, the Commission released a second interim report which found that survivors' requests for redress were often rejected by authorities or their abuse downplayed, disbelieved or dismissed. The Commission found that agencies and institutions responsible for the abuse denied there was a systemic problem and feared the potential financial cost of settling with claimants. The commission also criticised the inadequacy of the current redress systems at government agencies and faith-based institutions. As a result, the inquiry made 95 recommendations including the creation of a new redress process and a public apology to survivors. The commission also recommended that the Government enact legislation enshrining that children in care should be protected from abuse and that the Government be held liable for any such abuses.

In response to the commission's 2021 report, Prime Minister Ardern refused to confirm whether the Government would adopt the commission's recommendation that children in state care should be legally protected from abuse. In mid-December 2021, the Government's Oversight of Oranga Tamariki System and Children and Young People's Commission Bill passed its first reading. The proposed Bill deals with oversight of the government department Oranga Tamariki, which is responsible for looking after children in state care. During the submission stage, several submissions expressed concern that the legislation would weaken oversight of Oranga Tamariki.

== Final report ==
The Commission originally intended to release a final report with recommendations to the government by 3 January 2023.

In mid April 2023, the minister responsible for the Royal Commission, Barbara Edmonds, announced that the Government had delayed the release of the report by nine months until 28 March 2024, stating that the commission had received a large amount of new evidence in late 2022. While Edmonds confirmed that the public apology would be delayed until the release of the inquiry's final report, she stated that work to establish a new redress system for survivors would not be affected by the deadline extension. The Government also appointed Annabel Ahuriri-Driscoll and Ruth Jones QSM as the co-chairs tasked with designing the new redress scheme. Survivor Hohepa Taiaroa expressed disappointment at the report's delay while University of Auckland associate professor Stephen Winter opined that the delay was an opportunity for the commission to get the abuse report right.

On 2 August 2023, the Royal Commission released an interim report, titled "Stolen Lives, Marked Souls" to the Governor-General. The interim report focused on three Catholic institutions in Christchurch run by the Order of Saint John of God: Marylands School, Hebron Trust, and St Joseph's Orphanage. The report documented several cases of depravity, sexual, physical and spiritual abuse at these institutions, with Marylands School and Hebron Trust described as "hell on earth." The three institutions served disabled and vulnerable children and young people. The interim report also identified Australian convicted sex offender Brother Bernard McGrath as a "prolific abuser" at Marylands School.

In late March 2024, the Royal Commission's recommendations were delivered to Minister of Internal Affairs Brooke Van Velden. On 25 June 2024, the commission's final report was submitted to Governor-General Cindy Kiro. The commission of inquiry lasted five and a half years and was New Zealand's biggest and most expensive inquiry to date, costing $170 million. The report and recommendations would be made public after the Government tabled the report in Parliament in late July 2024.

On 24 July 2024, the Royal Commission publicly released its 3,000=page final report. The report concluded that between 113,000 and 253,000 children, young people and adults had been abused and neglected at state and faith-based institutions in New Zealand between 1950 and 1999. The commissioners made 138 recommendations including ensuring the safety of children, youths and adults in care, empowering and investing in families (whānau) and communities and creating a Ministry for the Care System to oversee the care system and implement the Royal Commission's recommendations. The final report also urged the Government to implement the 95 recommendations of the commission's 2021 interim report. The report also called upon political, religious, public service, professional and care provider leaders to issue public apologies as well as law changes to relevant legislation.

Notable case studies covered in the final report included the Hokio Beach School and Kohitere Boy's Training Centre, the psychopaedic Kimberley Centre, Van Asch College and Kelson School for the Deaf, the Te Whakapakari Youth Programme on Great Barrier Island and the Jehovah's Witnesses faith. The Hokio Beach School (Hokio School) and Kohitere Boys' Training Centre (Kohitere Centre) were residential social welfare institutions that ran between the early 1900s and the late 1980s. Former wards experienced abuse, violence and racism, with several subsequently going to prison or joining gangs. The Kimberley Centre was an institution for children with learning disabilities that ran between 1945 and 2006. At the time, disabled people were institutionalised. Survivors reported poor nutrition, poor healthcare and culture neglect for Māori and Pasifika residents.

Van Asch College and Kelson School for the Deaf were schools for deaf children. Both schools adopted a strict oralist approach to deaf education with sign language being banned until 1979. Survivors reported being denied access to Sign Language and deaf culture in classes, educational neglect, institutionalisation, and experiencing regular physical and sexual abuse at the hands of staff and peers. The Te Whakapakari Youth Programme was an outdoor and Māori culture-focused rehabilitative boot camp in Great Barrier Island for youth offenders and state wards that ran between 1977 and 2004. Participants experienced psychological, physical and sexual abuse. The Jehovah's Witnesses came under the purview of the Royal Commission due to the faith's inadequate policies and steps for reporting and handling abuses within their community.

The Commission found "deeply suspicious" evidence of a child sex ring involving central government politicians in the 1980s, but was ultimately unable to substantiate it following a separate investigation. Following his death in September 2024 former health minister Aussie Malcolm was identified as a subject of the investigation.

== Responses ==
=== Political ===
On 22 July 2024 Prime Minister Christopher Luxon announced that he would make a formal public apology on 12 November 2024 to victims of abuse in state and faith-based care. The apology ceremony will take place at Parliament, and will be livestreamed to public venues in Auckland, Wellington and Christchurch.

During the public release of the final report on 24 July, Luxon said "I cannot take away your pain, but I can tell you this: you are heard, and you are believed. I say to the survivors, the burden is no longer yours to carry alone. The state is now standing here beside you, accountable and ready to take action." Government MPs Erica Stanford, Jenny Marcroft, Casey Costello and Karen Chhour also spoke during the release, with Marcroft revealing that her mother was subject to electroshock therapy as a university student, Costello recounting meeting young abuse victims as a Police officer and Chhour promising change within the care system. Opposition MPs Debbie Ngarewa-Packer and Chlöe Swarbrick criticised the National-led coalition government for proceeding with its boot camp programme in light of revelations of abuse at the Te Whakapakari boot camp during the 1970s.

=== Catholic Church ===
On 24 November 2017 Bill Kilgallon, the director of the Catholic Church's National Office for Professional Standards, urged the Government to include faith-based institutions within the scope of the Royal Commission of Inquiry.

On 26 March 2021, Cardinal John Dew, the Archbishop of Wellington and president of New Zealand Catholic Bishops Conference, apologised to abuse victims in the Royal Commission of Inquiry and stated that its systems and culture must change.

In response to the Royal Inquiry, the leadership of the Catholic Church in New Zealand requested in January 2023 that their organisations audit the names of Catholic buildings, prizes and portraits to ensure they were not named after abusers or people who had failed to act against abuse. Earlier, the former Kavanagh College in Dunedin had been renamed Trinity Catholic College in response to revelations that its namesake Bishop John Kavanagh had failed to act on complaints of sexual abuse by priests. As part of a "ten point statement," the Catholic leadership also reiterated their support for an independent entity to investigate reports of abuse and redress as part of the Church's response to the ongoing Royal Commission of Inquiry on Abuse in Care. In response to the Catholic Church's "ten-point statement," Catholic theologian and Survivors Network of those Abused by Priests Aotearoa leader Dr Chris Longhurst accused the Church of failing to meet with survivors and of conducting a "cover-up."

On 24 July 2024, New Zealand Catholic Bishops Conference (NZCBC) President Bishop Steve Lowe and Congregational Leaders' Conference Aotearoa New Zealand (CLCANZ) President Father Thomas Rouse welcomed the final report of the Royal Commission, and said that the Church would work with authorities and abuse survivors to address historical abuse and combat contemporary abuse within the Church.

=== Gloriavale ===
On 20 January 2025, Gloriavale Christian Community's Overseeing Shepherd Howard Templeton issued a public apology to the community's victims of historical abuse, saying that Gloriavale "offered its deepest apologies for the abuse and that the leadership of the time had not reported known instances of abuse to the authorities." The Royal Commission had earlier requested that Gloriavale apologise to abuse survivors in July 2024.

=== Jehovah's Witnesses ===
In early June 2023, the Jehovah's Witnesses church filed for legal action to be exempted from the Royal Commission's investigation into sexual and other abuse by faith-based institutions. Unlike other faith based groups investigated, the Jehovah's Witnesses do not operate hospitals, schools, orphanages or foster care services. Nor are children separated from their parents for Sunday School or Youth Group. The church has sought a judicial review and High Court declaration that the church is not responsible for caring for children, young people, or vulnerable people.

Survivors network spokesperson Steve Goodlass expressed concern that other churches would use judicial reviews to avoid accountability for abuses. On 25 October 2023, the High Court in Wellington rejected the Jehovah's Witnesses' bid to be excluded from the Royal Commission's investigation.

On 24 June 2024, the Auckland High Court rejected an urgent claim filed by the Jehovah's Witnesses to obtain an advanced copy of the Abuse in Care Inquiry's final report into their church. A spokesperson for the Australasian Branch of Jehovah's Witnesses expressed disagreement with report's accuracy and asserted that child projection was of "utmost concern" to Jehovah's Witnesses. The sociologist Massimo Introvigne criticised the media attention directed at the Jehovah's Witnesses and disputed the report's finding of wrongdoing with the faith community's handling of abuse within their community.

Survivors of Church Abuse New Zealand spokesperson and former Jehovah's Witnesses elder Shayne Mechen said that former members were angered by the church's lack of regard for victims. On 23 July, the New Zealand Court of Appeal rejected another Jehovah's Witnesses's legal challenge to block part of the final report's release.

=== Presbyterian Church ===
Following the final report's release in late July 2024, former Presbyterian Support Otago (PSO) CEO Gillian Bremner was criticised by Male Survivors Otago for instructing a staff member to destroy records linked to historical abuse with the exception of registers and dates of children and young people in the organisation's care. In addition, New Zealand Law Society president Frazer Barton was criticised for advising the PSO that it could destroy the records of all children in its care. Barton had served as a PSO board member at the time of their destruction between 2017 and 2018. Barton resigned as Law Society president following a complaint filed by Cooper Legal partner Sam Benton. On 26 July, PSO CEO Jo O'Neill resigned from her position for undisclosed reasons, stating that "destroying the records was not a decision I would have made."

On 6 February 2025, Barton resumed his position as NZ Law Society president after a standards inquiry committee concluded that he had not breached their rules or committed "unsatisfactory conduct." On 27 September 2025, moderator Right Rev Rose Luxford issued an apology to abuse survivors who had been in the care of the Presbyterian Church. This apology was in response to the Royal Commission's findings historical abuse at religious and state-run institutions. 50 survivors attended the first apology ceremony at the Otago Museum in Dunedin. A second apology ceremony was held in Auckland on 4 October.

== National apology ==
On 12 September 2024, Lead Coordination Minister Erica Stanford would fund the travel expenses for survivors and one support person to attend the apology ceremony in Parliament or at a venue nearest to their home: the Due Drop Events Centre in Auckland, Shed 6 in Wellington or the Christchurch Town Hall. Registrations for attending the apology events would be held between 12 and 30 September. If demand for any of the public venues exceeds supply, a balloting system would be used with applicants being notified by 12 October. The balloting system drew criticism from several abuse survivors including Hanz Freller, Tu Chapman and Grant West, who described it as insincere, motivated by expediency and discriminatory against overseas-based survivors. In response to criticism, Stanford said that survivors unable to attend the apology event would be able to access the livestream online.

House Speaker Gerry Brownlee's initial decision to bar access to Newsroom journalist Aaron Smale drew criticism from both survivor groups and Parliamentary Press Gallery, the latter of whom appealed the decision. Smale had previous asked Luxon whether there was a link between tough and crime policies and gang membership, and had also criticised Children's Minister Karen Chhour for comparing the Government's boot camp programme to the Māori battalion. On 11 November, Brownlee reversed the ban and permitted Smale access to the National Apology on the condition that he was accompanied by a fellow Newsroom journalist.

On 12 November 2024, Prime Minister Luxon delivered the New Zealand Government's apology to survivors of abuse in state and faith-based care. Luxon described the Royal Commission of Inquiry into Abuse in State Care as "the largest, longest and most complex public inquiry ever held in New Zealand." He praised the over 2,400 survivors for being "incredibly brave" in sharing their experiences of abuse they had suffered while in state care, churches and other faith-based places. Luxon said that the Government was considering the Royal Commission's 138 recommendations. He also confirmed that the Government would invest $32 million into the current redress system until a replacement could be found, and that the Government would establish a $2 million fund to support organisations working with abuse survivors. He also confirmed that a National Remembrance Day would be held on 12 November 2025 to mark the first anniversary of the national apology.

200 abuse survivors attended the national apology at Parliament. In addition, several senior civil servants including Solicitor-General Una Jagose and Labour leader Chris Hipkins apologised for failings by government departments and the previous Labour Government. Several survivors questioned the sincerity of government figures' and senior public servants' apologies for abuse that occurred in state care due to the Government previously fighting compensation claims lodged by abuse survivors, lack of detail on compensation for abuse survivors and concerns about contemporary abuse in care.

On the same day, the Government confirmed that the Responding to Abuse in Care Legislation Amendment Bill would have its first reading in Parliament. The bill proposes banning strip searches for children in care, giving new search powers for people visiting youth justice facilities, strengthening restrictions for people working with minors, enforcing better record keeping for government agencies and amending the Crimes Act 1961 to include a definition of vulnerable adults. In response, University of Auckland political scientist Stephen Winter expressed concern that the Government's apology and proposed law changes would be inadequate without sufficient input from abuse survivors and proper funding for redress, counselling and accessing records.

== Restitution ==
On 14 August 2024, the Government announced that it would pay $20,000 each to a small group of survivors from the Lake Alice Psychiatric Hospital's Child and Adolescent Unit between 1972 and 1978. Lake Alice survivor Bruce Harkness had petitioned Erica Stanford, the lead coordination minister for the Government's response to the Royal Commission of Inquiry into Abuse in Care, on the day that the final report had been tabled.

On 18 December 2024, Stanford announced that the Government would offer Lake Alice survivors individual payments of at least $150,000, having set aside $22.68 million for the redress scheme. In addition, survivors could request for an individual assessment from an independent arbitrator.

In early January 2025, several survivors and advocates including Lake Alice survivor Joan Bellingham and advocate Ken Clearwater reiterated calls for the Government to release its redress plans.

On 19 February 2025, Stanford confirmed that the Government had established a $2 million dual purpose fund to honour children who died in care in unmarked graves. The inquiry had identified 4,000 unmarked graves in Auckland, Waikato, Nelson, New Zealand, Rangitikei, Horowhenua, Porirua, Otago, Westland and Canterbury. Local authorities will be able to apply for $50,000 lump sums to memorialise those buried in unmarked graves at psychiatric and psychopaedic sites. The fund will also be used to support community initiatives to support abuse survivors. That same day, a group of abuse survivors picketed the Accident Compensation Corporation's Christchurch office, demanding the company amend eligibility coverage policies for abuse survivors and opposing the Government's boot camp programme.

On 5 May 2025, Lake Alice survivor Malcolm Richards filed a legal challenge at the Wellington High Court seeking a judicial review of the Government's redress framework, contending that it breached international human rights laws. On 9 May, the Government allocated $774 million from the 2025 New Zealand budget towards the care system and improving redress for survivors of abuse in state care and faith-based institutions. The New Zealand Government declined to implement the Royal Commission's report that it establish an independent redress entity. In response, Labour Party leader Hipkins, Green co-leader Marama Davidson and Te Pāti Māori co-leader Debbie Ngarewa-Packer criticised the Government's refusal to create an independent redress entity as hurtful to abuse survivors.

== Criticisms ==
The inquiry faced criticism for appointing a gang member into a key role. Mongrel Mob member Harry Tam was employed as the inquiry's head of policy and research.

An abuse survivor accused the Commission of shutting down questions into conflicts of interest, saying that when he asked about commissioners' involvement with religious organisations, commissioners intervened to prevent further questions. The survivor received two letters of apology over the incident.

It was also criticised after some survivors were unclear on whether interviews they had done were part of the official hearings or were 'mock' sessions. Some survivors were concerned that evidence from those sessions would not be used and that they would need to repeat traumatising sessions. Commissioner Sandra Alofivae said that the interviews were official and evidence from them would be used, describing the sessions as "soft pilots".

A child sex offender was allowed to attend meetings with sexual violence survivors. The man, who is on the child sex offender register, was a partner of a person attending a panel. The Commission took three months after learning that the man had convictions to determine what they were. Internal Affairs Minister Tracey Martin said that her confidence in the Commissioner Paul Gibson "had been shaken" but later expressed confidence in the commission. Senior Commissioner Paul Gibson faced calls to resign but refused to do so.

In April 2021 it was revealed that the commission had asked for three emergency funding top-ups totalling $20 million. Internal Affairs Minister Jan Tinetti, who is the minister responsible for the inquiry, said it was not poor financial management but a learning curve on how big the work would be.

In 2026, a Facebook group was established expressing the lived experience of 5 late diagnosed AuDHD women from state care abuse survivor circles with generational state care in their families because the commission didn't identify the link between undiagnosed disability in parents and child removal because it is still happening in New Zealand. NeuroReverse Facebook Group

== Legacy ==
On 31 December 2024, 16 people were recognised by 2025 New Year Honours for their work in supporting survivors of abuse in care. Nine individuals Rūpene Paul Amato, James William Goodwin, Tristram Richard Ingham, Leoni Frances McInroe, Paora Crawford Moyle, Moeapulu Frances Eileen Tagaloa, Keith Vernon Wiffin, Gary Michael Williams and Paul Andrew Zentveld were made Companions of the King's Service Order while seven individuals Kathleen Patricia Coster, Hans-Josef Erwin Freller, Neta Bernadette Gilbert (Neta Kerepeti), Toni Lee James Jarvis, Michael Joseph Ledingham, (Note: Ledingham relinquished his award of the King's Service Medal in June 2025, and the King directed that the award be cancelled and annulled, and that Ledingham's name be erased from the Register of the King’s Service Order.) Eugene Shane Te Awamate Ryder and Darryl William Smith received King's Service Medals for their work.
