= Lake Alice, Manawatū-Whanganui =

Lake Alice
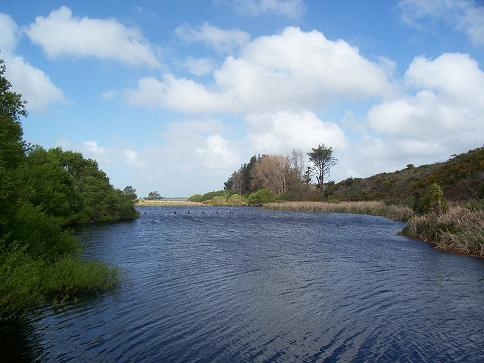
- View of Lake Alice, the locality's namesake
- Interactive map of Lake Alice
- Coordinates: 40°07′32″S 175°20′12″E
- Country: New Zealand
- Region: Manawatū-Whanganui
- District: Rangitikei District
- Wards: Southern General Ward; Tiikeitia ki Tai (Coastal) Māori Ward
- Named for: Lake Alice
- Electorates: Rangitīkei; Te Tai Hauāuru (Māori)

Government
  - Territorial Authority: Rangitikei District Council
  - Regional council: Horizons Regional Council
  - Mayor of Rangitikei: Andy Watson
  - Rangitīkei MP: Suze Redmayne
  - Te Tai Hauāuru MP: Debbie Ngarewa-Packer

Area
  - Total: 25.13 km^{2} (9.70 sq mi)

Population (2023 Census)
  - Total: 138
  - Density: 5.49/km^{2} (14.2/sq mi)

Lake Alice is a locality in the southwestern part of Rangitikei District of the Manawatū-Whanganui region of New Zealand's North Island.

Before the 2018 census, the Lake Alice area unit was a much larger region surrounding Marton and extending southeast to the coast.

== History ==
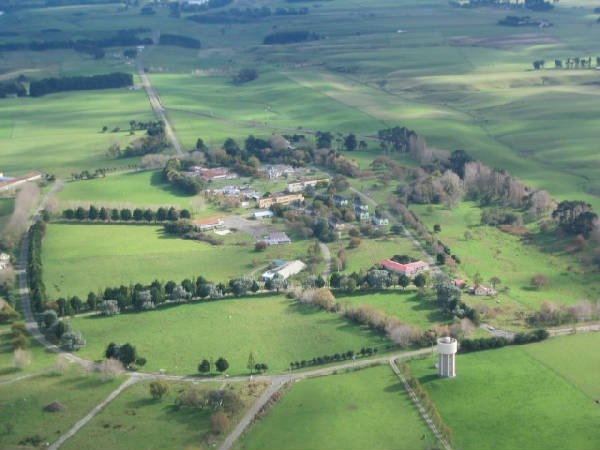
Aerial view of Lake Alice Hospital.

Lake Alice used to be serviced by Lake Alice Hospital, a self-sufficient rural psychiatric facility. Former patients of the hospital's child and adolescent unit made allegations of abuse during the 1970s, including the use of electroconvulsive therapy and paraldehyde injections as punishment. The New Zealand government issued a written apology in 2001, and paid out a total of NZ$10.7 million in compensation to 183 former patients. The former head of the unit gave up the practice of medicine in 2006 in order to forestall a disciplinary hearing by the Medical Practitioners Board of Victoria. The facility ran between August 1950 and October 1999.

== Geography ==
The Lake Alice locality is northeast of Bulls and south of State Highway 3.

Lake Alice's namesake is Lake Alice, an 11 hectare lake, located just southeast of the centre of the Lake Alice area unit.

== Demographics ==
Lake Alice locality covers 25.13 km^{2} (9.70 sq mi). It is part of the larger Parewanui statistical area.

Historical population
Year	Pop.	±% p.a.
2006	153	—
2013	162	+0.82%
2018	132	−4.01%
2023	138	+0.89%

Lake Alice had a population of 138 in the 2023 New Zealand census, an increase of 6 people (4.5%) since the 2018 census, and a decrease of 24 people (−14.8%) since the 2013 census. There were 63 males and 75 females in 54 dwellings. 2.2% of people identified as LGBTIQ+. The median age was 43.2 years (compared with 38.1 years nationally). There were 24 people (17.4%) aged under 15 years, 21 (15.2%) aged 15 to 29, 78 (56.5%) aged 30 to 64, and 18 (13.0%) aged 65 or older.

People could identify as more than one ethnicity. The results were 91.3% European (Pākehā), 21.7% Māori, and 4.3% other, which includes people giving their ethnicity as "New Zealander". English was spoken by 95.7%, Māori by 2.2%, and other languages by 2.2%. No language could be spoken by 4.3% (e.g. too young to talk). New Zealand Sign Language was known by 4.3%. The percentage of people born overseas was 10.9, compared with 28.8% nationally.

The sole religious affiliation given was 28.3% Christian. People who answered that they had no religion were 65.2%, and 10.9% of people did not answer the census question.

Of those at least 15 years old, 24 (21.1%) people had a bachelor's or higher degree, 63 (55.3%) had a post-high school certificate or diploma, and 24 (21.1%) people exclusively held high school qualifications. The median income was $49,000, compared with $41,500 nationally. 12 people (10.5%) earned over $100,000 compared to 12.1% nationally. The employment status of those at least 15 was 69 (60.5%) full-time and 21 (18.4%) part-time.

== Transport ==
=== Roads ===
State Highway 1 goes north and southwest from Bulls. It does not pass through Lake Alice locality.

State Highway 3 goes northeast from Bulls. It forms the northern boundary of Lake Alice.
