= Lake Alice (Wyoming) =

Lake in Wyoming, United States

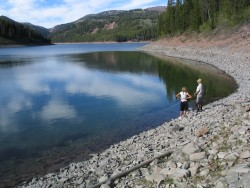
- southern end

- Location within Wyoming Location within the United States
- Location: Lincoln County, Wyoming, United States
- Coordinates: 42°24.7′N 110°44.7′W
- Basin countries: United States
- Max. length: 3 mi (4.8 km)
- Surface area: 230 acres (93 ha)
- Max. depth: 200 ft (61 m)
- Surface elevation: 7,745 ft (2,361 m)

The 3 miles (4.8 km) long, 7,745 feet (2,361 m) elevation, 230-acre (93-hectare), and 200 feet (61 m) max depth Lake Alice is the largest natural lake found in the western portion of the Bridger-Teton National Forest in the state of Wyoming. It is a unique lake that was created thousands of years ago when a massive landslide peeled from the 9,325-foot (2,842 m) Lake Mountain and dammed Poker Creek with debris. The lake's outlet flows below the surface through the natural dam and emerges from the mountain as a creek 1 mile (1.6 km) away. The mountainside scar from the landslide is still visible today. Lake Alice is the home of the only known pure lake strain of naturally reproducing Bonneville cutthroat trout caused by the isolation of the landslide preventing outside genetic influence. At one time the subspecies was thought to be extinct in Wyoming.

The nearest city is Cokeville, Wyoming about 34 miles (55 km) to the southwest. Access to the lake requires traversing a winding 28-mile (45 km) dirt mountain road, and fording a creek with water as deep as 18 inches (0.46 m) in the spring time. A high clearance vehicle is recommended. The road ends at Hobble Creek campground and from there a 1.5-mile (2.4 km) hike up a moderately steep mountain trail is required to reach Lake Alice. Nine primitive tent campsites are available though camping is not restricted to a campsite.

Multiple drownings have occurred at the lake which is named after a young girl who drowned in the early 1900s. The most recent drowning occurred on August 12, 2019. Schuyler McKnight, 22, drowned while canoeing at the lake. His body was recovered 41 days later.
