= Lake Alice Hospital =

Lake Alice Psychiatric Hospital
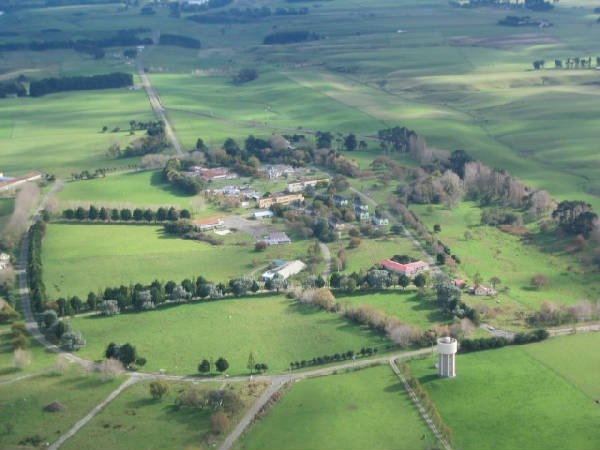
- Aerial view of the hospital estate.

Geography
- Location: Lake Alice, Rangitikei, Manawatū-Whanganui, New Zealand
- Coordinates: 40.1258°S 175.3369°E

Organisation
- Care system: Public
- Type: Psychiatric

Services
- Emergency department: No
- Beds: 960

History
- Founded: August 1950
- Closed: October 1999

Links
- Website: http://www.lakealicehospital.com Unofficial
- Lists: Hospitals in New Zealand

Lake Alice Hospital was a rural psychiatric facility in Lake Alice, Manawatū-Whanganui, New Zealand. It was opened in August 1950, and had a maximum security unit. Like many New Zealand psychiatric hospitals, Lake Alice was largely self-sufficient, with its own farm, workshop, bakery, laundry, and fire station. It also had swimming pools, glasshouses, and vegetable gardens.

The facility slowly shut down during the mid-1990s, finally closing its doors in October 1999.

The buildings and 56-hectare (140-acre) grounds were purchased in July 2006 by Auckland accountant and property developer group Lake Hicks Ltd.

Plans to develop the former psychiatric hospital were scrapped after the owners fell into financial difficulties. The property was sold again in December 2008. The new owners intend to demolish most of the buildings including the infamous maximum security unit. A few buildings such as the administration block will remain and the land will be used for farming.

== Abuse investigation ==
Former patients of the hospital's child and adolescent unit made allegations that abuse took place there during the 1970s, including the use of electroconvulsive therapy without anaesthetic and paraldehyde injections as punishment. The New Zealand government issued a written apology in 2001, and has paid out a total of NZ$10.7 million in compensation to a group of 183 former patients but refused to acknowledge and offer redress for the long term effects of physical, sexual, and psychological abuse and torture. This forced applications to the UN Committee Against Torture (CAT) in 2019. In the Crown's own internal business policy documents it stated it would not recognise long term effects of abuse and would then categorize different forms of abuse and torture in a payment matrix.

The New Zealand Police conducted an investigation dubbed Operation Lake Alice, which included interviews with former staff and 63 former patients. In June 2021, the Royal Commission of Inquiry into Abuse in Care held an 11-day hearing into the practices of psychiatrist Selwyn Leeks and the Adolescent Unit. On 8 June 2021, police announced they would lay charges after finding evidence of criminal wrongdoing. Leeks and one other former staff member, then in their 90s, were deemed unfit to stand trial due to ill health and were not formally charged. Leeks died several months later in January 2022. One other surviving former staff member will face prosecution.

== Redress ==
On 27 May 2024, a former child and adolescent patient of Lake Alice Hospital won a court appeal for ACC to cover injuries suffered during electro-shock therapy during the mid-1970s.

On 30 October 2024, cabinet minister Erica Stanford confirmed that the New Zealand Government would address a parity issue in a $6.5 million compensation settlement that it had reached with 95 Lake Alice survivors in 2001. Survivors received an average of $41,000 in individual payments, with $27,000 being deducted in legal fees for each claimant. Further claimants received an average of $70,000 since the New Zealand Crown covered their legal costs. However, these reimbursements would not be adjusted for inflation.

Stanford announced on 18 December 2024 that the survivors of torture at Lake Alice Hospital would receive a payment of at least $150,000, the government having set aside $22.68 million for the redress scheme. Survivors would be able to opt for an expedited payment of $150,000 or request an individual assessment from an independent arbitrator. The minister said:

"While it is not possible to right or compensate for the wrongs of the past, Cabinet has agreed to recognition to those remaining survivors for the torture they suffered in the care of the State. It also serves as an expression of our regret as to the many ways in which they were failed."

In early May 2025, Lake Alice survivor Malcolm Richards filed a legal challenge at the Wellington High Court seeking a judicial review of the Government's redress framework.

In late November 2025, a government report by independent arbiter Paul Davidson KC suggested that 37 Lake Alice abuse survivors, who chose to have their claims individually assessed, could be awarded $600,000 instead of the $150,000 payout offered by the New Zealand government.

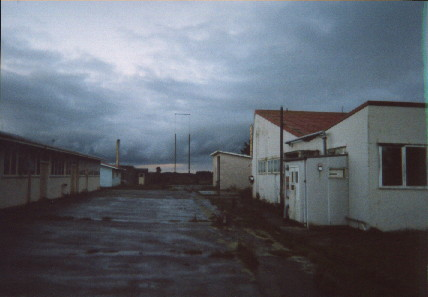
Workshops and maintenance area at dusk (2003)

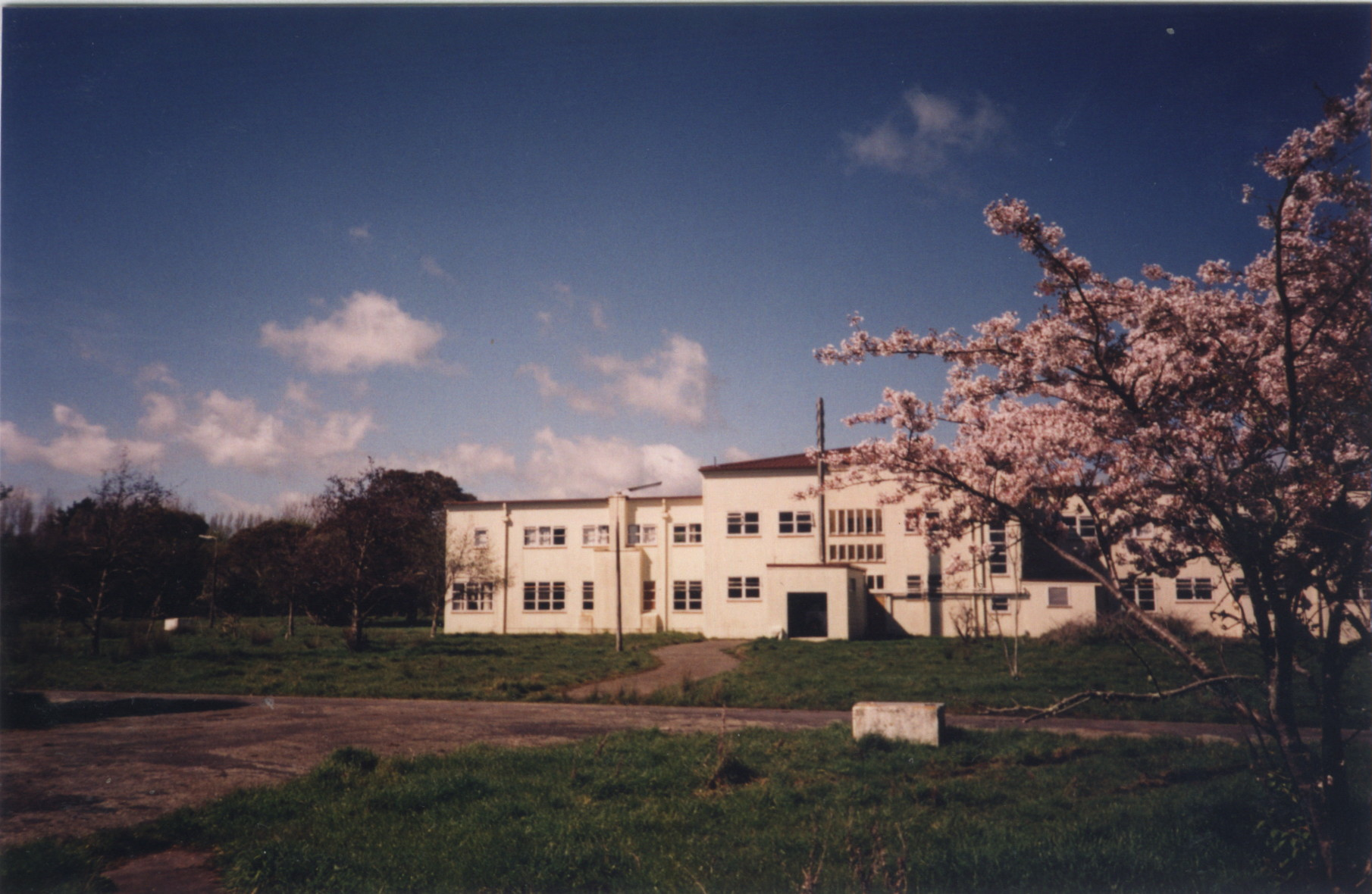
Villa 12 in springtime (2003)
