= Marylands School =

Residential school in Christchurch, New Zealand

Coordinates: 43°33′42.13″S 172°34′8.33″E

Marylands School was a residential school for boys with learning difficulties originally located in Hall's Road, Middleton from 1955, and from 1966 at Nash Road, Halswell, Christchurch, New Zealand. It was run by the Roman Catholic order Brothers Hospitallers of St. John of God. Sexual abuse at the school from the 1970s came to public attention in the 2000s, and survivor testimony was recorded as part of the Royal Commission of Inquiry into Abuse in Care (2018-2023).

== History ==
=== Establishment at Middleton ===
Marylands opened in the former St Joseph's Orphanage on Hall's Road, Middleton in Christchurch in 1955. The two-storied wooden building had formerly been the home of barrister-turned-farmer John Dryden Hall (1865-1941), situated on an 80 acre estate. St Joseph's Orphanage, also known as St Joseph's Boys' Home, run by the Sisters of Nazareth, had opened there, with accommodation for 100 boys, in 1921.

Marylands opened on 21 August 1955 in the presence of 5000 people including Prime Minister Sidney Holland, the mayor of Christchurch, Mr. R. M. McFarlane and several high-ranking members of the Catholic Church. These included the Most Rev. E. M. Joyce (Bishop of Christchurch), Archbishop Liston (Bishop of Auckland), and the Most Rev. P. T. B. McKeefry (Bishop of Wellington). At this occasion, Liston said "Each one of the boys that will come here is a person, with all the rights of a person, and they will come here to be fitted for life." At this time, Marylands was known in the press as a new 'home for retardate boys', and its first head was Brother Killian of the Brothers of St. John of God. Funds were raised for the home through events such as an annual fete in the grounds, as well as concerts by the boys. The Marylands Ladies' Auxiliary, which had branches in Leeston, Ruru and Rangiora, was formed to raise funds for the home.

Reporters from the Christchurch Star newspaper visited Marylands both at Middleton, and later Halswell on several occasions between 1961 - 1984. A collection of their photographs from this period are held by the Christchurch City Libraries. 'Staff featured include Brother Timothy Boxall, Brother Kilian, Brother Raymond Garchow and Brother Roger Moloney. Residents are shown doing activities including fruit picking, cleaning, looking after pets, playing on playground equipment and reading in the library. [The collection] [a]lso includes members of the Marylands Ladies Auxiliary'.

=== Move to Halswell ===
In February 1966 it was announced in the press that the school was to move to premises in Nash Road, Halswell, vacated in the late 1960s by the Sisters of the Good Shepherd, known as the Mount Magdala home, in Halswell Road, which they had occupied since 1886. By this time, 156 boys had been through Marylands. Marylands moved to Mount Magdala on 9 December 1966. Here, more boys could be housed, an increase from 57 to 72, with the goal of 100. The original Middleton site was bought by the Waimari County Council and the original slates on the building were salvaged to restore the Old Stone House in Cashmere.

On 26 October 1972, 'Marylands Special School' was featured in a segment of a BCNZ current affairs television programme called Contact. It featured footage of boys playing sport, building models and reading in a classroom with a teacher. Two staff were interviewed, an un-named priest and Brother Damien Keane, both making the case that if the Government did not increase funding to the home, it may close, as 'the funds from Australia have run out'. As well as showing the driveway, gates and exterior of the home and the adjacent church, the programme contains shots of broken windows, damaged woodwork and crumbling bricks at the home to underline the message. The same year, Brother Damien Keane and some boys were photographed by the Christchurch Star, holding a cheque from a funder.

=== Hogben School ===
The home changed its name in January 1984 to Hogben School when it was taken over by the Ministry of Education as a State special school. The land and school buildings had been owned by the Government since the 1970s when money was given for it to be rebuilt after a fire. 'Allen' and 'Nathan', two former residents of Hogben School, described to the Donald Beasley Institute their experiences there in the 1980s, in a document called 'It Might Be All Houses There Now'. At that time, the school had five residential villas each of which housed up to 24 boys in open dormitories.

=== HRC Te Otu Mātua / Halswell Residential Centre ===
The school is now known as HRC Te Otu Mātua / Halswell Residential Centre, described on its website as 'an intervention for students with intellectual difficulties and complex behaviours'. The cultural narrative of the school acknowledges the painful history of the site, using the metaphor of a river system:

'The St John of God Brothers took over the premises developed by the Sisters of the Good Shepherd and became the next stream in the river system. These waters were not healthy, and several vulnerable young people left this land with painful memories of abuse endured during their time here. Pain leaves a stain on the land. And over the years, other painful eddies have entered our story. The whānau of te Otu Mātua acknowledges the support of several cultural and spiritual leaders from our community who have blessed our land and buildings with cleansing and healing waters at various times throughout our history.'

=== Validation Park ===
In 2023, representatives from the Christchurch City Council met with a small group of Marylands survivors to seek their input into a new name for Marylands Reserve (the initial Middleton site of the home) and nearby Marylands Place, as it was recognised that "[t]he current names serve as a reminder of abuse and hold traumatic associations for survivors. There are limited circumstances where the Council would consider renaming a road, but in this context there is a clear case for change. Renaming Marylands Reserve and Marylands Place acknowledges survivor experiences, the abuse inflicted upon them, and their wishes for change as part of the wider road to puretumu torowhānui / redress." The top three name preferences of the group were Validation, Monarch and MSSAT.

From 6 June 2024, the names of Marylands Reserve and Marylands Place were officially changed to Validation Park and Validation Place. At the unveiling ceremony, survivor Hans Freller said "It's a weight off the shoulders. It's a small step in a long journey and for all of us survivors, as we work towards these little steps, it's extremely important."

== 'The misery of Marylands' ==
On 30 August 2023, Shanti Mathias of The Spinoff published her investigation called 'The Misery of Marylands', as part of the series called The Quarter Million, exploring the survivor testimony provided to the Royal Commission of Inquiry into Abuse in Care. She found that as well as failing to appropriately care for and educate the boys, 'the prolific abuse and secrecy [at Marylands] created a deeply-warped environment, and the boundaries of acceptable behaviour were completely unclear'. Survivor Eddie Marriot lived at Marylands from the age of 5 to fifteen. He said “[f]ear ruled that school...bullying, sexual abuse, staff abuse. If you questioned the staff you got the shit belted out of you.” Ken Clearwater, a survivor advocate who has worked with the Male Survivors of Sexual Abuse Trust (MSSAT) said about Marylands that as well as these traumatic experiences “[a] lot of those kids were told, ‘You’re stupid, you’re worthless, your parents hate you, God hates you, we’re doing you a favour by taking you in’.

== Child Sexual Abuse ==
Staff at the school were involved in 118 sex abuse allegations dating back from the 1970s, with about eighty former students receiving a total payout for compensation of about $5 million.

Survivors told the Royal Commission of Inquiry into Abuse in Care that the Brothers of St John of God, routinely raped, masturbated and indecently assaulted the young children in their care. There were also times when two or more Brothers sexually abused a child at the same time.

In 1984, after the Brothers of St John of God left Marylands, the Bishop of Christchurch invited them to establish a youth ministry to support vulnerable young people. In 1990, the State formally recognised Hebron Trust as an appropriate place to care for young people.

Bernard McGrath, one of the Order's most prolific child rapists was put in charge of operations, despite knowledge of his offending against children as early as 1977.

By 2006, the Australasian branch of the St John of God order had paid out $5.1 million to survivors who had been sexually abused at the school. A nonprofit trust, the Survivors of Sex Abuse Trust, worked with many of the victims. Over 120 complaints were made in regard to sexual and physical abuse alleged to have occurred at the school. Many of the offences were committed in the 1970s.

Of the 37 brothers who ministered in the Christchurch community, 21 had allegations of child sexual abuse made against them.

The head of the Brothers of St John of God, Brother Timothy Graham, said,

I repeat my unreserved apology and that of the Brothers of St John of God to each and every victim of sexual abuse as well as profound sadness for the crimes that took place at Marylands all those years ago.

=== Bernard McGrath ===
Brother Bernard Kevin McGrath received 21 guilty verdicts and pleaded guilty to one charge of sexually abusing boys in 2006. In 2009 TV One screened an episode of Real Crime: Beyond the Darklands in which clinical psychologist Nigel Latta talked to McGrath's victims and evaluated his motivations and likelihood to re-offend. In November 2012, 252 new charges were laid in New South Wales against McGrath alleging that he repeatedly raped, molested and abused dozens of young boys at church-run institutions in the Newcastle-Maitland diocese over several decades. McGrath, then aged 65 years, flew back to Christchurch from Sri Lanka on 29 November 2012 and was arrested on Friday 30 November to face proceedings to extradite him to Australia on the new charges.

In late 2014 he was extradited to Australia and appeared in court on the charges contained in an 8000-page brief.

One accuser, Donald Daniel Ku, would testify before the Commission in February 2022, claiming McGrath sexually abused him in 1963 while he was a student at Marylands School and also put him in a coffin containing a dead body.

Other accusers who were students at Marylands said that McGrath would sexually abuse them, make them look at dead bodies after shoving them into coffins and also physically abuse them with objects such as crucifixes.

=== Brother Roger Maloney ===
In 2008 Brother Roger Maloney, who also worked at Marylands School, was found guilty of seven sex abuse charges and was acquitted of a further 16. After being extradited from Australia, he was jailed for three years for committing sex offences. He unsuccessfully appealed against the length of the sentence. After serving 13 months of a 33-month sentence he was accepted back into the Australian branch of the Order of St John of God.

=== Brother Raymond Garchow ===
Father Raymond John Garchow (1940s? – 3 March 2011) was given a stay of proceedings relating to eight charges over the sexual abuse of boys because he was too ill to stand trial.

=== Brother William Lebler ===
Brother William Lebler was one of three Brothers from St John of God charged with child sex crimes in 2005. Australian Magistrate Hugh Dillon ordered Lebler, Garchow and Maloney to be extradited to New Zealand. Psychologists deemed Lebler "borderline retarded" and therefore was deemed unfit to stand trial. In 2013, Lebler was filmed by the Sydney Morning Herald attended an Alcoholics Anonymous meeting in Sydney CBD.

St John of God has paid compensation to many of Lebler's victims, often demanding the victim signs a Non Disclosure Agreement to ensure their silence

== Royal Commission of Inquiry into Abuse in Care ==
Marylands School along with two other institutions run by the Order of St John of God was subject to the Royal Commission of Inquiry into Abuse in Care, which commenced its investigation in 2018. In August 2023, the Royal Commission published its interim report which focused on the Order of St John's institutions for disabled and vulnerable children including Maryland School. The report documented several cases of depravity, sexual, physical and spiritual abuse at these institutions, with Marylands School and Hebron Trust described as "hell on earth." The three institutions served disabled and vulnerable children and young people. Brother McGrath was identified as a "prolific" abuser at Marylands School.

== See also ==
- Christianity in New Zealand
- Catholic Church sexual abuse cases by country
