= Walkley Documentary Award =

Australian journalism award

The Walkley Documentary Award is an Australian award presented annually since 2011 as part of the Walkley Awards. It recognises excellence in documentary production grounded in journalistic principles.

== List of award winners ==
Order	Year	Recipient(s)	Production company	Program / Title	Broadcaster	Reference
13	2023	Darren Dale, Belinda Mravicic, Jacob Hickey, Allan Clarke	Blackfella Films	The Dark Emu Story	ABC Television	
12	2022	Karl Malakunas		Delikado	Theatrical Release	
11	2021	Wayne Blair, Nel Minchin, Ivan O'Mahoney	In Films	Firestarter:The Story of Bangarra	Theatrical Release	
10	2020	Sarah Ferguson, Nial Fulton, Tony Jones	In Films	Revelation	ABC Television	
9	2019	Stan Grant	Good Thing Productions	The Australian Dream	Theatrical Release	
8	2018	Evan Williams, Eve Lucas, Georgina Davis	SBS Dateline	Myanmar's Killing Fields	SBS Television	
7	2017	Martin Butler, Liz Jackson, Tania Nehme, Bentley Dean	Four Corners	A Sense of Self	ABC Television	
6	2016	Sarah Ferguson, Nial Fulton, Ivan O'Mahoney	In Films	Hitting Home	ABC Television	
5	2015	Michael Ware	Penance Films	Only The Dead	Theatrical Release	
4	2014	Dan Goldberg, Danny Ben-Moshe	Mint Pictures, Identity Films and Productions	Code of Silence	SBS Television	
3	2013	Martin Butler, Bentley Dean	Contact Films	First Footprints	ABC Television	
2	2012	Celeste Geer	Rebel Films	Then the Wind Changed	ABC Television	
1	2011	Darren Dale, Chloe Hooper, Tony Krawitz	Blackfella Films	The Tall Man	Theatrical Release	
