= Nial Fulton =

Australian television producer

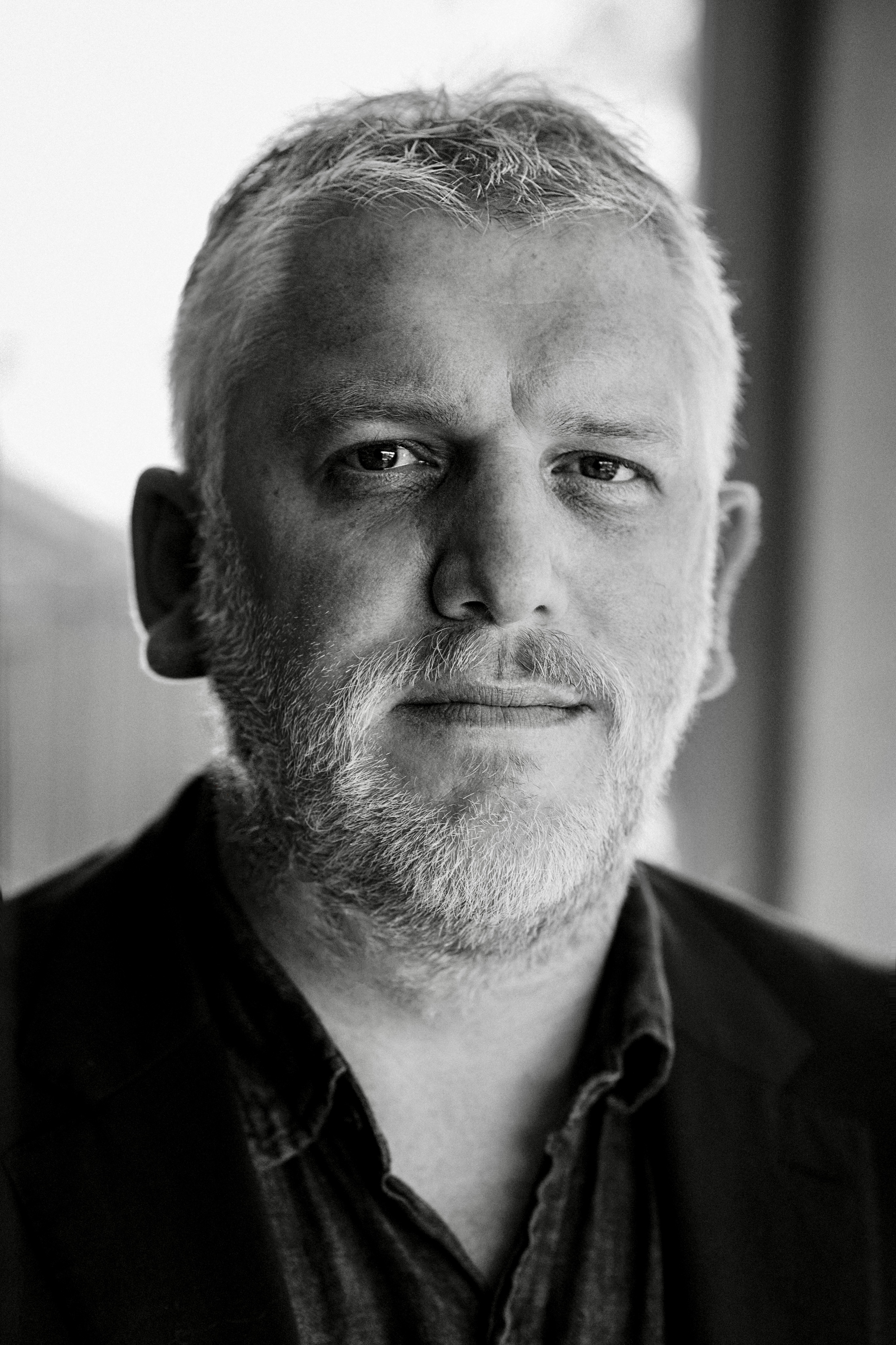
- Born: Nial William Fulton; Enniskillen, County Fermanagh, Northern Ireland
- Education: Portora Royal School, Enniskillen; Queens University, Belfast
- Occupations: Producer; Director; Writer

Nial William Fulton is an Australian film and television director, producer and writer. Focused on social justice issues, his works include investigative documentaries Revelation (Walkley Documentary Award), Hitting Home (AACTA and Walkley Documentary Awards), Borderland, The Queen & Zak Grieve and Firestarter: The Story of Bangarra (Rose d'Or, AACTA and Walkley Documentary Awards).

In 2013 Fulton co-founded Sydney-based independent production company In Films.

== Background ==
Fulton was born in Enniskillen, Northern Ireland, attended Portora Royal School and earned his bachelor's degree from Queen's University, Belfast.

His late father Sandy Fulton, was capped for Northern Ireland in football.

== Career ==
Fulton worked with Screen Ireland and Northern Ireland Screen on co-productions, features and television drama, including King Arthur, Band of Brothers, Freeze Frame, Blind Flight and Reign of Fire.

After moving to Australia in 2004, he developed and produced a slate of productions for domestic and international broadcasters. Between 2010 and 2014 Fulton developed and produced two ABC Television drama specials, both filmed on location in Tasmania.

The Last Confession of Alexander Pearce (2010) starring Adrian Dunbar and Ciaran McMenamin was nominated in the Best Drama category at the Irish Film and Television Awards and the Rose d'Or Awards.

The Outlaw Michael Howe (2014) starring Damon Herriman and Rarriwuy Hick and directed by Brendan Cowell, told the true story of a convict-outlaw who led a rebellion against the British authorities in Van Diemen's Land.

In 2013, Fulton and Ivan O'Mahoney created In Films, an independent production company specialising in social justice documentaries. Their first collaboration was the critically acclaimed Borderland, one of three original series chosen to launch the Al Jazeera America network.

In 2016, the company was nominated for the Screen Producers Australia Breakthrough Business of the Year. Fulton won the Walkley Documentary Award with Sarah Ferguson and Ivan O'Mahoney for their work on the critically acclaimed ABC series Hitting Home.

Between 2018 and 2020, Fulton directed and produced Revelation, a three part series with Sarah Ferguson on clerical abuse in the Catholic Church in Australia. The series took out the Walkley Documentary Award, the second time Fulton and Ferguson have won the award. In 2021, Fulton and Ferguson were nominated by the Australian Directors' Guild for their work on Revelation.

In 2020, Fulton was asked to assist New Zealand's Royal Commission of Inquiry into Abuse in Care and began working closely with investigators. Their work was focused on the Catholic religious institution Brothers Hospitallers of Saint John of God and the sexual abuse of vulnerable children in their institutions in Christchurch. During Revelation, Fulton and his production team interviewed Brother Bernard McGrath, one of the Order's most notorious sex offenders, and provided the Inquiry with evidence the leadership of St John of God had knowingly concealed child sex abuse allegations from police and protected sex offenders within their ranks.

In February 2022, Judge Coral Shaw, Chairwoman of the Royal Commission of Inquiry into Abuse in Care, recognised Fulton's work for the commission, personally thanking him on the final day of public hearings.

== Filmography ==
- Folau (2023) Executive Producer
- Unseen Skies (2022) Executive Producer
- Firestarter: The Story of Bangarra (2021) Executive Producer
- Bangarra's World (2021) Executive Producer
- Dubbo: Life of a Songman (2021) Executive Producer
- Revelation (2020) Director | Producer | Executive Producer
- Making Muriel (2017) Executive Producer
- The Queen & Zak Grieve (2017) Executive Producer
- Matilda & Me (2016) Executive Producer
- Caged (2016) Executive Producer
- Hitting Home (2015) Producer | Executive Producer
- Borderland (2013) Producer | Executive Producer
- The Outlaw Michael Howe (2010) Producer | Executive Producer
- Miracles (2009) Series Producer | Writer
- The Last Confession of Alexander Pearce (2008) Producer | Writer
- Solo (2008) Development Producer
- Miracle on Everest (2007) Producer
- Policing The Pacific (2007) Producer
- The Bridge (2007) Line Producer
- The Choir (2007) Line Producer
- Ten Pound Poms (2007) Producer
- The Catalpa Rescue (2007) Line Producer

== Selected awards ==
- Walkley Documentary Award - 2021, 2020, 2016
- AACTA Awards (Best Documentary) - 2021, 2016
- Rose d'Or Awards (Best Arts Program) - 2021
- Amnesty Awards (Best Television Award) - 2016
- Asian Academy Creative Awards (Best Documentary Series) - 2020
- Kennedy Awards (Most Outstanding Online Film) - 2017
- Screen Producer Australia Awards (Feature Documentary Production of the Year) - 2022
