= Hitting Home =

Hitting Home may refer to:

- Hitting Home (TV series), a 2015 Australian documentary television series presented by Sarah Ferguson that reported on domestic violence in Australia
- Hitting Home (film), also known as Obsessed, a 1987 Canadian drama film based on a novel by Tom Alderman
- "Hitting Home", song by Acoustic Ladyland from the album Skinny Grin
- Hitting Home, a television programme from University of Salford's Channel M
