= Revelation (TV series) =

Australian 2020 documentary series

- Genre: Documentary
- Created by: Nial Fulton; Sarah Ferguson
- Written by: Tony Jones
- Directed by: Nial Fulton; Sarah Ferguson
- Presented by: Sarah Ferguson
- Composer: Helena Czajka
- Country of origin: Australia
- Original language: English
- No. of seasons: 1
- No. of episodes: 3

Production
- Executive producers: Nial Fulton; Ivan O'Mahoney
- Producer: Nial Fulton
- Production locations: Australia, Ireland, United States, New Zealand, Italy
- Cinematography: Aaron Smith; Richard Kendrick; Martin McGrath
- Editors: Lile Judickas; Philippa Rowlands
- Production company: In Films

Original release
- Network: Netflix; Australian Broadcasting Corporation
- Release: 17 March – 2 April 2020

Revelation is a 2020 Australian documentary series directed by Nial Fulton and Sarah Ferguson. The series follows the criminal trials of three Catholic priests accused of child sexual abuse.

The series was produced by In Films for ABC Television and premiered on 17 March 2020, where it received critical acclaim and won the Walkley Documentary Award and Best Documentary Series Award at the Asian Academy Creative Awards.

The series screened on Netflix in March 2023 and spent two weeks in the top 10 most watched TV shows across Australia and New Zealand.

== Synopsis ==
The series examines the forces behind the child sexual abuse scandal in the Catholic Church in Australia and follows the criminal trials of Father Vincent Ryan and Brother Bernard McGrath. The third episode looks at the systemic cover-up of child sexual abuse in the Diocese of Ballarat and features allegations of child sexual abuse against Cardinal George Pell.

== Production ==
The series was shot on location in the Vatican, Ireland, New Zealand and multiple locations around Australia, including the Catholic dioceses of Ballarat and Maitland-Newcastle.

Following lengthy negotiations, the producers were granted permission to bring cameras into the New South Wales District Court to film the 2019 criminal trials of Father Vincent Ryan and Brother Bernard McGrath. Ryan's trial was filmed over six weeks and McGrath's over seven months. It was the first time anywhere in the world that filming of a clerical child abuse trial had been permitted.

NSW Corrective Services granted Fulton and Ferguson permission to interview McGrath, a member of the Hospitaller Order of St. John of God religious order, who was convicted on multiple sex offences against young boys under his care in Kendall Grange, New South Wales. His interview took place inside a maximum-security prison where he is currently serving a 39-year sentence.

== Release ==
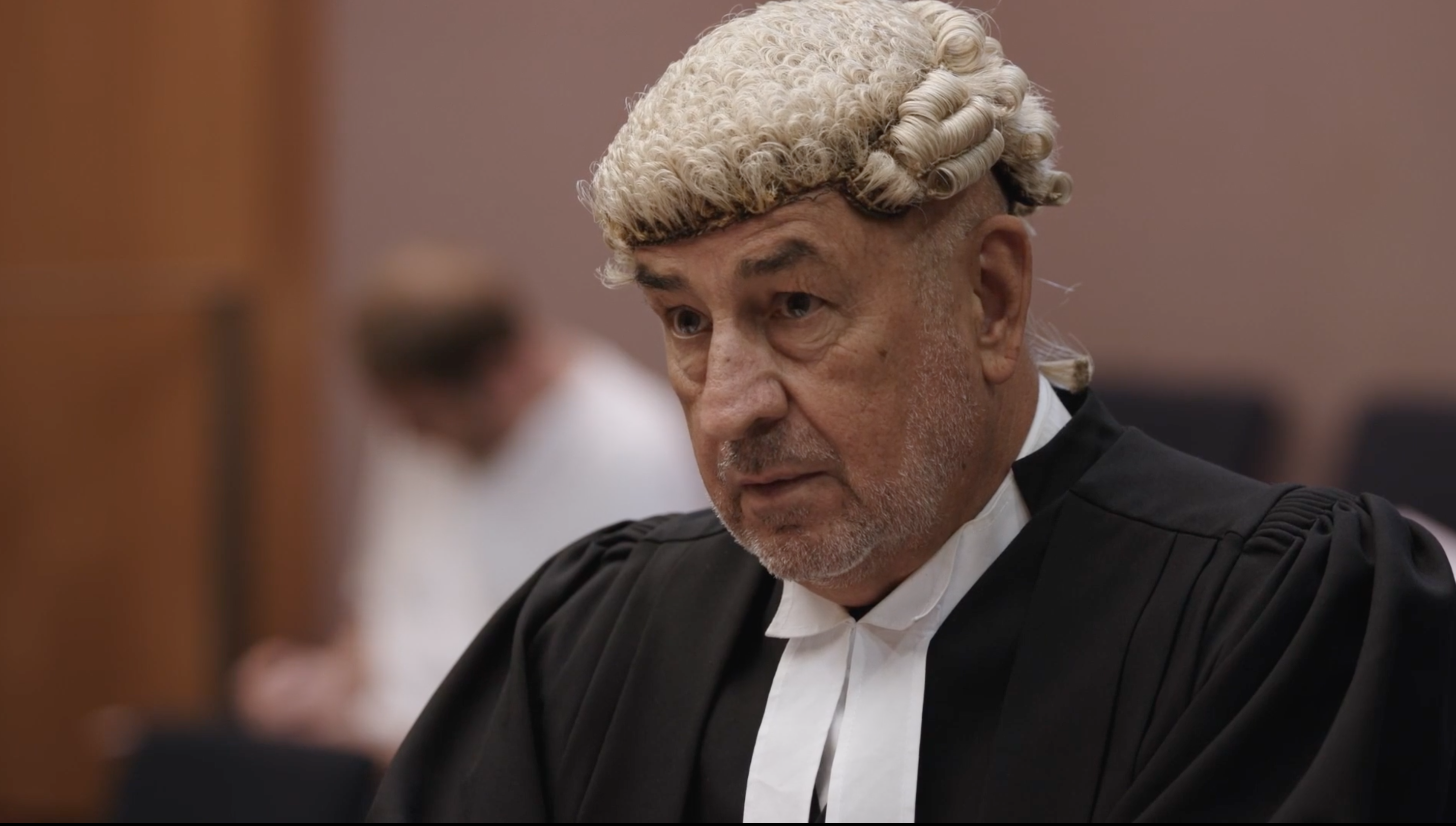
Crown Prosecutor David Patch, New South Wales District Court, 2019

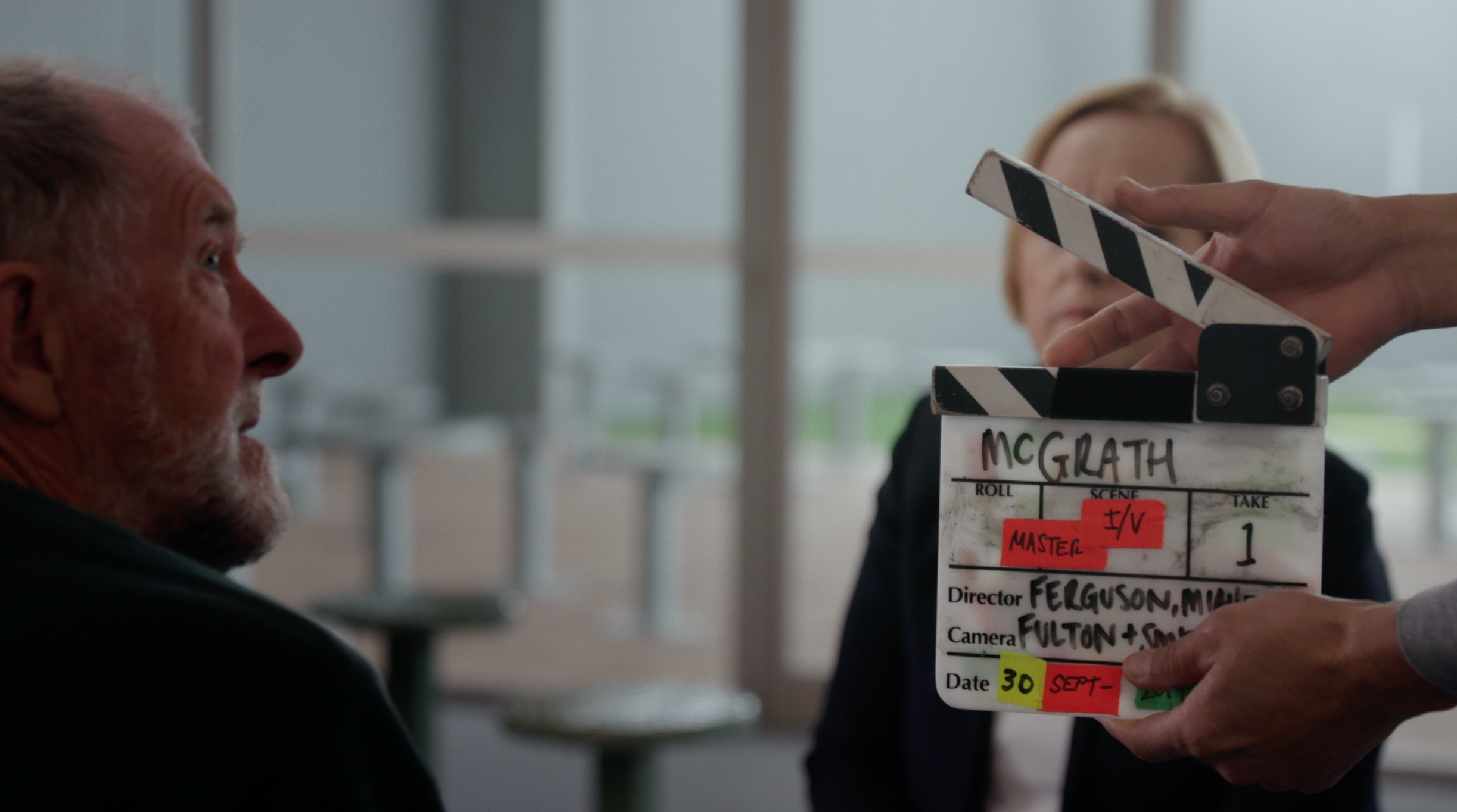
Bernard McGrath interviewed by Sarah Ferguson inside a maximum security prison, New South Wales, 2019

The series premiered on ABC Television on 17 March 2020. Episode 1 achieved a combined (broadcast and online) audience of 885K and an iView audience of 979,000.

Episode 2 was postponed due to live coverage of the prime minister's televised address to the nation regarding the COVID-19 pandemic and went to air on 31 March. It achieved a combined audience of 904,000.

Episode 3 screened on 2 April and achieved a combined audience of 714,000.

The series streamed on Netflix from 22 March 2023 and spent two weeks in the Top Ten most watched TV shows across Australia and New Zealand.

== Key people ==
- Father Vincent Ryan - Roman Catholic Diocese of Maitland-Newcastle
- Brother Bernard McGrath - Hospitaller Order of St. John of God
- Cardinal George Pell - Catholic priest, Roman Catholic Diocese of Ballarat
- Father Bill Burston - Roman Catholic Diocese of Maitland-Newcastle
- Troy Grant - former police officer
- Bishop William Wright - Roman Catholic Diocese of Maitland-Newcastle
- Mary McAleese - former President of Ireland
- Audrey Nash - former friend of Vincent Ryan, mother of Andrew Nash
- Bishop Leo Clarke - Roman Catholic Diocese of Maitland-Newcastle
- Monsignor Patrick Cotter - Roman Catholic Diocese of Maitland-Newcastle
- Father Brian Lucas - Catholic priest
- Father Maurice Cahill - Roman Catholic Diocese of Maitland-Newcastle
- Archbishop Diarmuid Martin - Archbishop of Dublin
- Joanne McCarthy - journalist
- William Melican - Roman Catholic Diocese of Ballarat
- Father Eric Bryant - Roman Catholic Diocese of Ballarat
- Archbishop Charles Scicluna - Archbishop of Malta
- Archbishop Mark Coleridge - Archbishop of Brisbane
- David Marr - journalist
- Steve Bannon - political strategist

== Episodes ==
| No. | Title | Directed by | Written by | Original release date | Length (minutes) |
|---|---|---|---|---|---|
| 1 | "The Children Have Been Used by the Devil" | Nial Fulton; Sarah Ferguson | Sarah Ferguson; Tony Jones | 17 March 2020 | 87 |
| 2 | "A Dangerous Place To Be A Child" | Nial Fulton; Sarah Ferguson | Tony Jones | 29 March 2020 | 90 |
| 3 | "Goliath" | Nial Fulton; Sarah Ferguson | Tony Jones | 2 April 2020 | 102 |

== Reception ==
=== Initial reception ===
The series met with positive reviews. Holly Byrnes of The Daily Telegraph (Sydney) wrote "Walkley award-winning journalist Sarah Ferguson has delivered some of the best TV journalism this country has ever witnessed, but Revelation might just be the pinnacle."

Bridget McManus from The Age (Melbourne) gave it four stars, calling it a "searing documentary series".

Brigid Delaney, a senior writer for Guardian Australia, wrote: "You'll need a strong stomach to digest Revelation's insights into child sexual abuse in the Catholic church."

In The Australian, Graeme Blundell wrote that "although it is often difficult to watch, Ferguson and her exemplary production team, including executive producer Nial Fulton, principal cinematographer Aaron Smith and researchers Sophie Randerson, Kate Wild, and Alison McClymont, have been able to shed light not only on their heinous atrocities but how the Catholic Church repeatedly chose secrecy over transparency and accountability. It is a confronting, awful study of a church that not only fell to decay but seems beyond renewal, achingly absent of integrity and grace."

Blundell also praised Sarah Ferguson for her restraint, saying that "the interviews she conducts, initially with Ryan and later with Bernard McGrath, a former St John of God brother, teacher and headmaster in residential schools in Australia and New Zealand, serving 39 years for crimes against children, are harrowing and disturbing as she provokes and exposes a web of conspiracy and perversion. She tries to display no explicit emotion as she questions Ryan but can only just conceal her ethical disgust behind that journalistic veneer of taut self-control."

The series won the Walkley Documentary Award on 20 November 2020. The judges' citation read: "This haunting documentary broke new ground on an issue already well covered by the media and investigated by police and the Royal Commission alike. The extraordinary access to some of the Catholic Church's most notorious perpetrators of sexual abuse against children, as well as the insight it gave viewers into court proceedings, showed just how powerful journalistic documentary-making can be."

=== Controversy ===
On 7 April 2020, Cardinal George Pell was released from Barwon Prison and had his convictions for child sexual abuse overturned. In response, the producers took the decision to include footage of Pell's release. No material from the original broadcast was removed or altered.

In a statement, Cardinal Pell rejected the allegations made by Bernie and Peter Clarke in Revelation, but following his acquittal did not sue the producers or ABC Television. Pell's release paved the way for the Royal Commission into Institutional Responses to Child Sexual Abuse to release their previously redacted findings into what Pell knew about child sexual abuse in Victoria.

Andrew Bolt, a News Corp columnist and outspoken supporter of Pell, attacked the filmmakers, saying that the series was part of a "witch-hunt" against Pell. Following his acquittal, other vocal supporters of Pell, including Miranda Devine and Gerard Henderson, condemned those who had reported on the story. Other News Corp journalists also called the ABC's reporting on the Pell case one-sided and biased.

Greg Craven, vice-chancellor of the Australian Catholic University and long-time friend of Pell, accused the ABC and police of "polluting" the legal atmosphere around the cardinal's Victorian trial.

The ABC rejected Craven's allegations that they had intentionally brought forward Episode 3 of Revelation in an attempt to influence the High Court. In response to News Corp, the ABC stated it had "always acted in the public interest" and rejected allegations of "a 'witch hunt' against Cardinal Pell" or "that it engaged in 'vigilante' journalism or that its coverage was one-sided or unfair". Journalist Margaret Simons said the ABC's reporting on Pell did not "step over the line".

== Response from the Catholic Church ==
=== Diocese of Maitland-Newcastle ===
==== Father Vincent Ryan ====
The Diocese of Maitland-Newcastle responded to the imminent release of the series by issuing an open letter to their parishioners attempting to justify their failure to laicise convicted paedophile priest Father Vincent Ryan. This was followed by a second press release, including a timeline of Ryan's offending and Bishop Leo Clarke's failure to respond to Ryan's abuse.

The letter also stated that the Congregation of the Doctrine of the Faith would recommend to Pope Francis that Ryan be laicised.

Ryan died on 30 May 2022. Despite knowledge of Ryan's offending, the Catholic Church did not laicise him.

==== Bishop Leo Clarke ====
During his interview, Sarah Ferguson asked Bishop Wright why the church continued to celebrate the life of Bishop Leo Clarke, a man the church acknowledged had protected Vincent Ryan and concealed his sexual abuse of children. Following broadcast, a plaque celebrating Clarke was removed from Maitland cathedral.

==== Father Bill Burston ====
Wright's press release also referenced the treatment of the Nash family and the remarks made by Father William Burston. The report concluded Andrew Nash "tragically committed suicide" after he was "abused by the criminal William Cable 'Br Romuald'". An internal Catholic investigation was launched by Bishop William Wright regarding Burston's interview, where he told Sarah Ferguson that he thought the suicide of 13-year-old Andrew Nash in 1974 was a "prank gone wrong".

Wright confirmed the internal investigation concluded "some time ago" and Burston voluntarily agreed to no longer celebrate Mass or other church rituals. Audrey Nash had not been notified about the outcome of the investigation.

The Royal Commission Case Study 43 was released in October 2020 and found Burston knew there had been a complaint of "sexually inappropriate behaviour" against Ryan in 1976. The Nash family told The Newcastle Herald they wanted Burston laicised for his remarks.

==== Diocese of Ballarat ====
The Bishop of Ballarat, Paul Bird, issued a press release on 17 March 2020 warning parishioners they might find some of the material in Revelation confronting and painful. Following the release of the series, Bird removed Father Bryant from his parish and forced him into early retirement.

==== Brothers of St John of God ====
On 7 April 2020, the Hospitaller Order of the Brothers of St John of God posted a statement about the series on their website. The order did not deny they had prior knowledge of Bernard McGrath's sexual offending against children under his care and moved him from Australia to New Zealand and later to the Jemez Springs treatment facility run by the Congregation of the Servants of the Paraclete in New Mexico, United States.

New Zealand's Royal Commission of Inquiry into Abuse in Care examined the crimes of the St John of God order in Christchurch and used some material from Revelation during their public hearings. Judge Coral Shaw, chair of the commission, publicly thanked Nial Fulton and Sarah Ferguson for their work.

==== Archdiocese of Sydney ====
On 2 April 2020, the Archdiocese of Sydney responded to the allegations raised against Cardinal George Pell in episode 3 of the series by issuing a short press release.

== Accolades ==
Awards and nominations
| Award | Date of ceremony | Category | Recipient(s) | Result | Ref. |
| Screen Producers Australia Awards | March 2021 | Best Documentary Series | Sarah Ferguson, Nial Fulton, Tony Jones | Nominated | |
| Australian Directors Guild Awards | December 2021 | Best Direction in a Documentary Series | Nial Fulton, Sarah Ferguson | Nominated | |
| Walkley Awards | 2020 | Walkley Documentary Award | Sarah Ferguson, Nial Fulton, Tony Jones | Won | |
| Walkley Awards | 2020 | Television Camerawork (Episode 3) | Aaron Smith | Nominated | |
| Asian Academy Creative Awards | December 2020 | Best Documentary Series | Sarah Ferguson, Nial Fulton, Tony Jones | Won | |
| Asian Academy Creative Awards | November 2020 | Best Documentary Series (National Winner) | Sarah Ferguson, Nial Fulton, Tony Jones | Won | |
| Australian Cinematographers Society Awards | November 2020 | Gold Award (Episode 3) | Aaron Smith | Won | |
| Australian Screen Editors | November 2020 | Best Editing in a Documentary (Episode 3) | Philippa Rowlands | Won | |
| Florence Film Awards | November 2020 | Best Editing | Philippa Rowlands | Won | |
| Florence Film Awards | November 2020 | Best Original Score | Helena Czajka | Won | |
| Spotlight Documentary Film Awards | January 2021 | Gold Award | Sarah Ferguson, Nial Fulton, Tony Jones | Won | |
| Australian Academy of Cinema and Television Arts Awards | November 2020 | Best Editing in a Documentary (Episode 3) | Philippa Rowlands | Nominated | |
| Australian Academy of Cinema and Television Arts Awards | November 2020 | Best Cinematography in a Documentary (Episode 1) | Aaron Smith, Andy Taylor, Martin McGrath | Nominated | |
| Banff World Media Festival | June 2021 | Social Issues and Current Affairs | Sarah Ferguson, Nial Fulton, Tony Jones | Nominated | |
| Australian International Documentary Conference Awards | March 2021 | Best Documentary Series | Sarah Ferguson, Nial Fulton, Tony Jones | Nominated | |

== See also ==
- Catholic sex abuse cases
- Mea Maxima Culpa: Silence in the House of God
- Spotlight (film)
- Deliver Us from Evil (2006 film)
- Holy Water-Gate
- Twist of Faith
