= Van Diemen's Land (film) =

- Directed by: Jonathan auf der Heide
- Written by: Jonathan auf der Heide; Oscar Redding
- Produced by: Maggie Miles
- Starring: Oscar Redding; Greg Stone
- Cinematography: Ellery Ryan
- Edited by: Cindy Clarkson
- Music by: Jethro Woodward
- Production companies: Noise & Light, Savage Films, Inspiration Studios
- Distributed by: Madman Entertainment, Bavaria Media International
- Release date: 24 September 2009
- Running time: 104 minutes
- Country: Australia
- Languages: English; Irish
- Box office: $289,858

Van Diemen's Land is a 2009 Australian gothic thriller, directed by Jonathan auf der Heide. Set in 1822 in colonial Tasmania it follows the story of the infamous Irish convict, Alexander Pearce, played by Oscar Redding and narrates the events of his escape from Sarah Island with seven other convicts. The voice-over and some of the dialogue is in Irish.

== Plot ==
The film takes place in 1822 in Tasmania and is inspired by a true story. A group of transported convicts, suffering brutal treatment at the Macquarie Harbour penal settlement on Van Diemens Land, as Tasmania was known until 1856, escape into the wilderness in hopes of reaching the settled districts to the east. Their enthusiasm and bravado soon give way to hunger, which saps their strength and causes them to despair. Former urban dwellers, the English, Irish and Scottish convicts realise that not only are they lost, but they do not know how to hunt or fish. Hunger and despair forces the group to switch to survival-cannibalism, and the group is ripped apart by this barbaric act. Two of the group separate and walk to their imminent death, with no food and days upon days of walking ahead of them. The remaining men do all in their power to keep moving, watch their back and avoid sleep, lest they be the next sacrifice.

=== Convicts ===
- Alexander Pearce – Aged 32, Irish, thief
- Robert Greenhill – 32, English, sailor
- Matthew Travers – 27, Irish, farmer
- Alexander Dalton – 25, Irish, ex-soldier
- John Mather – 24, Scottish, bread baker
- Thomas Bodenham – 22, English, thief
- William Kennerly – 44, Irish, thief
- Edward 'Little' Brown – 48, English, profession unknown

== Cast ==
- Oscar Redding as Alexander Pearce
- Arthur Angel as Robert Greenhill
- Paul Ashcroft as Matthew Travers
- Mark Leonard Winter as Alexander Dalton
- Torquil Neilson as John Mather
- Thomas Wright as Thomas Bodenham
- Greg Stone as William Kennerly
- John Francis Howard as Edward 'Little' Brown

== Production Companies ==
Filmed in 2008, Van Diemen's Land is an extension of the short film Hell's Gates, directed by Jonathan auf der Heide and produced by Maggie Miles, starring Oscar Redding, when the three met at the Victorian College of the Arts, School of Film and Television. Jonathan and Oscar's production company Noise & Light is the credited entity with Maggie Miles producing through her company Savage Films and Inspiration Studios providing production and post-production support. This was a low-budget ensemble production.

== Release and reception ==
Van Diemen's Land was released in Australian cinemas on 24 September 2009, and was rated MA15+ for "strong violence and coarse language". It received mostly positive reviews, and earned an 80% approval rating on Rotten Tomatoes based on 10 reviews with an average 6.6/10 rating. During the opening weekend, the film grossed $39,939 at the 9 theatres it played ($4,438 average). The film won 3 awards in 2009: Sitges - Catalonian International Film Festival (New Visions Award - Special Mention), Lund International Film Festival, Best Non-European Feature, and Torino Film Festival award for Best Script - Special Mention.

== Box office ==
Van Diemen's Land grossed $289,858 at the box office in Australia.

== See also ==
- Cinema of Australia
- Dying Breed
- The Last Confession of Alexander Pearce
- Tasmanian Gothic
