= The Last Confession of Alexander Pearce =

- Promotional poster for The Last Confession of Alexander Pearce
- Directed by: Michael James Rowland
- Written by: Michael James Rowland; Nial Fulton
- Produced by: Nial Fulton
- Starring: Adrian Dunbar; Ciarán McMenamin; Dan Wyllie; Don Hany; Chris Haywood; Bob Franklin
- Cinematography: Martin McGrath
- Edited by: Suresh Ayyar
- Music by: Roger Mason
- Distributed by: Hopscotch Films
- Release date: 29 December 2008 (Ireland)
- Running time: 60 minutes
- Countries: Australia; Ireland
- Language: English

The Last Confession of Alexander Pearce, also titled Last Confessions of The Cannibal: The Strange Story of Alexander Pearce, is a 2008 Australian-Irish film directed by Michael James Rowland starring Irish actors Adrian Dunbar as Father Philip Conolly and Ciarán McMenamin as bushranger Alexander Pearce. The film was shot on location in Tasmania and Sydney. It was nominated for several awards, winning several, including Best Television Movie in the Inside Film Awards. Director Michael James Rowland was nominated in the Best Director (Telemovie) category in the 2009 Australian Directors' Guild Awards.

== Plot ==
The film follows the final days of Irish convict and bushranger Alexander Pearce's life as he awaits execution. In 1824, the British penal colony of Van Diemen's Land is little more than a living hell. Chained to a wall in the darkness of a cell under Hobart Gaol, Pearce is visited by Father Philip Conolly, the only Catholic priest in the fledgling colony and a fellow Irishman. Pearce wishes to relate to the priest the horrors he endured in the three months spent traversing the wilderness of Van Diemen's Land. Conolly struggles to reconcile his desire to grant absolution to the convict with the story Pearce tells him. The title of the film comes from the interaction between Conolly and Pearce in the days before Pearce is executed. The Last Confession of Alexander Pearce is presented as a psychoanalytical historical epic.

The underscored aspect of Pearce's crime and confessions is the murder of fellow escapees and his alleged cannibalism.

The film details the convict's relinquishing psyche as he finds himself succumbing to the inevitability of his imminent execution. The circumstances and motives of Pearce's execution are put into question by Rowland.

== Production ==
Producer and co-writer Nial Fulton began developing The Last Confession of Alexander Pearce in Ireland in 1998 and production began on the project in Australia in the summer of 2006. The film was commissioned and financed by the Australian Broadcasting Corporation, RTÉ, BBC Northern Ireland, Screen Australia and Screen Tasmania.

The Last Confession of Alexander Pearce was inspired by the true story of an escape from the infamous Sarah Island penal settlement in Macquarie Harbour, Van Diemen's Land in 1822 by Irish convict and bushranger Alexander Pearce and the subsequent confession he made to the Hobart priest Phillip Conolly days before he was executed for the murder of fellow convict Thomas Cox.

Rotten Tomatoes cites the film's alternative title as Last Confessions of The Cannibal: The Strange Story of Alexander Pearce.

=== Script ===
Written by Michael James Rowland and Nial Fulton, the script draws on all four confessions made by Alexander Pearce, but principally on the confessions he made to Commandant John Cuthbertson and the final confession made to the priest Phillip Conolly. In many places the script uses the exact words written down in these confessions.

=== Principal cast ===
- Adrian Dunbar as Philip Conolly
- Ciarán McMenamin as Alexander Pearce
- Dan Wyllie as Robert Greenhill
- Don Hany as John Mather
- Bob Franklin as Matthew Travers
- Chris Haywood as Reverend Robert Knopwood
- Richard Green as Edward Brown

== Van Diemen's Land / Tasmania ==
Shot over five weeks on location in Tasmania and Sydney in 2008, the film used locations around Derwent Bridge, Lake St Clair, Nelson Falls, the Huon Valley, Mount Wellington and Callan Park, a former asylum in Rozelle. Many of the filming locations were selected as they were places Alexander Pearce may have passed through on his escape from Sarah Island.

== Critical response and reviews ==
The Last Confession of Alexander Pearce received positive reviews internationally from film critics. The Sydney Morning Herald gave the film 4/5 stars.

== Accolades ==
The film was nominated for the 2010 Rose d'Or, Best Drama at the 2009 Australian Film Institute Awards, won Best Documentary at the 2009 Inside Film Awards and the director Michael James Rowland was nominated in the Best Director (Telemovie) category in the 2009 Australian Directors Guild Awards.

Accolades received by The Last Confession of Alexander Pearce
Award	Date of ceremony	Category	Recipient(s)	Result	Ref.
Rose d'Or	May 5, 2010	Best Drama	Nial Fulton	Nominated	
Irish Film and Television Awards	February 14, 2009	Single Drama	Nial Fulton	Nominated	
Australian Film Industry Awards	December 5, 2009	Best Television Feature	Nial Fulton	Nominated	
Australian Directors Guild Awards	September 10, 2009	Best Direction in a Television Feature	Michael James Rowland	Nominated	
Inside Film Awards	November 19, 2009	Best Documentary	Nial Fulton, Michael James Rowland	Won	
APRA Screen Music Awards	June 23, 2009	Best Music for a Mini-Series or Telemovie	Roger Mason	Won	
APRA Screen Music Awards	June 23, 2009	Best Soundtrack Album	Roger Mason	Nominated	
ÉCU The European Independent Film Festival	March 12-14, 2010	Best Non-European Feature	Nial Fulton	Won	
Crossroads Film Festival	April 2-5, 2009	Best Feature	Nial Fulton	Won	
Newport International Film Festival	2009	Special Jury Prize	Nial Fulton	Won	
Rome International Film Festival	2009	Special Jury Prize	Nial Fulton	Won	
Trégor Film Festival	2009	Best Film (Under 60 mins)	Nial Fulton	Won	
Trégor Film Festival	2009	Best Actor	Adrian Dunbar	Nominated	
Trégor Film Festival	2009	Best Director	Michael James Rowland	Nominated	
Trégor Film Festival	2009	Best Screenplay	Nial Fulton, Michael James Rowland	Nominated	
Austin Film Festival	2009	Best Actor	Adrian Dunbar]	Nominated	
Cape Town International Film Festival	2009	Best Feature	Nial Fulton	Won	
Crystal Palace International Film Festival	2009	Best Feature	Nial Fulton	Won	

== See also ==
- Cinema of Australia
- Macquarie Harbour Penal Station
- Van Diemen's Land
- Tasmanian Gothic
- Alexander Pearce
- County Monaghan
