= Michael James Rowland =

Australian film director (born 1964)

Michael James Rowland (born 1964) is an Australian graphic designer, writer and film director. As a designer, he was art director with the Adelaide Festival of Arts from 1987 to 1994. He wrote a series of graphic novellas in the 1990s while studying filmmaking and making short films. He became known for his debut feature film, Lucky Miles (2007), which he directed and co-wrote.

== Early years ==
Michael James Rowland was born in 1964. He studied graphic design at the North Adelaide School of Arts in Adelaide, South Australia.

== Career ==
=== Graphic design ===
Rowland started his early working life as a designer and illustrator specialising in the arts. He was art director with the Adelaide Festival of Arts from 1987 until 1994.

=== Publishing ===
Rowland established the graphic novella imprint Cowboy Books, publishing titles such as Ten Drawings of the Jungle, The Existentialist Cowboys Last Stand and Life Advice for High-Plains Drifters in the 1990s.

=== Filmmaking ===
In 1994, Rowland relocated to Sydney to study at the Australian Film, Television and Radio School (AFTRS), graduating in 1997. While a student there, he wrote the short films The Existentialist Cowboy's Last Stand (1995) and Flying Over Mother (1996). Flying Over Mother was screened at international film festivals and met with acclaim.

Rowland has written and directed short films, documentaries and commercials. He made a short film adaptation of one of his graphic novellas, The Existentialist Cowboys Last Stand, in 1995.

Rowland's first feature film as director, Lucky Miles (2007), was co-written with Helen Barnes. The film was chosen to be the opening night film of the 2007 Adelaide Film Festival, and had its international premiere at the Karlovy Vary International Film Festival, where it won the special jury prize. In 2008 it was programmed by ABC1 at 8:30 pm on a Sunday during the Australia Day long-weekend holiday.

In 2008, Rowland co-wrote and directed the one-hour ABC, RTÉ and BBC drama The Last Confession of Alexander Pearce. Set in 1824 Van Diemen's Land, The Last Confession of Alexander Pearce tells the true story of an escape from the notorious British prison Sarah Island by eight convicts. It was co-written and produced by Nial Fulton. For his work, Rowland was nominated in the Best Telemovie Director category at the 2009 Australian Directors Guild Awards.

During 2010 and 2011, Rowland directed eight episodes of the series My Place, produced by Penny Chapman.

In 2011 he directed several episodes of Series 2 of the ballet teen-drama Dance Academy, produced by Werner Film Productions for ABC, and in the second half of the year directed episodes 3, 4 and 5 of the award-winning Foxtel drama Tangle.

== Recognition and awards ==
Rowland won the Master's Chair award from the Adelaide Advertising & Design Club in 1992 for his work in advertising "Something On Saturday" for the CTR Trust at the Adelaide Festival.

The Existentialist Cowboy's Last Stand won a Silver Hugo at the Chicago Film Festival. Flying Over Mother earned a nomination at the 1997 Australian Film Institute Awards in the Animal Logic Award for Best Short Fiction Film.

In 2007, Lucky Miles won the Special Jury Prize at the Karlovy Vary International Film Festival and the audience award for Best Film at the 2007 Sydney Film Festival. Rowland and Helen Barnes were nominated for Best Screenplay at the Asia Pacific Screen Awards for the film.

The Last Confession of Alexander Pearce drew TV industry nominations and wins in various award categories in both Europe and Australia. It was nominated for Best Drama at the 2010 Rose D'Or awards in Switzerland, and Best Documentary at the Inside Film Awards. Rowland was a finalist at the ADG Awards for the film.
