= Labor in Power =

1993 Australian documentary TV series

- Genre: Political docuseries
- Written by: Phil Chubb
- Directed by: Sue Spencer
- Narrated by: Kathy Bowlen
- Country of origin: Australia
- Original language: English
- No. of seasons: 1
- No. of episodes: 5

Production
- Executive producer: Paul Williams
- Producer: Sue Spencer
- Running time: 58 minutes

Original release
- Network: ABC TV
- Release: 8 June – 6 July 1993

Labor in Power is a 1993 Australian documentary series about the first ten years of the Hawke-Keating government produced by the Australian Broadcasting Corporation. It was divided into five one-hour episodes and originally broadcast from 8 June to 6 July 1993.

In a decade of profound change, from 1983 to 1993, the ABC Television News and Current Affairs Political Documentary Unit compiled a unique series, capturing the key elements of the Australian Labour Party's ten-year rule. The battle between Bob Hawke and Paul Keating for the Labor Party leadership was one of the most divisive in Australian political history the seeds of which can be traced back as far as 1980. The series is an intensely personal examination of the Hawke-Keating relationship, and through more than 120 interviews with Cabinet Ministers, senior bureaucrats and staff advisers, the series offers an insider's view of who wields power in Australia, and how. The five episodes are; "Taking power", "Taxing times", "Conserving power", "The recession we had to have" and "The sweetest victory".

The documentary was filmed with the interviewees anticipating electoral defeat in the 1993 Australian federal election. The final ten minutes of the last episode document the surprise result that returned the Keating government for a final term. The longest period the century-old Australian Labor Party spent in office was the 13-year Hawke-Keating government.

A long-running thread within the series is the secret Kirribilli Agreement of 1988 and the expectations it created. Episode 1 covers both the 1982 Australian Labor Party leadership spill and the 1983 Australian Labor Party leadership spill which preceded the 1983 federal election in which Labor came to government, and the following 1984 federal election which reduced Labor's majority in parliament. Episode 4 covers the early 1990s recession, and Episode 5 includes events of the Gulf War, reflections on the June 1991 Australian Labor Party leadership spill and the December 1991 Australian Labor Party leadership spill, then the subsequent 1993 federal election.

Although produced before the end of the period in which Labor was in government, producing long-format retrospectives on Australian federal governments would soon become an ironclad ABC tradition. Labor in Power was followed in subsequent decades by The Howard Years, The Killing Season and Nemesis, which have each focused on the whole of the government's time in office, the ABC having learned from Labor in Power not to produce such documentaries until after a government's time in office has ended.

== Awards ==
- 1993 Gold Walkley to Philip Chubb and Sue Spencer
- 1993 Walkley Award Best Application of the Television Medium to Journalism by to Philip Chubb and Sue Spencer
- Logie Awards of 1994, Most Outstanding Documentary

== See also ==
- The Howard Years, covering the subsequent Coalition government from 1996 to 2007
- The Killing Season, covering the Labor government from 2007 to 2013
- Nemesis, covering the Coalition government from 2013 to 2022
