= The Howard Years =

2008 Australian documentary TV series

- Genre: Documentary
- Narrated by: Fran Kelly
- Composer: Guy Gross
- Country of origin: Australia
- Original language: English
- No. of episodes: 4

Production
- Executive producer: Sue Spencer
- Producer: Deborah Masters
- Cinematography: Paul Ree

Original release
- Network: ABC1
- Release: 17 November – 8 December 2008

The Howard Years is a documentary series about the prime ministership of John Howard produced by the Australian Broadcasting Corporation. It was divided into four one-hour episodes – one episode for each term Howard served as Prime Minister of Australia – and was originally broadcast on ABC1 from 17 November to 8 December 2008. The program continued the ABC's contemporary tradition of producing a similar long-form retrospective documentary series of Australian governments – albeit The Howard Years was produced following the end of the Howard government, unlike the previous Labor in Power series.

== Ratings ==
Episode	Name	Producer and Director	Editor	Script	Original air date	Ref
1	Change the Government, Change the Country	Deborah Masters	John Pleffer	Mark Bannerman^{a}	17 November 2008	
2	Whatever It Takes	Ges D'Souza	Lile Judickas	Mark Bannerman^{a}	24 November 2008	
3	Commander-in-Chief	Ges D'Souza	Lile Judickas	Mark Bannerman^{a}	1 December 2008	
4	Walking on Water	Gillian Bradford and Deborah Masters	John Pleffer	Gillian Bradford^{b}	8 December 2008	

=== Notes ===
^a Script editor
^b Writer

== See also ==
- Labor in Power, a series on the first decade of the preceding Labor government from 1983-1996
- The Killing Season, a series on the subsequent Labor government from 2007–2013
- Nemesis, covering the Coalition government from 2013-2022
