= The Queen & Zak Grieve =

- Genre: Documentary television series
- Country of origin: Australia
- Original language: English
- No. of seasons: 1
- No. of episodes: 6

Original release
- Network: The Australian
- Release: 28 August 2017

The Queen & Zak Grieve is a six-part documentary television series produced for The Australian newspaper. The series investigates the story of Zak Grieve, a young indigenous man from Australia's Northern Territory who was sentenced to life imprisonment for his part in a contract killing, for which he wasn't present at the murder scene.

The series was presented by investigative reporter Dan Box and was developed and produced by In Films, in association with The Australian and Screen Australia.

== Synopsis ==
The Queen & Zak Grieve follows journalist Dan Box through the town of Katherine in Australia's Northern Territory as he investigates the killing of Ray Niceforo in 2011 and the events that led to 19-year-old Aboriginal man Zak Grieve being jailed, despite evidence he was not there when the crime took place.

The Northern Territory has had a 20-year non-parole mandatory minimum sentence for murder since 2004. In addition, if an individual fails to stop a murder in the state, that person can also be convicted of murder. The judge who presided over Grieve's case described the conviction as an "injustice".

The series features exclusive interviews with many of the people involved, as well as rare crime scene footage, forensic photographs, police interviews with suspects and trial recordings from the case.

== Aftermath ==
Following the broadcast of the series, the Northern Territory Attorney-General Natasha Fyles agreed to forward a mercy plea application to the Administrator of the Territory. After the Administrator's secretary told Zak Grieve's mother Glenice, that a letter she had written pleading for her son's release had formally triggered the mercy plea process, the NT's Chief Minister, Michael Gunner, described Zak's case as an “anomaly” of “blunt” legislation.

Opposition Leader Gary Higgins, said he would support reforming the Territory's mandatory sentencing laws for murder. The Attorney-General said the royal prerogative of mercy was retained in the Northern Territory and exercised by the Administrator on the advice of the government, handed down by Cabinet.

Zak Grieve was released on Parole October 27th 2023.

=== Key characters ===
- Zak Grieve - Sentenced to life imprisonment.
- Darren Halfpenny - Pleaded guilty to helping carry out the murder of Ray Niceforo. Agreed to give evidence for the prosecution.
- Chris Malyschko - Admitted beating Ray Niceforo to death. Pleaded self defence.
- Bronwyn Malyschko - Former partner of Ray Niceforo and mother to Chris Malyschko. Paid $15,000 to have Ray Niceforo killed after suffering years of abuse.
- Ray Niceforo - A member of one of the most successful business families in Katherine.
- Trevor 'Nipper' Tydd - Bronywn's friend, Chris's flatmate and helped in the planning and organisation of the murder of Ray Niceforo.

=== Episodes ===
- "The Murder"
- "The Victim"
- "Zak"
- "The Trial"
- "Mandatory Sentencing"
- "The Missing Man"

== Music ==
The music for the series was composed by Helena Czajka.

== Release ==
=== Online ===
The series was streamed on The Australian newspaper's website from August 28, 2017. Each episode was supported on a custom built online hub, with additional material, including extensive editorial, extended interviews, maps, forensic photographs and interactive elements.

=== Broadcast ===
The series premiered on Crime + Investigation on September 27, 2017 and on NITV March 4, 2018.

== Awards and nominations ==
Year	Awards	Category	Nominated	Result
2018	Kennedy Awards	Outstanding Online Video	Nial Fulton, Ivan O'Mahoney, Dan Box	Won
2018	Logie Awards	Most Outstanding Factual Programme	In Films	Nominated
2018	Festival de Télévision de Monte-Carlo	Documentary	In Films	Nominated
2018	Australian Directors Guild Awards	Best Documentary Series	Ivan O'Mahoney	Nominated
2018	Banff Television Festival	Best Crime & Investigative Program	In Films	Nominated
2017	Screen Producers Australia	Best Documentary Series	In Films	Nominated
2017	Walkley Awards	Production	Nial Fulton, Ivan O'Mahoney	Nominated
2017	Walkley Awards	Cinematography	Aaron Smith	Nominated
2017	United Nations Media Awards	Best Online	In Films, The Australian Online	Nominated
2017	Australian Human Rights Commission Awards	Finalist	In Films	Nominated

== See also ==
- Mandatory Sentencing
- Northern Territory
