= Unseen Skies =

Documentary film

- Genre: Documentary film
- Written by: Yaara Bou Melhem
- Directed by: Yaara Bou Melhem
- Music by: Helena Czajka
- Country of origin: United States
- Original language: English

Production
- Executive producers: Ivan O'Mahoney; Nial Fulton; Diane Weyermann; Jeff Skoll
- Producer: Ivan O'Mahoney
- Cinematography: Tom Bannigan; Trevor Paglen
- Editor: Francisco Forbes
- Running time: 98 minutes
- Production companies: In Films; Participant Media; Magnolia Pictures

Unseen Skies is a 2021 documentary film directed by Yaara Bou Melhem. The film documents the work of artist Trevor Paglen as he undertakes one of his most ambitious projects, Orbital Reflector, launching an artwork into space to highlight the global impact of technology in the 21st century. The film had its premiere at the San Francisco International Film Festival in April 2021.

== Production and distribution ==
The film was produced by In Films and is distributed by Participant Media and Magnolia Pictures.

== Festivals ==
- Sydney Film Festival, 2021
- San Francisco International Film Festival, 2021

== Awards and nominations ==
- San Francisco International Film Festival, Golden Gate Award (Best Documentary Feature) - nominated
