= Nel Minchin =

Australian documentary film director

Nel Minchin (born 1984 or 1985) is an Australian documentary film director.

== Early life and education ==
Nel Minchin is the daughter of Ros and David Ellison Minchin. Her father and grandfather were both surgeons in Perth. She was raised in suburban Perth, the youngest of four siblings, Dan, Tim and Katie. She is a descendent of R. E. Minchin. She graduated from the Western Australian Academy of Performing Arts with a degree in broadcasting and then moved to London.

== Career ==
Minchin worked in television for 10 years, including as a researcher for Julia Zemiro’s Home Delivery series, before working for production company In Films. In 2014, she was involved in producing ABC documentary Gaycrashers about gay comedians Joel Creasey and Rhys Nicholson living in Colac for a week.

In 2016, Minchin wrote, narrated, and co-directed (with Rhian Skirving) Matilda and Me about her brother Tim Minchin's career and Matilda the Musical being staged in Australia. She said, "I think it was important not to be too objective in some ways, particularly about him ... You have to be objective about the telling of the story.” The film was nominated for Best Documentary Television Program at the 2016 AACTA Awards.

In 2017, Minchin directed Making Muriel about the making of the film Muriel's Wedding. In April 2020, she was asked to look at 20 hours of candid footage of cricketer Steve Waugh in India to "see if there was a film in it". Minchin and editor Peter Crombie interviewed other Australian and Indian cricketers remotely during COVID-19 lockdowns. The one hour film Capturing Cricket: Steve Waugh in India aired on the ABC in November that year.

In 2019, Minchin and Wayne Blair co-directed Firestarter: The Story of Bangarra about the origins of the Bangarra Dance Company and its director Stephen Page and his brothers. It was released theatrically through Icon Films and then aired on the ABC. It received very positive reviews, with The Guardian's Luke Buckmaster calling it "an exquisite new documentary directed with a fittingly rhythmic sense of motion and movement" by Blair and Minchin. Firestarter won the Adelaide Film Festival's documentary competition and inaugural "Change Award", which recognises "a film that celebrates social and environmental impact, while expressing a desire to live in new ways." It won the 2020 AACTA Award for Best Documentary, the 2021 Rose d'Or international award for best arts program, and the 2021 Walkley Documentary Award. Minchin and Blair won the 2021 Australian Directors' Guild Awards Best Direction in a Feature Documentary.

In 2021, Minchin wrote and directed the SBS special The Truth About Anxiety with Celia Pacquola, with comedian Pacquola interviewing other well-known people who experience anxiety disorders, as well as medical experts.

Minchin directed a two-part series called Folau about the cultural impact and tension of rugby player Israel Folau's Christian faith in sport in relation with the LGBTQ+ community. She said "It was about understanding where people come from, I don’t think it suggests we should sympathise [with Folau] as much as understand." The film was set to air on the ABC in November 2022, but was pulled by the broadcaster a few days beforehand. It was finally shown on the ABC in May 2023.

== Personal life ==
Minchin is married to Guy Patrick, an advertising art director. They have two daughters and live in Sydney.
