= In Films =

Australian television production company

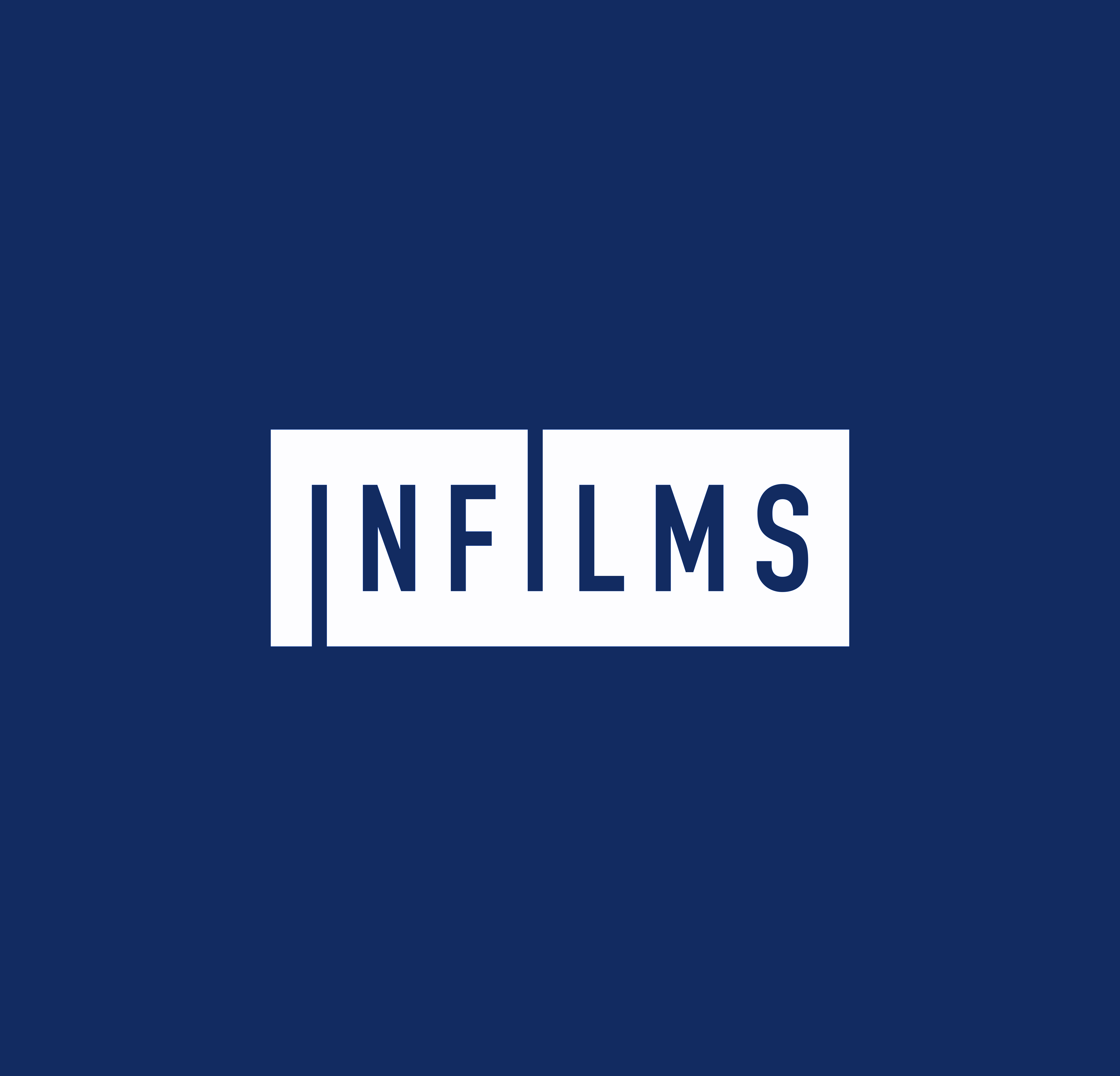
- Type: Private
- Industry: Television and film production
- Founded: 2013
- Founder: Nial Fulton; Ivan O'Mahoney
- Headquarters: Sydney, Australia
- Key people: Nial Fulton; Ivan O'Mahoney; Nel Minchin
- Products: Revelation; Borderland; Firestarter; Hitting Home
- Website: www.in-films.com

In Films is an Australian independent television production company. It specialises in social justice documentaries and is known for Hitting Home and Revelation; the US series Borderland; and Firestarter: The Story of Bangarra.

The company has won three Walkley Documentary Awards for journalism and every major Australian television award for their work.

== History ==
In Films was founded in 2013 by Nial Fulton and Ivan O'Mahoney. In 2016, the company was nominated for Best Breakthrough Business by Screen Producers Australia.

== Filmography ==
- 2023 – Untitled Feature Documentary (Post Production) Directed by Adam Kamien
- 2023 – Unbreakable (Post Production) Directed by Ivan O'Mahoney
- 2023 – The Whitley Art Scandal (ABC Television) Directed by Yaara Bou Melhem
- 2023 – Folau (ABC Television) Directed by Nel Minchin
- 2021 – Unseen Skies (Theatrical Release) Directed by Yaara Bou Melhem
- 2020 – Revelation (Netflix) Directed by Nial Fulton, Sarah Ferguson
- 2020 – Firestarter: The Story of Bangarra (Theatrical Release) Directed by Wayne Blair, Nel Minchin
- 2020 – Dubbo: Life of a Songman (ABC Television) Directed by Wayne Blair, Nel Minchin
- 2020 – Bangarra's World (ABC Television) Directed by Wayne Blair, Nel Minchin
- 2017 – The Queen & Zak Grieve (Foxtel) Directed by Ivan O'Mahoney
- 2017 – Making Muriel (ABC Television) Directed by Nel Minchin
- 2016 – Caged (SBS Television) Directed by Ivan O'Mahoney
- 2015 – Hitting Home (ABC Television) Directed by Ivan O'Mahoney
- 2015 – Matilda & Me (ABC Television) Directed by Nel Minchin
- 2014 – Borderland (Al Jazeera America) Directed by Darren Foster, Jeffrey Plunkett, Alex Simmons
- 2013 – The Outlaw Michael Howe (ABC Television) Directed by Brendan Cowell
