= Sue Spencer =

Australian journalist and television producer

Sue Spencer is an Australian journalist and television producer.

She is perhaps best known for her work on ABC Television's current affairs program Four Corners, where she initially commenced working as a researcher and producer in 1985 before becoming the program's executive producer in 2007.

Spencer has won four Walkley Awards, most recently for Most Outstanding Contribution to Journalism in 2019. In 1993 she was a co-recipient of the Gold Walkley with Phillip Chubb for the four-part documentary series Labor in Power.
