= Borderland (TV series) =

2014 television documentary series

- Genre: Documentary
- Based on: Undocumented Immigration
- Directed by: Darren Foster; Jeff Plunkett; Alex Simmons
- Starring: Alison Melder; Gary Larsen; Lis-Marie Alvarado; Kishana Holland; Randy Stufflebeam; Alex Seel
- Theme music composer: Roger Mason
- Country of origin: United States
- No. of seasons: 1
- No. of episodes: 4

Production
- Executive producers: Nial Fulton; Ivan O'Mahoney; Kathy Davidov
- Producers: Nial Fulton; Ivan O'Mahoney
- Production locations: United States; Mexico; El Salvador; Guatemala
- Editors: Andrew Cooke; Peter Crombie
- Camera setup: Peter Alton; Alex Cullen; Nathan Golon
- Production company: In Films

Original release
- Network: Al Jazeera America
- Release: April 13 – May 4, 2014

Borderland is a limited-run 2014 television documentary series, produced by Australian production company In Films. It was the first original commission for Al Jazeera America's documentary unit, premiering on 13 April 2014. The series followed six Americans as they retraced the fatal journey of three undocumented migrants who died attempting to cross into the United States.

== Background ==
Following the creation of Al Jazeera America on 2 January 2013, their factual department commissioned three award-winning documentary teams to produce original content for the channel. Newly formed Australian indie production company In Films were approached and despite geographical concerns, agreed to produce a series on undocumented immigration. The producers pitched a loose idea retracing the fatal last journey of an undocumented migrant.

In addition to Borderland, the network also commissioned Joe Berlinger and Radical Media to produce The System - exposing cases of alleged injustices in the US prison system and Alex Gibney to produce Edge of Eighteen, investigating the lives of 18 high school students across the US.

The producers visited the Pima County morgue in Tucson after reading an article about the number of unidentified migrants found every year in the Sonora Desert. Despite being in one of America's smallest cities, Pima County's is the busiest morgue in the nation. It is also home to the largest collection of missing persons reports for undocumented migrants in the United States. Bodies are stacked six high on industry shelves, which reach to the ceiling and stretch 30 feet to the back of the room. On any day, there could be 150 bodies inside the cool rooms and at least one hundred were people who died trying to cross the Sonoran Desert undocumented.

It is Dr. Greg Hess' job to identify and repatriate the remains. Despite the many challenges his team face, they are successful in identifying about two-thirds of the border crossers.

With hundreds of possible stories to work with, three were selected and the process of negotiating with their families began. Once all approvals had been obtained, the producers began organising the logistics of moving three separate production teams through some of the most dangerous locations anywhere in the world.

== Migrant stories ==
The three migrant stories selected were:

- Nelson Omar Chilel López, 13 years old (Guatemala)

Omar grew up in the coffee plantations of El Porvenir, Guatemala, a poverty-stricken area just south of the Mexican border. His mother Fermina left her family behind in 2006 to seek employment in the US. In 2010 Omar persuaded his mother to pay a 'coyote' to accompany him and a family friend, Doña Teresa, across the border to join him.

In 2012 the partial remains of Omar and Doña Teresa were found in Pima County. Through the work of Greg Hess' team at the Pima Country Medical Examiner's office, Fermina was finally reunited with her son.

- Claudeth Sánchez, 21 years old (Mexico)

Claudeth was the only daughter out of six siblings. The bright, ambitious young woman made the decision to cross into America to try and earn money for her parents. Her mother begged her not to go but to no avail. Claudeth and her smuggler both died in Pima Country, where her dental records, her clothes and DNA tests confirmed it was her.

- Maria Zelya, 39 years old (El Salvador)

Maria had crossed the border before and had spent years living among undocumented Salvadorans in Des Moines, Iowa. In 2009, immigration agents did a sweep of her apartment and although they were looking for someone else, she was deported. Against her mother's wishes, she decided to make the treacherous journey again. Despite the valiant efforts of a fellow traveller who risked his life carrying her to Border Patrol agents, Maria died at the age of 39.

== Casting ==
The Australian producers travelled to the United States, where a production office was established in Los Angeles. The production team were looking to show a cross-section of American society and diverse points of view in their participants.

Casting for the series began in mid-2013 and from over two thousand applicants, twelve participants were eventually vetted, undertook medical and psychological testing and whittled down to a final six.

- Alison Melder (28)

From Little Rock, Arkansas, Melder is a Republican State Senate aid. A former beautician and bikini model, she had never travelled outside the United States. Melder was angry and frustrated with the immigration system and government, unable to comprehend how there was 11 million undocumented people living in the United States.

- Gary Larsen (54)

From Pasco, Washington, Larsen is a third generation farmer, growing potatoes and asparagus on his 1,000 acre farm. All his 180 employees are Hispanic and while he says they all have paperwork showing their eligibility to work, he admits he has no idea who is in America legally and who is not. Larsen considers himself 'neutral' but leans towards letting more people into America.

- Liz-Marie Alvado (25)

From Homestead, Florida, Alvado arrived as a legal immigrant from Nicaragua when she was 12. As the sole Latina and native Spanish speaker in then cast, she said she sometimes felt removed from the group. She believes undocumented immigrants should not be deported and offered a pathway to citizenship.

- Kishana Holland (36)

From Las Vegas, Holland was on the 97th floor of the south tower of the World Trade Center when the plane hit on 9/11. She says the attack has made her a xenophobe and prompted her move to Las Vegas. The fashion blogger said she would deport all illegal immigrants as it makes her fear for her children's future.

- Randy Stufflebeam (53)

From Belleville, Illinois, Randy Stufflebeam is a retired US Marine and runs his own radio talk-show. A former write-in candidate for Governor of Illinois for his religiously conservative Constitution Party, he ran on a platform of cutting off health care, education and other government benefits to illegal immigrants. He had never been to the border.

- Alex Seel (31)

From Brooklyn, New York, Seel is a street photographer and artist. He believes borders shouldn't exist and says there is no such thing as illegal. Despite having friends who had made the journey, he wasn't prepared for what he saw making Borderland.

== Production ==
Starting at the Pima Country morgue, the series follows the six participants as they visit the López, Sánchez, and Zelaya families, trek through jungles, and cross dangerous rivers, travel on top of El tren de la muerte (The Train of Death) also known as Las Bestia (The Beast), the train many undocumented migrants ride through southern Mexico, and navigate their way through the cartel-controlled city of Culiacán, Mexico. The production team scouted a route through Mexico two months before the shoot and worked closely with security personnel to mitigate the dangers.

The series was shot on location in Mexico, Guatemala, El Salvador, and the United States. The first unit shot for two weeks in Usulután, El Salvador, home of Maria Zelya and her family, and in the capital San Salvador. The second unit shot in Omar Chilel López's hometown of El Porvenir in Guatemala and at the treacherous river crossing at Tech Uman.

The third unit set up a production base in Tapachula, Claudeth Sanchez's hometown in southern Mexico. All three units reunited in the Mexican town of Arriaga, where they join hundreds of migrants on the cargo train known as El tren de la muerte or La Bestia. Travelling through cartel territory, most women who undertake this journey will be sexually assaulted and many others die, falling from the roof of the train.

The next stage of the journey was Culiacán, a city in northwestern Mexico, controlled by the drug lord Joaquín Archivaldo Guzmán Loera, better known as El Chapo, and his Sinaloa Cartel. Under the protection of the Mexican Army, the participants are taken under armed guard to some recently captured illegal marijuana plantations that were being burned. They group also visited a cartel cemetery, where even in death, the drug lords are protected from their enemies.

At Altar, Mexico, the group observes the industry that has grown around border crossers. This is where you can hire a 'coyote' or people smuggler to help you into the United States.

== Broadcast ==
The series was broadcast on Al Jazeera America on 13 April 2014 and was met with widespread acclaim.

Alessandra Stanley of the New York Times said:

[I]t turns out there is a reason to watch Al Jazeera America.... Borderland is exploitative in a good way, using the ignorance of ordinary Americans to enlighten viewers about a problem so intractable that it's often easier not to look.

Kamaran Pasha, reviewing the series for The Huffington Post, wrote:

Borderland will touch you. It will make you angry. And it will make you weep. And in the process, you will never look at the issue of illegal immigration in the same way again.

== International broadcast ==
- Brazil - Pesadelos da Fronteira
- India - Borderland (English title)
- France - Borderland (English title)
- Poland - Borderland (English title)
- Latin-America (National Geographic) - Borderland (English title)

== Episodes ==
No.	Title	Original release date
1	"The Morgue"	April 13, 2014
Six Americans gather to embark on a haunting and perilous journey that begins inside the Pima County, Arizona morgue, in Tucson, Arizona.
2	"The Journey"	April 20, 2014
The six Americans are split into three groups, each tasked with retracing the journey of one of Pima County's dead migrants, discovering the grave circumstances that led to them risking everything for a new life.
3	"The Beast"	April 27, 2014
Things get very real in gang-controlled Arriaga, when the six Americans reunite in an abandoned train station. Like thousands before them, they must now risk everything to ride atop the freight train known as La Bestia (The Beast).
4	"The Desert"	May 4, 2014
In the final leg of their journey, the six must navigate the cartel-controlled Mexican city of Sinaloa and face the punishing hike across the border, through the sweltering Sonoran Desert.

== See also ==
- Brooks County, Texas
- Illegal immigration to the United States
- Missing in Brooks County
- No More Deaths
- Pima County, Arizona
