= The Killing Season (Australian TV series) =

2015 Australian television three-part documentary series

- Genre: Political docuseries
- Written by: Sarah Ferguson
- Presented by: Sarah Ferguson
- Composer: Pete Drummond
- Country of origin: Australia
- Original language: English
- No. of series: 1
- No. of episodes: 3

Production
- Executive producer: Sue Spencer
- Producer: Deborah Masters
- Editor: Lile Judickas
- Running time: 70 minutes – 88 minutes

Original release
- Network: ABC TV
- Release: 9 June – 23 June 2015

The Killing Season is a 2015 Australian three-part documentary television series which analyses the events of the Rudd–Gillard government which lasted from 2007 until 2013; it was a turbulent period in Australia’s modern political history. Journalist Sarah Ferguson interviewed the Australian Labor Party decision-makers and strategists who engaged in internal conflict that brought down a government that performed well during the 2008 financial crisis. The program followed the ABC's contemporary tradition of producing similar long-form retrospective documentary series of Australian governments, such as Labor in Power and The Howard Years.

== Ratings ==
| Episode | | Original air date | Overnight viewers | Nightly rank | Consolidated viewers | Adjusted rank | Ref |
|---|---|---|---|---|---|---|---|
| 1 | The Prime Minister And his loyal Deputy | 9 June 2015 | 986,000 | #5 | 1,179,000 | #2 | |
| 2 | Great Moral Challenge | 16 June 2015 | 968,000 | #7 | 1,130,000 | #3 | |
| 3 | The Long Shadow | 23 June 2015 | 979,000 | #6 | 1,121,000 | #5 | |

== Soundtrack ==
The soundtrack accompanying the opening titles and credits is the version of Schubert's Piano Trio No. 2 used in Stanley Kubrick's 1975 film Barry Lyndon.

== Awards ==
- Outstanding Public Affairs Report – 2016 Logie Awards
- AACTA Award for Best Documentary or Factual Program

== See also ==
- Labor in Power, a series on the first decade of the preceding Labor government from 1983 to 1996
- The Howard Years, a series on the preceding Coalition government from 1997 to 2007
- Nemesis, covering the Coalition government from 2013 to 2022
