= Oscar Redding =

Australian actor, screenwriter and director (born c.1974)

Oscar Redding (born c. 1974) is an Australian actor, screenwriter and director.

== Biography ==
Portrayed Alexander Pearce in Van Diemen's Land (2009). He also co-wrote the film with director Jonathan auf der Heide.

Redding directed the Australian film The Tragedy of Hamlet Prince of Denmark (2007), which he also adapted from the stage version that he directed. A modern version of Shakespeare's play. It was screened at the Melbourne International Film Festival in early August 2007.

Television credits include, but are not limited to, The Secret Life of Us, SeaChange, Stingers, Last Man Standing, Blue Heelers, Neighbours, Ponderosa, Backlands, Top of the Lake and Puberty Blues.

== Personal life ==
Oscar Redding lives in Melbourne.

== See also ==
- Hamlet on screen
