= Nemesis (Australian TV series) =

Documentary TV series in Australia

- Genre: Political docuseries
- Written by: Caitlin Shea
- Directed by: Kyle Taylor
- Composer: Helena Czajka
- Country of origin: Australia
- Original language: English
- No. of series: 1
- No. of episodes: 4

Production
- Executive producer: Morag Ramsay
- Producer: Caitlin Shea
- News editor: Mark Willacy
- Editors: Lile Judickas; Philippa Rowlands; Fred Shaw; Andrew Cooke; Simon Brynjolffssen; Johnathan Reed
- Running time: 28 minutes – 98 minutes

Original release
- Network: ABC TV
- Release: 29 January – 12 February 2024

Nemesis is a 2024 Australian three-part documentary television series produced by ABC TV which follows the Abbott, Turnbull and Morrison governments, as well as the leadership challenges faced by these prime ministers. Nemesis covers the period from Tony Abbott's election as Prime Minister in 2013 until the 2022 federal election, when Scott Morrison led the Liberal-National Coalition to defeat. The program follows the ABC's contemporary tradition of producing similar long-form retrospective documentary series of Australian governments, such as Labor in Power, The Howard Years and The Killing Season.

The series consists of more than 60 interviews with members of the Coalition governments conducted by investigative reporter Mark Willacy. Willacy interviewed key Coalition figures from the Liberal and National parties, including former Prime Ministers Malcolm Turnbull and Scott Morrison. Abbott declined to be interviewed, making him the first former prime minister to decline an interview in the three decades that the ABC has made these retrospective political documentaries.

Media reported various "revelations" from the series, including that:

- Abbott considered deploying Australian troops to the site of the Malaysia Airlines Flight 17 crash site
- Morrison initially thought that Abbott awarding a knighthood to Prince Philip was "fake news"
- After contacting Abbott after the September 2015 leadership spill, Abbott told Turnbull to "fuck off"
- Turnbull took his colleagues by surprise by calling the 2018 leadership spill
- Morrison took the decision to award himself multiple ministries "on the run"
- Morrison considered the AUKUS pact to be the best decision of his government
- Josh Frydenberg was urged to challenge Morrison for the leadership by some Liberals before the 2022 election but believed in the importance of remaining loyal to Morrison

Nemesis was first announced in November 2023, and first aired in January 2024.

== Episodes ==
Episode	Original broadcast date	Total viewers
The Abbott Years	29 January 2024	1,427,000
The Turnbull Years	5 February 2024	1,495,000
The Morrison Years	12 February 2024	1,510,000
Behind The Scenes	12 February 2024	780,000

== See also ==
- Labor in Power, a series on the first decade of the Labor government from 1983-1996
- The Howard Years, a series on the Coalition government from 1997-2007
- The Killing Season, a series on the Labor government from 2007-2013
