= Ciarán McMenamin =

Northern Irish actor

- Born: 1 October 1975 (age 51); Enniskillen, County Fermanagh, Northern Ireland
- Occupations: Actor, author
- Years active: 1998–present
- Spouse: Annabel Scholey (m. 2017; div. 2023)

Ciarán McMenamin (born 1 October 1975) is a Northern Irish actor and author.

== Early life ==
McMenamin was born in Enniskillen, County Fermanagh, Northern Ireland, where he attended St Michael's College. He earned his B.A. from the Royal Scottish Academy of Music and Drama in 1998. He attended drama classes at Ardhowen Youth Theatre before moving on to work with the Ulster Youth Theatre.

== Career ==
McMenamin has appeared on various BBC and ITV programmes, including "4:50 from Paddington", an episode of Agatha Christie's Marple, starring Geraldine McEwan, in which he played Cedric Crackenthorpe, and in the Channel 4 comedy series The Young Person's Guide To Becoming A Rock Star. In 1999 he was cast in the title role of the BBC1 television movie David Copperfield.

In 2012 he played leading fireman Frederick Barrett in the docudrama Saving The Titanic.

== Books ==
McMenamin's debut novel Skintown was published 15 May 2018. McMenamin's second book The Sunken Road was published 18 February 2021.

== Personal life ==
In 2017, he married English actress Annabel Scholey, the couple had one daughter before divorcing in 2023

== Filmography ==
Year	Film	Role	Notes
1998	Cluck	Martin	short
1998	Titanic Town	Dino/Owen	
1998	Rab C. Nesbitt	Young Man	TV series (1 episode: "Property")
1998	The Young Person's Guide to Becoming a Rock Star	Jez MacAllister	TV series (6 episodes)
1999	A Rap at the Door	Dermot Millen	
1999	The Trench	Pte. Charlie Ambrose	
1999	David Copperfield	David Copperfield	TV movie
2000	County Kilburn	Mickey	
2001	Sideshow	Hendrix	short
2001	The Last Minute	Garvey	
2001	To End All Wars	Capt. Ernest 'Ernie' Gordon	
2001	Fancy Dress	Monkey	short
2002	Sunday	Leo Young	TV movie
2002	Any Time Now	Johnny Doherty	TV series (4 episodes); Nominated—IFTA Award for Best Actor in a TV Drama
2002	Weird Nature	Narrator	Six-part nature documentary on the BBC and Discovery Channel
2002	Bollywood Queen	Dean	
2002	Birthday Girl	Donal	TV movie
2003	Lena: The Bride of Ice		
2003	Watermelon	Adam Collins	TV movie
2003	Strange	Liam	TV series (1 episode: "Costa Burra")
2003	The Private Life of Samuel Pepys	Will Hewer	TV movie
2004	Pulling Moves	Tomas 'Ta' McKeown	TV series (10 episodes)
2004	Agatha Christie's Marple	Cedric Crackenthorpe	4:50 from Paddington
2004	Silent Witness	Joe Galvin	TV series (2 episodes: "A Time to Heal")
2005	Jericho	D.C. John Caldicott	TV series (4 episodes)
2005	The Golden Hour	Dr. Paul Keane	TV series (4 episodes)
2007	True Dare Kiss	Bryce Waghorn	TV series (6 episodes)
2008	Messiah: The Rapture	Daniel Hughes	TV movie
2008	The Fixer	Scott Glover	TV series (1 episode: "Episode #1.4")
2008	Silent Witness	Rhys Allen	TV series (2 episodes)
2008	The Last Confession of Alexander Pearce	Alexander Pearce	
2009	Jonathan Creek	Glen	TV series (1 episode: "The Grinning Man")
2009	Demons	Quincey	TV series (1 episode: "Suckers")
2009	One Hundred Mornings	Jonathan	
2010	Outcast	Liam	
2011	Primeval	Matt Anderson	TV series (13 episodes)
2011	The Sinking of the Laconia	Declan McDermott	TV mini-series (2 episodes)
2011	32 Brinkburn Road	Sid	TV mini-series (4 episodes)
2012	Saving the Titanic	Frederick Barrett	TV movie
2012	Jump	Ross	
2012	Lewis	Nick Addams	TV series (S6:E3 "Fearful Symmetry")
2013	Made in Belfast	Jack Kelly	Theater
2014	Death in Paradise	Dan Parish	TV series (1 episode: "Episode #3.6")
2014	Land Is God	Seamus	short
2014	Shooting for Socrates	Sammy McIlroy	
2015	Rapt	Jonathan	TV mini-series (3 episodes)
2016	Heretiks	William Carpenter	
2016	Midsomer Murders	Craig Coffley	TV series (1 episode: "Habeas Corpus")
2016	In View	Denis	
2016	Una	John	
2016	Delicate Things	Jonathan	short
2017	Paula	McGlynn	TV mini-series (2 episodes)
2018	The Convent	William Carpenter	
2018	Grace & Goliath	Marcus	
2020	Rig 45	Trevor	TV series (6 episodes)
2021-2024	Hope Street	Inspector Finn O'Hare	Main role
