= Crossroads Film Festival =

Annual film festival in Mississippi, U.S.

- Location: Jackson, Mississippi USA
- Founded: 1999
- Language: International
- Website: http://www.crossroadsfilmfestival.com/

The Crossroads Film Festival is an independent film festival that takes place annually around the Jackson metropolitan area in the U.S. state of Mississippi. The second oldest film festival in Mississippi, Crossroads Film Festival focuses on independent film of all kinds, as well as regional and Mississippi films. Its parent organization, the Crossroads Film Society, celebrated the 20th Festival in April, 2019.

The festival takes place over four days, as more than 100 selected films are screened throughout the weekend. Special events include educational film-related workshops, panels, and Master Classes; kid-friendly activities; live local music; nightly after-parties; and special badge-holders-only receptions. An awards brunch on the Sunday of the festival culminates in awards and other prizes being given to winning films and filmmakers. Workshops, parties, and receptions are typically held at various locations, including Millsaps College, local clubs and restaurants, and the Mississippi Museum of Art.

Founded in 1999, the 501(c)(3) nonprofit Crossroads Film Society is a membership organization created to promote, highlight, and grow independent film and filmmaking in the Deep South, especially among female and young filmmakers, filmmakers of color, members of the LGBTQ+ community, and indigenous filmmakers.

The mission of Crossroads Film Society is to celebrate the art of filmmaking in all of its diversity and depth; showcase and promote a broader spectrum of film and video for the community; present and honor film related to Mississippi and the South; and provide educational opportunities and forums of discussion for film lovers and aspiring filmmakers.

== Naming ==
The Crossroads Film Festival was named in part for the widely known area of Mississippi where Robert Johnson was said to have sold his soul to the devil. It is also a reference to hometown Jackson's role as a metropolitan hub of the New South.

== Virtual Crossroads 2020 ==
Due to low movie theatre attendance during the COVID-19 pandemic in 2020, the 21st Crossroads Film Festival was held completely virtually and involved a profit-share initiative to support filmmakers. Unlike previous years, was held from November 12 to December 15 on Eventive, an streaming platform that supports film festivals.

== Awards ==
- Best Experimental Film
- Best Animated Film
- Best Music Video
- Best Student Film
- Best Short Documentary
- Best Feature Documentary
- Best Short Narrative
- Best Feature Narrative
- Programmer's Choice
- The Adam Ford Youth Filmmaking Award
- Transformative Film Award
- Audience Choice - Film
- Audience Choice - Music Video
- The Ruma Award (for most promising Mississippi filmmaker)
