= Alexander Pearce =

Irish convicted criminal and confessed cannibal

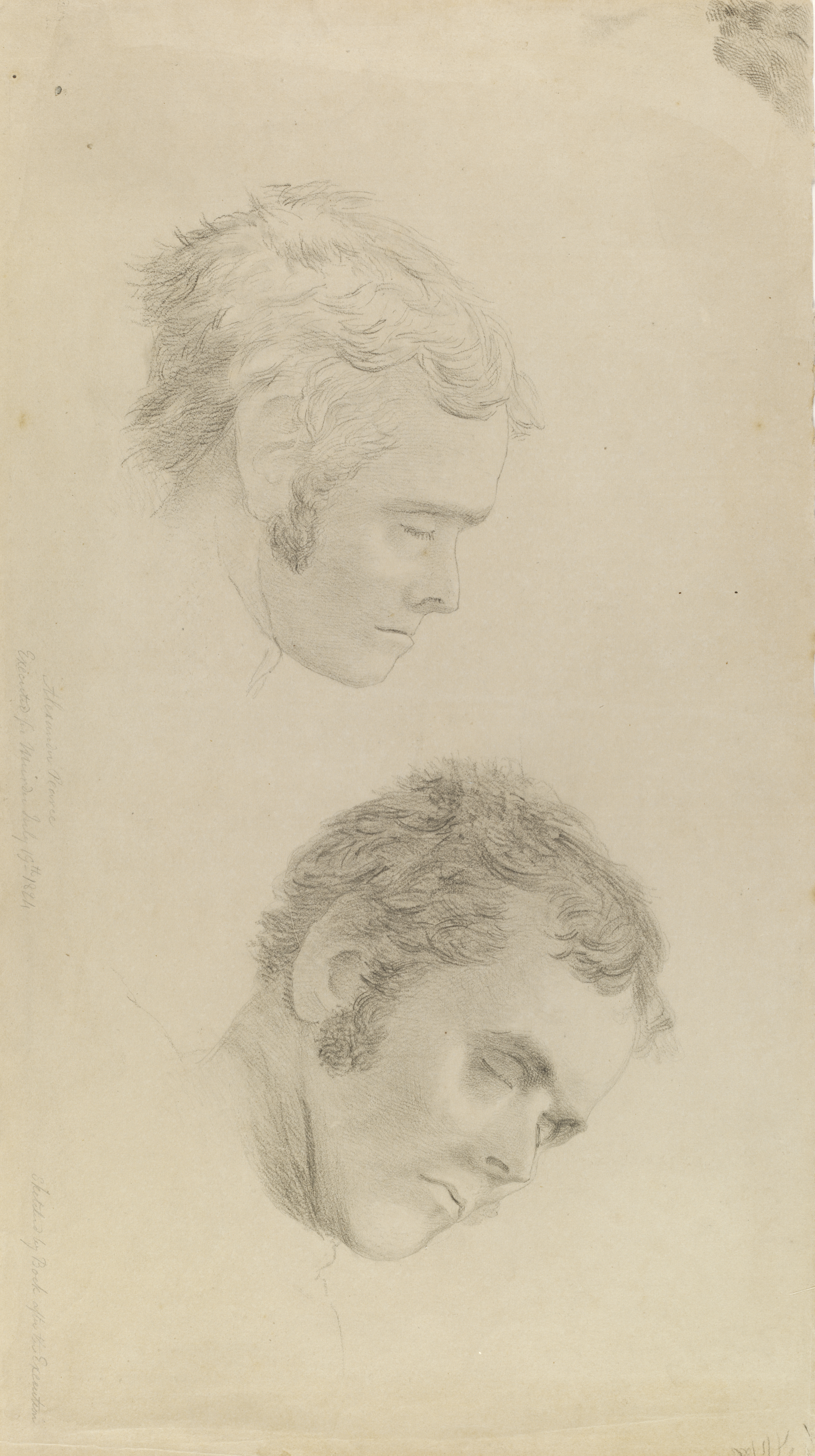
Drawings, by Thomas Bock, of the face of Alexander Pearce after his execution.

Alexander Pearce (1790 – 19 July 1824) was an Irish convict who was transported to the penal colony in Van Diemen's Land (now Tasmania), Australia for seven years for theft. He escaped from prison several times, allegedly becoming a cannibal during two of the escapes. He was eventually captured and was hanged in Hobart for murder, before being dissected.

== Early life ==
Pearce was born in County Monaghan, Ireland. A Roman Catholic farm labourer, he was sentenced at Armagh in 1819 to penal transportation to Van Diemen's Land for "the theft of six pairs of shoes". He continued to commit various petty offences whilst in the penal colony in Van Diemen's Land, from which he soon escaped. The 18 May 1822 edition of the Hobart Town Gazette reported this escape and advertised a £10 reward for his recapture. When caught, he was charged with absconding and forging an order, a serious crime. For this, he received a second sentence of transportation, this time to the new secondary penal establishment at Sarah Island in Macquarie Harbour.

== Escape and cannibalism ==
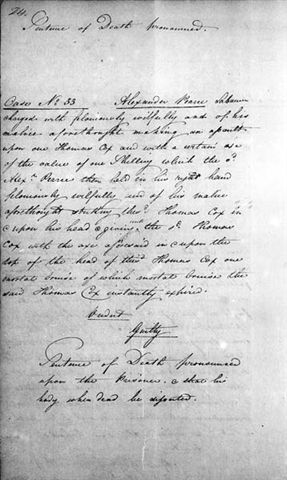
Copy of the death sentence pronounced on Alexander Pearce

On 20 September 1822, Pearce along with seven other convicts of Macquarie Harbour Penal Station – Alexander Dalton, Thomas Bodenham, William Kennerly, Matthew Travers, Edward Brown, Robert Greenhill and John Mather – escaped while working on the eastern side of the harbour. Greenhill, who had an axe, appointed himself leader, supported by his friend Travers, with whom he had been sent to Macquarie Harbour for stealing businessman Anthony Fenn Kemp's schooner in an attempt to escape. About 15 days into the journey, the men were starving and drew lots to see who would be killed for food. Thomas Bodenham (or perhaps Alexander Dalton: see below) drew the short straw and Greenhill dispatched him with an axe. At this point three of the company – Dalton, Kennerly, and Brown – took fright and decamped. Kennerly and Brown reached Macquarie Harbour, but Dalton seemed to have died of exhaustion. That left Greenhill, Travers, John Mather, and Alexander Pearce. With Greenhill and Travers acting as a team, Mather's or Pearce's turn would be next. Pearce seems to have sided with Greenhill and Travers at this point, and Mather was the next victim. Travers was then bitten on the foot by a snake. Greenhill insisted they carry him for five days, but when it became clear he would not recover, they killed him.

Allegedly, Pearce grabbed the axe, killed Greenhill and ate him. He later raided an Aboriginal campsite and stole more food. He reached the settled districts, and the shepherd who came upon him eating a lamb was an old friend. Pearce was inducted into a sheep-stealing ring, and was eventually picked up with William Davis and Ralph Churton, who were both hanged on 14 April 1823 for sheep stealing .

In total, Pearce had been on the run for 113 days, a little less than half of which was spent in the wilderness. Locked up in Hobart, Pearce made a confession to the Rev. Robert Knopwood, the magistrate and chaplain. However, Knopwood did not believe the cannibalism story and was convinced the others were still living as bushrangers. He sent Pearce back to Macquarie Harbour.

There are inconsistencies in Pearce's story. He made three confessions – the Knopwood confession; a confession to Lt. Cuthbertson, Commandant of Macquarie Harbour when he was in hospital after the second escape (in this version, Dalton is the first victim); and a confession to Father Philip Conolly, the colony's Catholic priest, the night before his execution – and some of the details differed. What is incontrovertible is that eight men went into the bush at Macquarie Harbour, and only three came out; and of the four men alive when Dalton, Kennerly and Brown decamped, only one survived.

In November of the subsequent year, Pearce managed to escape once again, this time accompanied by a fellow convict named Thomas Cox. However, Pearce's freedom was short-lived as he was recaptured within a mere ten days. He was then brought to trial at the Supreme Court of Van Diemen's Land in Hobart. The trial centred around his alleged murder and cannibalization of Thomas Cox.

Observers noted that Pearce did not fit the stereotypical image of a cannibal. Despite his relatively small stature of 1.6 metres (5 feet 3 inches), which was below average for that era, he possessed a strong and wiry build. Such physical attributes did not seem to align with the description of someone who had supposedly engaged in cannibalistic acts. A report published in the Hobart Town Gazette on 25 June 1824, even mentioned that he did not appear burdened by the "weight of human blood" and allegations of consuming human flesh.

During his apprehension, portions of Cox's remains were found in Pearce's pockets. This evidence, combined with Pearce's confession, left little room for doubt about his culpability. In his confession, Pearce revealed that he had killed Cox upon realizing that Cox was unable to swim when they reached King's River.

Notably, Pearce's case marked several firsts within the Tasmanian judicial system. He was the inaugural felon to face execution under the new Supreme Court framework. Additionally, his confession made him the first known individual within the Tasmanian courts to admit to acts of cannibalism.

Alexander Pearce was hanged at the Hobart Town Gaol at 9 am on 19 July 1824, after receiving the last rites from Father Conolly.

== Legacy ==
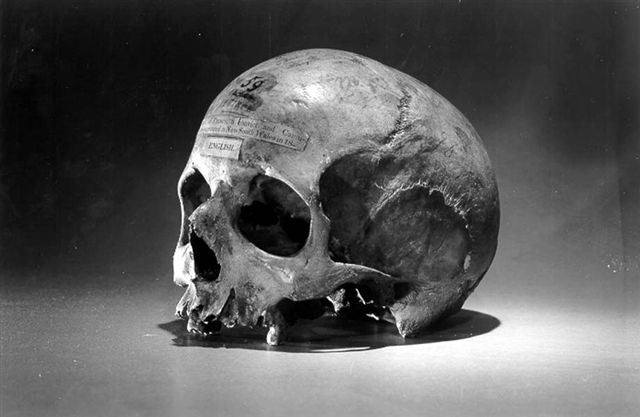
Pearce's skull

- Pearce's skull is believed to have been sold by the surgeon who dissected him to American naturalist and skull collector Samuel George Morton and is housed along with the rest of his collection at Penn Museum in Philadelphia.
- Pearce is the subject of the Australian band Weddings Parties Anything's song "A Tale They Won't Believe". The narrative in the song follows the account given in The Fatal Shore by Robert Hughes.
- Australian band The Drones recorded "Words from the Executioner to Alexander Pearce".
- His adventures were fictionalised as the character Gabbett in Marcus Clarke's 1874 novel For the Term of His Natural Life.
- A biographical film, The Last Confession of Alexander Pearce, was shot on location in 2008 in Tasmania and Sydney and starred Adrian Dunbar, Ciaran McMenamin, Dan Wyllie, Don Hany and Chris Haywood. It was shown on RTÉ in Ireland on 29 December 2008 and ABC1 in Australia on 25 January 2009.
- Also in 2008, Dying Breed, a horror film about Pearce was released. It featured fictional "descendants" of Pearce. Shot in Tasmania and Melbourne (including at the Pieman River on the West Coast of Tasmania), Dying Breed stars writer/actor Leigh Whannell and Nathan Phillips.
- The story of Pearce's cannibalism was made into another feature-length movie called Van Diemen's Land, released to Australian cinemas in September 2009.

== See also ==
- Alferd Packer
- Convicts on the West Coast of Tasmania
- Hells Gates
- List of convicts transported to Australia
- List of incidents of cannibalism
- List of serial killers by country
