= Firestarter: The Story of Bangarra =

Australian 2020 feature documentary

- Directed by: Wayne Blair; Nel Minchin
- Written by: Wayne Blair; Nel Minchin
- Produced by: Ivan O'Mahoney
- Starring: David Page; Stephen Page; Russell Page; Wesley Enoch; Hunter Page-Lochard
- Cinematography: Andy Taylor; Aaron Smith; Tyson Perkins
- Edited by: Nick Meyers; Karen Johnson
- Production company: In Films
- Release date: 2020
- Country: Australia
- Language: English

Firestarter: The Story of Bangarra is a 2020 Australian documentary film directed by Wayne Blair and Nel Minchin. It tells the story of the three Page brothers' – Stephen, David and Russell – and their role in the development of Bangarra Dance Theatre.

Firestarter was produced by In Films and premiered on 11 October 2020 at the Brisbane International Film Festival. It received critical and audience acclaim and won the AACTA Best Documentary Award (2021), the Rose d'Or Award for Best Arts Program (2021), the Most Outstanding Documentary Logie Award (2022) and the Walkley Documentary Award (2021).

== Production ==
The film documents the establishment and development of Bangarra Dance Theatre, tracing its origins in the late 1980s, through the politically difficult 1990s, and into the 21st century as it grew to become one of Australia's prominent cultural institutions. It includes archival footage and interviews with co-founders Carole Johnson, Cheryl Stone and former dancers and creatives.

== Release ==
The film had its world premiere at the Brisbane International Film Festival on 11 October 2020 and was the closing night film. It was the opening night film at the Sydney Film Festival (2020), Byron Bay International Film Festival (2020), Revelation Perth International Film Festival (2020) and Birrarangga Film Festival (2021).

It won the Special Jury Commendation Prize at the Port Townsend Film Festival (2021), the Documentary Award and Inaugural Change Award at the Adelaide International Film Festival (2021), and Best Documentary Award at the Pan African Film + Arts Festival (2021).

The film premiered on ABC Television on 6 July 2021.

== Reception ==
On Rotten Tomatoes, the film has a score of 100% based on reviews from 12 critics.

Guardian critic Luke Buckmaster gave the film five stars, saying 'What an experience. What a joy. I've watched it twice, and on both occasions emerged deeply moved.'

The Sydney Morning Herald said 'That's a lot to pack into 90 minutes, a challenge which writer-directors Nel Minchin and Wayne Blair fluidly accomplish while fashioning a compelling, sometimes joyful and sometimes heart-breaking tale of resilience and fragility.'

== Accolades ==
Award	Year	Category	Recipient(s)	Result	Ref.
AACTA Awards	2020	Best Documentary	Firestarter	Won	
AACTA Awards	2020	Best Editing in a Documentary	Nick Myers, Karen Johnson	Nominated	
AACTA Awards	2020	Best Sound in a Documentary	Angus Robertson, Tara Webb, Leah Katz, Nick Meyers	Nominated	
Rose d'Or Awards	2021	Best Arts Program	Firestarter	Won	
Walkley Awards	2021	Documentary Award	Firestarter	Won	
Logie Awards	2022	Most Outstanding Documentary	Wayne Blair, Nel Minchin	Won	
Australian Directors Guild Awards	2021	Best Direction in a Documentary	Wayne Blair, Nel Minchin	Won	
Screen Producers Australia Awards	2021	Feature Documentary Award	Firestarter	Nominated	
Adelaide Film Festival	2021	Documentary Award	Firestarter	Won	
Adelaide Film Festival	2021	Inaugural Change Award	Firestarter	Won	
AIDC Awards	2021	Best Feature Documentary	Firestarter	Nominated	
Australian Screen Sound Guild Awards	2021	Best Sound in a Documentary	Angus Robertson, Tara Webb, Leah Katz, Nick Meyers	Nominated	
Australian Screen Writers Guild Awards	2021	Best Documentary	Wayne Blair, Nel Minchin	Nominated	
TBI Content Innovation Award	2021	Best Representation on Screen	Firestarter	Nominated	
