= Sarah Ferguson (journalist) =

British–Australian journalist (born 1965)

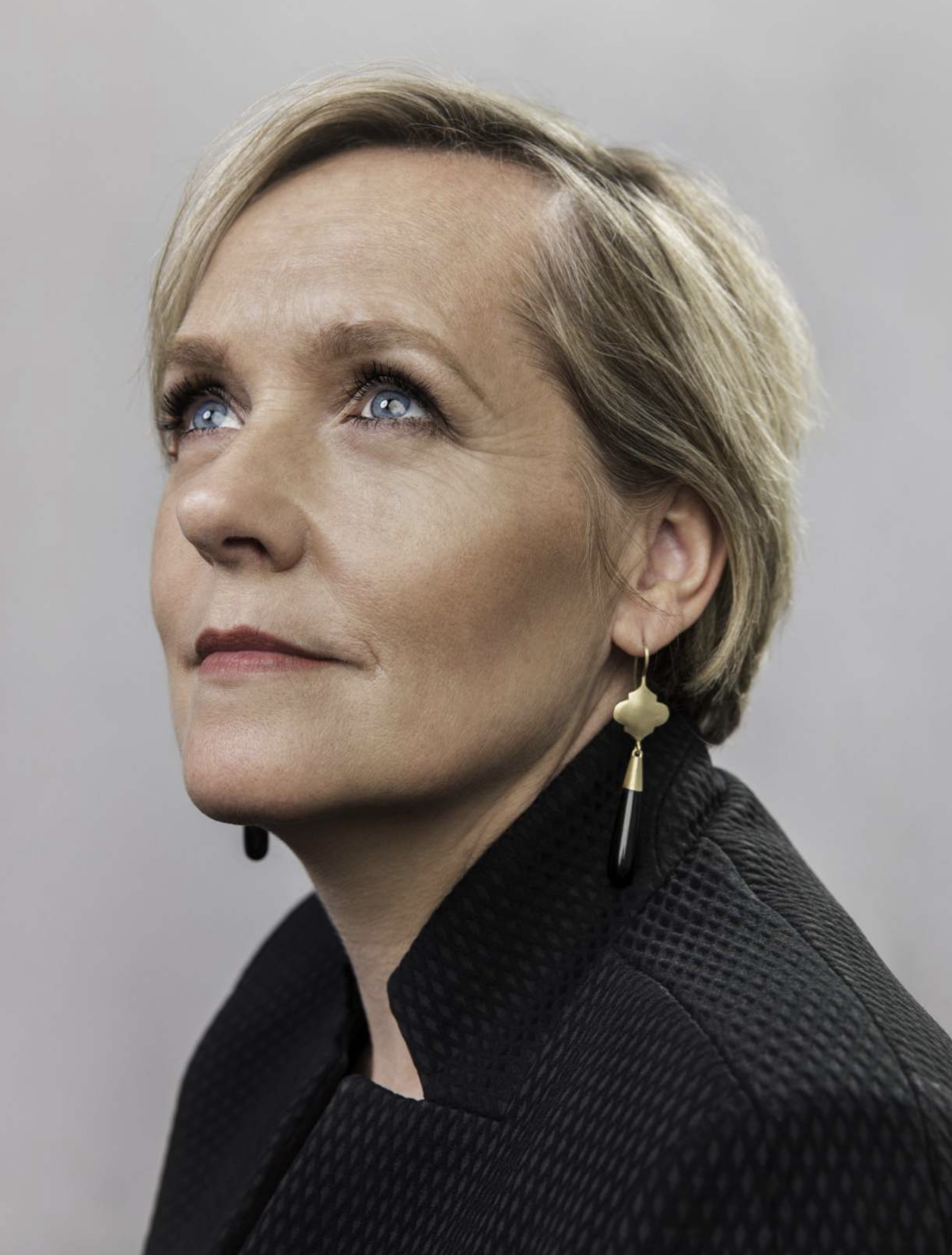
- Born: 3 February 1965 (age 61); Lagos, Nigeria
- Citizenship: Australia; United Kingdom
- Occupations: Journalist; reporter; TV presenter; producer
- Employer: Australian Broadcasting Corporation
- Known for: 7.30; Revelation; Hitting Home; The Killing Season; Four Corners
- Spouse: Tony Jones (married 1992 or 1993–present)
- Children: 3
- Awards: Gold Walkley; Walkley Award; AACTA Documentary Award; Logie Award

Sarah Ferguson (born 3 February 1965) is an Australian journalist, reporter and television presenter. She is the host of ABC TV's flagship news and current affairs program 7.30. She was previously a journalist for Dateline, Insight, Sunday and Four Corners.

== Personal life ==
Ferguson was born in Lagos, Nigeria, in 1965 to Iain and Marjorie. She has two older brothers. The onset of the Nigerian Civil War led the family to move back to the United Kingdom when Ferguson was a toddler. She attended New Hall, a Catholic-run private girls school in Boreham, Essex. She later studied English literature at King's College, London. In her early teens, she began a correspondence with the poet Philip Larkin. In a teenage essay she said that she wanted to be "a commando and a librarian in the British House of Commons".

Ferguson married journalist Tony Jones in 1992 or 1993. (Note: Varies depending on source) They have three sons, including one from Jones' previous relationship.

In 2017, the honorary degree of Doctor of Letters was conferred on Ferguson by the University of Sydney for excellence in journalism.

== Career ==
Ferguson's career began in newspapers in the United Kingdom, writing arts reviews for The Independent. Later she moved to Paris and worked as a researcher and production assistant on arts programs for French and British broadcasters. In 1992, Australian journalist and the ABC's London correspondent, Tony Jones, hired Ferguson to help him on a story about French politics.

In 2000, Ferguson worked as a reporter for Dateline and Insight. In 2004 she joined the Sunday program on Channel Nine and in 2008 joined Four Corners, the ABC's long form current affairs program.

=== Australian Broadcasting Corporation ===
In 2011, Ferguson reported on the live cattle export trade in Australian cattle to Indonesia. The episode, "A Bloody Business", won the Gold Walkley Award and led to suspension of the trade. Ferguson won the Logie for Most Outstanding Public Affairs Report in 2010, 2011, 2012 and 2013.

In 2014, Ferguson hosted 7.30 and her interviews with the Australian treasurer Joe Hockey were nominated for a Walkley for journalistic excellence. They would later be described as "aggressive" and "the tone of the questioning could have been interpreted by some viewers to be a potential breach of the ABC's impartiality guidelines".

In 2014, Ferguson caused controversy at the Walkley Awards when she publicly railed against job cuts at the ABC. Ferguson presented two series for the ABC in 2015. She wrote and presented The Killing Season, a documentary series on the Rudd/Gillard years, analysing the events of the Labor governments of 2007 to 2013. The series won the AACTA award for documentary in 2015.

In November 2015, Ferguson replaced Kerry O'Brien as host of Four Corners.

In 2017, as Ferguson was getting off a plane, she was told that her mother Marjorie had died suddenly in England. Later she became aware that hospital negligence had led to her mother's death. She wrote about the experience in her book On Mother.

In May 2017, Ferguson presented "The Siege", a two-part special investigating the 2014 Sydney hostage crisis at the Lindt Cafe in Martin Place, Sydney. Ferguson interviewed the families of Tori Johnson and Katrina Dawson and the surviving hostages and examined how authorities had failed to comprehend the risk posed by hostage-taker Man Haron Monis.

In June 2018, Ferguson presented and produced "Trump/Russia", a Four Corners three-part series on President Donald Trump and his connections to Russia. The series was filmed over several months in the United States, the United Kingdom and Russia. In November 2018, Ferguson reported and presented "Bitter End" about conflict within the ABC which led to the resignations of its managing director Michelle Guthrie and chair Justin Milne within one week.

In 2020, the ABC announced Ferguson would take up a short term role as a "special reporter" in Washington in early 2021.

In April 2022, the ABC announced Ferguson would return to Australia to succeed Leigh Sales as the host of ABC TV's flagship news and current affairs program 7.30 from July 2022.

In 2026 Ferguson was named, with the unrelated Adele Ferguson, by PR consultant Toby Ralph, as the "most feared interviewer on television" ... "she's an attack dog – she never lets go".

=== Documentaries ===
Ferguson has collaborated with producer Nial Fulton on two documentary series for ABC. In 2016 she presented Hitting Home on domestic violence in Australia. The series won Best Documentary at the 2016 AACTA Awards and the Walkley Documentary Award.

In 2018, Ferguson started working on Revelation, a three-part documentary series for the ABC about the Catholic Church sexual abuse cases in Australia.

Revelation aired on ABC on 17 March, 31 March and 2 April 2020. Ferguson interviewed convicted Catholic priest Father Vincent Ryan and Bernard McGrath, a former religious brother from the Order of St John of God.

In "Goliath", the third episode of Revelation, Ferguson interviewed two men, identified as Bernie and Peter Clarke, who accused Australian cardinal George Pell of sexually abusing them as boys when he was a priest in the Diocese of Ballarat and investigated their accusations. The alleged sexual abuse occurred when Pell spent time at the Catholic orphanage where the men resided in the 1970s.

Following Pell's acquittal and subsequent release from Barwon Prison, the producers temporarily removed the third episode of the series to include these developments before restoring the episode to the ABC iView platform. The ABC also released a statement which stood by the program's content, stating "The ABC has – and will continue to – report accurately and without fear or favour on stories that are in the public interest, including this one".

Following Revelation, Ferguson stepped down as presenter of Four Corners and accepted the role of China bureau chief for the ABC. After a year of political turmoil in the region, with journalists forced to leave China, her visa did not eventuate.

=== "Fox and the Big Lie" ===
In August 2021, Ferguson's two-part report "Fox and the Big Lie" screened on Four Corners. It investigated how the Rupert Murdoch-owned American cable network Fox News allegedly became a propaganda vehicle for Donald Trump and helped destabilise America. Ferguson interviewed Fox identities, including Gretchen Carlson and former Fox political editor Chris Stirewalt. Prior to broadcast, Fox News sent a legal threat to the ABC, stating that the broadcaster had "violated" its own standards by "exhibiting bias".

The Murdoch-owned newspaper The Australian published 45 articles in two days attacking the program, accusing the ABC of doing a "full frontal hit-job on Rupert Murdoch, NewsCorp and the US Fox News Channel". Episode 1 was watched by 586,000 viewers. News Corp denied there had been a coordinated campaign against the program. The ABC said the News Corp response was expected and that "the striking uniformity of the attacks from News Corp journalists, commentators and outlets ... has only further served to highlight the importance of having a range of independent voices in the Australian media. News Corp not liking a story does not mean the story is biased or inaccurate".

Ferguson responded to the threat of legal action by Fox News, stating that "We're not in fear of anything ... there are fewer more important stories to look at in America right now".

In the second episode of Fox and the Big Lie, Ferguson's interview with former federal prosecutor and Trump lawyer Sidney Powell generated international headlines as Powell struggled to answer questions about her claims Smartmatic and Dominion were involved in rigging the 2020 Presidential Election. Ferguson asked Powell what fact-checking she had done to find out what Smartmatic's actual involvement in the election was. Powell responded that she was confused as to why Ferguson was interviewing her. Ferguson explained it was because Powell had made a series of very strong allegations against Smartmatic and Dominion, containing 'many errors of fact.' Ferguson then said 'You said Smartmatic owns Dominion. How do you justify such a basic factual error?' Powell walked out of the interview, only to reluctantly come back and continue to stick to her baseless claims.

After Powell said the election fraud had been planned for at least three years, Ferguson asked her: Do you ever hear yourself and think it sounds ridiculous? Powell replied: No. I know myself very well. I've been me a long time.

The Australian Communications and Media Authority finalised a year-long investigation on 19 December 2022 which was prompted by various complaints about the story by Fox News. Although the ACMA dismissed most of the complaints, they did find that Ferguson's report had breached two standards in the ABC Code of Practice 2019 – standard 2.2 (materially misled) and standard 5.1 (inform participants of the nature of their participation).

The ACMA concluded that the program omitted key information that resulted in information being conveyed in a way that materially misled the audience. The ACMA found that the ABC failed to include information about two Fox News presenters (Sean Hannity and Jeanine Pirro) being censured after appearing at a Donald Trump rally and also neglected to report on the role social media played prior to the Capitol riots. The ACMA also found that an interviewee (Jeanine Pirro) was not adequately informed about the way the program would be presented.

The ACMA rejected Fox News' suggestions that Ferguson's report was partisan. However, the ACMA reasoned that the program "came close to, but did not breach" the impartiality standards in the code, finding that there were instances where Ferguson used "emotive and strident language" (specifically her use of the word "mob") but did show impartiality in her questioning.

In a statement, the ABC defended Ferguson's story. The organisation described Ferguson's story as a "world class report" and "a strong and measured piece of public interest journalism". The ABC criticised the ACMA by saying their interpretation of the code could have negative consequences for public interest journalism, and were "deeply concerned at the ACMA's subjective characterisation of the program".

Ferguson also publicly responded to the findings of the ACMA investigation. She accused the regulator of issuing an "inflammatory" media release and failing to understand journalism. Ferguson accused the ACMA of creating the impression that her story was misleading and dishonest when in fact that regulator had found only three minor subjective breaches and had dismissed 19 complaints. She also accused the ACMA of attempting to restrict the ABC's freedom in choosing the most relevant editorial focus of its programs which Ferguson considers to be central to the success of current affairs programs like Four Corners.

Ferguson's report was also defended by the ABC's director of news, analysis and investigations Justin Stevens, who also criticised the ACMA's findings.

== Filmography ==
- 2008 – Buying Back The River
- 2009 – Code of Silence
- 2011 – A Bloody Business
- 2012 – Another Bloody Business
- 2012 – Growing Up Poor
- 2013 – Trading Misery
- 2015 – Hitting Home
- 2015 – The Killing Season
- 2016 – The Leaders
- 2017 – The Siege
- 2018 – Trump/Russia
- 2018 – Bitter End
- 2019 – Revelation
- 2021 – Fox and the Big Lie
- 2022 – Despair and Defiance: The Battle for Ukraine

== Bibliography ==
- Ferguson, Sarah (2016). On Mother. Carlton, Victoria: Melbourne University Publishing. ISBN 978-0-522-87408-2.
- Ferguson, Sarah; Drum, Patricia (2016). The Killing Season Uncut. Carlton, Victoria: Melbourne University Publishing. ISBN 978-0-522-86995-8.

== Awards ==
Key Awards and Nominations
Award	Title	Year	Category	Recipient(s)	Result
Queensland Premier's Literary Awards	Code of Silence	2009	Harry Williams Award	Sarah Ferguson	Won
Walkley Awards	Code of Silence	2009	Best Sports Journalism	Sarah Ferguson, Kate Wild, Anne Connolly, Ivan O'Mahoney	Won
TV Week Logie Awards	Smuggler's Paradise	2011	Most Outstanding Public Affairs Report	Sarah Ferguson, Michael Doyle	Won
Walkley Awards	A Bloody Business	2011	Gold Walkley Award	Sarah Ferguson, Michael Doyle, Anne Worthington	Won
Walkley Awards	A Bloody Business	2011	Documentary Award	Sarah Ferguson, Michael Doyle, Anne Worthington	Won
Melbourne Press Club	Smuggler’s Paradise Australia	2012	Gold Quill Award	Sarah Ferguson	Won
TV Week Logie Awards	A Bloody Business	2012	Most Outstanding Public Affairs Report	Sarah Ferguson, Michael Doyle	Won
AACTA Awards	The Killing Season	2015	AACTA Award for Best Documentary	Sarah Ferguson, Deborah Masters	Won
TV Week Logie Awards	The Killing Season	2015	Most Outstanding Public Affairs Report	Sarah Ferguson, Deborah Masters	Won
Amnesty International Australia Media Awards	Hitting Home	2016	Television Award	Sarah Ferguson, Nial Fulton, Ivan O'Mahoney	Won
AACTA Awards	Hitting Home	2016	AACTA Award for Best Documentary	Sarah Ferguson, Nial Fulton, Ivan O'Mahoney	Won
Our Watch Awards	Hitting Home	2016	Best Longform	Sarah Ferguson, Nial Fulton, Ivan O'Mahoney	Won
Screen Producers Australia	Hitting Home	2016	Series Documentary Production	Sarah Ferguson, Nial Fulton, Ivan O'Mahoney	Nominated
TV Week Logie Awards	Hitting Home	2016	Most Outstanding Public Affairs Report	Sarah Ferguson, Nial Fulton, Ivan O'Mahoney	Nominated
Walkley Awards	Hitting Home	2016	Documentary Award	Sarah Ferguson, Nial Fulton, Ivan O'Mahoney	Won
Asian Academy Creative Awards	Revelation	2020	Best Documentary Series	Sarah Ferguson, Nial Fulton, Tony Jones	Won
Walkley Awards	Revelation	2020	Documentary Award	Sarah Ferguson, Nial Fulton, Tony Jones	Won
TV Week Logie Awards	7.30	2024	Best News or Public Affairs Presenter	Sarah Ferguson	Nominated
TV Week Logie Awards	7.30	2025	Best News or Public Affairs Presenter	Sarah Ferguson	Nominated
TV Week Logie Awards	7.30	2026	Ray Martin Award for Most Popular News or Public Affairs Presenter	Sarah Ferguson	Nominated

== Notes ==
Media offices
Preceded by Kerry O'Brien	Four Corners; Presenter; February 2016 – present	Succeeded by Incumbent
Preceded by Leigh Sales	7.30; Presenter; 2022–present	Succeeded by Incumbent
