= The Outlaw Michael Howe =

2013 TV film

- Film poster
- Written by: Brendan Cowell
- Directed by: Brendan Cowell
- Starring: Damon Herriman; Mirrah Foulkes; Matt Day; Darren Gilshenan
- Music by: Roger Mason
- Country of origin: Australia
- Original language: English

Production
- Producer: Nial Fulton
- Cinematography: Simon Harding
- Editor: Peter Crombie
- Running time: 77 minutes
- Production company: In Films

Original release
- Network: ABC
- Release: 1 December 2013

The Outlaw Michael Howe is a 2013 Australian historical drama film written and directed by Brendan Cowell. Set in the early 19th century, the film is based on the exploits of Michael Howe, an Englishman who was transported as a convict to the Australian penal colony of Van Diemen's Land (now Tasmania), where he achieved infamy as a bushranger and outlaw.

== Cast ==
- Damon Herriman as Michael Howe
- Mirrah Foulkes as Maria Lord
- Rarriwuy Hick as Mary
- Matt Day as Robert Knopwood
- Darren Gilshenan as Lieutenant Governor Thomas Davey
- Benedict Hardie as Peter Septon
- Pip Miller as Magistrate Humphrey
- Amanda Bishop as Susan
- Nicholas Cassim as Lieutenant Governor William Sorell
- Patrick Connolly as Carlisle
- Brendan Cowell as British soldier
- Steve Morris as Convict
- Blake Lindsell as British soldier
- Dean Gould as British soldier

== Filming ==
The film was shot on location in Tasmania, including Mount Field National Park. A large reconstruction of colonial Hobart was also built at Old Sydney Town in New South Wales.

== Music ==
Roger Mason composed the original score for The Outlaw Michael Howe. The soundtrack includes Sarah Blasko's song "A Truth", written and recorded exclusively for the film and featuring Warren Ellis. The Drones' song "How to See Through Fog" is also used in the film.

== Release ==
The film premiered on the ABC on 1 December 2013, and was released on DVD by Madman Entertainment.

== Awards ==
Award	Category	Result
AACTA Awards	Best Costume in Television	Nominated
Australian Production Guild Awards	Best Design on a Television Drama Award	Won
Australian Production Guild Awards	Best Costume in Television	Nominated
APRA Screen Music Awards 2014	Best Music in a Mini-series of Telemovie	Won
APRA Screen Music Awards 2014	Best Original Song composed for the screen	Nominated
Australian Cinematographers Society Awards 2014	Drama Silver Award	Won
Equity Ensemble Awards 2013	Outstanding Performance by an ensemble in a Telemovie or Series	Nominated
