= Hitting Home (TV series) =

Australian 2016 documentary series

- Genre: Documentary
- Directed by: Ivan O'Mahoney
- Presented by: Sarah Ferguson
- Composer: Roger Mason
- Country of origin: Australia
- Original language: English
- No. of seasons: 1
- No. of episodes: 2

Production
- Producer: Nial Fulton
- Production location: Australia
- Cinematography: Aaron Smith
- Editors: Andrew Cooke; Philippa Rowlands
- Production company: In Films

Original release
- Network: Australian Broadcasting Corporation
- Release: 2016

Hitting Home is a Walkley and AACTA winning television documentary series, consisting of two episodes, broadcast on ABC in November 2015. Presenter Sarah Ferguson reported on domestic violence in Australia.

== Concept ==
Following two years of research, journalist Sarah Ferguson spent six months reporting on domestic violence in Australia. To better understand the statistics of domestic violence, Nial Fulton and Ivan O'Mahoney, series producers of Hitting Home, spent nearly two years negotiating unprecedented access to specialised police domestic violence units, domestic violence courts and secured unprecedented access to new court safe-rooms for victims, women's refuges, a unique prison rehabilitation program and specialist forensic doctors. During pre-production, the producers worked alongside Corrective Services NSW, The NSW Justice Department, The NSW Police, Domestic Violence NSW, the NSW Coroner and many other agencies and peak bodies to ensure the safety of the participants. A comprehensive Duty of Care Statement was conceived, with the full support of all agencies.

=== Filming ===
In June 2015, production on Hitting Home began in the South Coast Correctional Centre (Nowra) on day 1 of a 10-week rehabilitation program aimed at preventing violent men from reoffending. After a very long process of negotiation and building trust, Ferguson and the producers convinced two of the inmates to appear on camera, fully identified. But before either inmate could appear on camera, the producers had to identify and seek permission from their respective victims. Both women agreed to tell their side of the story. Their interviews and police footage captured in the aftermath of the attack were incorporated into the series.

As part of the production of Hitting Home, Ferguson moved into a refuge in western Sydney. It was the first time in Australia a television crew was granted such access.

During the six months filming, Ferguson met many women who lived in the refuge, often with their young children. Ferguson convinced several victims to speak about their experiences on the documentary.

The production team worked closely with the NSW Police Domestic Violence Unit in Blacktown over the course of six months. Working with Sgt Genelle Warne and her team, Ferguson went on patrol, entered court safe rooms and met women in their own homes who had suffered violence at the hands of partners. The series was also able to capture the rolling out of new DV related procedures, including DVEC (Domestic Violence Evidence in Chief) - where police officers make a video recording of the victims statement in the immediate aftermath of their reported assault. Hitting Home featured the first time a DVEC gathering was captured on camera, when two officers apprehended a man who had badly beaten his wife in their car.

Access to domestic violence courts in Blacktown and Toronto was achieved with the support of NSW Justice Department. The production was allowed to bring cameras into both courts to film magistrates, victims and perpetrators and for the first time, show the new court safe-rooms in operation. Getting access to film in locals courts in Australia is extremely rare and allowed the production to highlight the challenges faced by victims, police and magistrates.

After speaking to a trauma councillor and the Homicide Victims Support Group, the producers reached out to Wendy Malonyay, the mother of Kate Malonyay, a young women murdered by her ex-boyfriend. Malonyay agreed to be interviewed for the series. To help tell the story of her daughters murder, the producers negotiated access to a homicide detectives training course, had a Non Publication Order on the Corners Report on the victim's death lifted and secured interviews with the State Coroner, the Investigating Police Officer and many of Kate's friends and family.

=== Music ===
The musical score to the series was composed by Roger Mason.

=== Post-production ===
Post-production on Hitting Home ran from June 2015 until November 2015. The series was edited at Spectrum Films at Fox Studios in Sydney. Andrew Cooke edited episode 1 and Philippa Rowlands edited episode 2. Andrew Cooke was nominated for an AACTA Award for his work on the series.

=== Q&A Special ===
Culminating on the UN International Day for the Elimination of Violence Against Women, episode 2 of Hitting Home was followed by a special edition of Q&A hosted by Julia Baird.

The Q&A Hitting Home Special featured Moo Baulch (Domestic Violence NSW), Christian Porter (Minister for Social Services), Nova Peris (Northern Territory Labor Senator), Mick Fuller (NSW Assistant Police Commissioner) and Professor Cathy Humphreys. It was hosted by Julia Baird and screened on 25 November 2015.

== Reception ==
The New South Wales Women's Court Advocacy Service reported a surge in women seeking help in the days after Hitting Home aired. Director of the service, Renata Field, said some shelters and counsellors had also reported a similar surge in victims calling for help. The National Domestic Violence hotline also reported a 44% increase in the week following the Hitting Home broadcast. On the day after the broadcast, there were 419 calls - over twice the national average.

=== Critical acclaim ===
Hitting Home received overwhelmingly positive reviews, with many commentators praising the courage of the victims of domestic violence for speaking so candidly about their experiences. With strong ratings and high social media activity, the program generated an extraordinary amount of coverage in the Australian press, significantly contributing to the wider national debate. Jane Caro of The Daily Telegraph wrote "'...this is compelling and important television. Ferguson and her team have done extraordinary work.'" Georgina Dent of Mamamia '..if you want to stem the tide of domestic violence, watching Hitting Home in its compelling and gritty entirety is the only place to start.'

Amanda Meade from The Guardian included Hitting Home as one of her top 10 hits of 2015. Hitting Home was selected by realscreen magazine's editorial team for their annual MIPTV Picks feature.

The series won many major Australian television awards, including the prestigious Walkley Documentary Award. The Walkley judges remarked: Hitting Home went beyond an excellent news/current affairs story. It both exploited the momentum at the time of broadcast around domestic violence and propelled the issue much further, engaging viewers in complexities of gender control and violence, viscerally confronting male perpetrators and showing impact on families. It revealed compassionately that domestic violence affects all classes of women. A powerful window into a national crisis and a call to arms.

=== Malonyay Apology ===
Following the broadcast of Hitting Home, an online petition was launched to demand the Royal Australian Navy apologise for granting Elliot Coulson, the man who murdered Kate Malonyay, a full military funeral following his suicide. The petition attracted over 10,000 signatures before the Vice-Admiral of the Royal Australian Navy Tim Barrett visited Wendy Malonyay and apologised in person. Following an ABC Lateline investigation, it was revealed that the Navy was wrong to grant Elliot Coulson a military funeral as he was AWOL at the time of his death. Following the Navy apology, Wendy Malonyay was invited to talk to the Navy's senior management about domestic violence on 28 January 2016.

=== Ratings ===
Episode 1 reached an audience of just below 1 million viewers. Hitting Home had the second highest iView ratings for an ABC factual program in 2015.

=== Accolades ===
Awards and nominations
Award	Date of ceremony	Category	Recipient(s)	Result	Ref(s)
AACTA Awards	5 December 2016	AACTA Award for Best Documentary	Sarah Ferguson, Nial Fulton, Ivan O'Mahoney	Won	
AACTA Awards	5 December 2016	AACTA Award for Best Editing in a Documentary	Andrew Cooke	Nominated	
Walkley Awards	2 December 2016	Documentary Award	Sarah Ferguson, Nial Fulton, Ivan O'Mahoney	Won	
Amnesty International Australia Media Awards	21 November 2016	Television Award	Sarah Ferguson, Nial Fulton, Ivan O'Mahoney	Won	
Screen Producers Australia	17 November 2016	Series Documentary Production	Sarah Ferguson, Nial Fulton, Ivan O'Mahoney	Nominated	
Our Watch Awards	14 September 2016	Best Longform	Sarah Ferguson, Nial Fulton, Ivan O'Mahoney	Won	
Australian Directors Guild Awards	6 May 2016	Best Direction in a Documentary Series	Ivan O'Mahoney	Won	
TV Week Logie Awards	7 May 2016	Most Outstanding Public Affairs Report	Sarah Ferguson, Nial Fulton, Ivan O'Mahoney	Nominated	
Kennedy Awards	7 May 2016	Outstanding Television Current Affairs Reporting	Sarah Ferguson, Nial Fulton, Ivan O'Mahoney	Nominated	
Kennedy Awards	7 May 2016	Outstanding Investigative Reporting	Sarah Ferguson, Nial Fulton, Ivan O'Mahoney	Nominated	
Australian Screen Editors	7 May 2016	Best Editing in a Documentary	Andrew Cooke	Nominated	

== See also ==
- Domestic Violence in Australia
- Domestic Violence
- Apprehended Violence Order
