= Dying Breed (film) =

- Theatrical film poster
- Directed by: Jody Dwyer
- Written by: Michael Boughen; Rod Morris
- Produced by: Michael Boughen; Rod Morris
- Starring: Leigh Whannell; Mirrah Foulkes; Nathan Phillips; Melanie Vallejo
- Cinematography: Geoffrey Hall
- Edited by: Mark Perry
- Music by: Nerida Tyson-Chew
- Production company: Ambience Entertainment
- Distributed by: Hoyts Distribution
- Release date: 26 April 2008 (Tribeca Film Festival)
- Running time: 91 minutes
- Country: Australia
- Language: English

Dying Breed is a 2008 Australian horror film that was directed by Jody Dwyer and stars Leigh Whannell and Nathan Phillips.

== Plot ==
The film opens in Tasmania in the 1800s. Alexander Pearce, a convict known as "the Pieman", has escaped into the wilderness, and he is being hunted by policemen with dogs. He is faced by a policeman who attempts to shoot Pearce, but his gun does not fire. Pearce then bites the policeman's neck, taking a large chunk from his throat, killing him, allowing Pearce to escape. In his escape, he is confronted with a Tasmanian tiger, whom he staves off by kicking a piece of the policeman over to the predator to eat.

Today, Nina plans a trip with her boyfriend Matt to Tasmania to find the supposedly extinct Tasmanian tiger. Her endeavor is encouraged by a paw print that was discovered by her older sister in a remote area of the island before her body was mysteriously found in the Pieman River several years before. Matt's friend, Jack, and his girlfriend, Rebecca, help pay for the trip and accompany the couple. When they arrive, Matt sees a small girl on the boat playing a game with yellow-tinted teeth. When Matt asks what she is doing, she recites a rhyme, then bites Matt's hand. They spend a night in a dingy motel located next to a meat pie factory, meeting the eccentric and creepy locals.

The next day, the group goes out on a boat on the river through the forest. They decide to camp in a cave out in the woods, and later that evening, Matt and Nina discover one of the Tasmanian tigers creeping through the bush. Nina rushes to get her camera to take a picture of the marsupial, but it has run into the woods. The group goes into the dark after the animal, using their cell phones as light, because capturing proof of its existence is critical to Nina's research. Unbeknownst to the rest of the group, Rebecca is captured and eaten by a cannibal. When the other three re-group, they realize that Rebecca is missing and that Nina has blood on her pant legs.

Desperate to find Rebecca, the group searches through the forest. The local ferryman tries to help them but is murdered by one of the cannibals. Reaching an old mining site, they find Rebecca's remains strung up on meat-hooks, and Jack is killed by an animal trap. Matt flees underground and finds grisly evidence of the cannibal's past exploits. Nina reaches a railway bridge over a fast-flowing river but is cornered by a pair of cannibals. She deliberately throws herself off the high bridge. The ferryman's wife then kills one of the cannibals and then slits her own throat after apologizing to Matt. That night, the police arrive at the hotel, but there is no sign of any of the missing people. As the police depart, a sad and weary Matt prepares to leave, but is suddenly attacked.

He is later seen paralyzed in a chair while one of the cannibals explains that their settlement, much like the Tasmanian tiger, must stay hidden to survive. The cannibal then opens a door, exposing a still-living Nina tied to a table, about to be raped for breeding purposes. While Matt watches, the young girl, who is actually Nina's niece, approaches him and removes a set of dentures, exposing sharp, deformed teeth. As the police drive away, Nina's mobile phone (which Matt had given them) displays a photo of the Tasmanian Tiger.

== Cast ==
- Sheridan Harvey as Katie
- Bille Brown as Harvey
- Peter Docker as Alexander Pierce
- Brendan Donoghue as Gareth
- Mirrah Foulkes as Nina
- Elaine Hudson as Ethel
- Sally McDonald as Ruth
- Nathan Phillips as Jack
- Ken Radley as Liam
- Melanie Vallejo as Rebecca
- Leigh Whannell as Matt
- Steven Haar as Mechanic

== Release ==
Dying Breed premiered on 26 April 2008 at Tribeca Film Festival. The cinema release was originally planned for 14 August, but was changed to 6 November 2008. It is rated MA15+ for Strong Horror Violence and Sex Scene, Blood and Gore. It was part of the third After Dark Horrorfest in 2009.

In Australia, one of the posters was banned, due to the "gruesome" picture; however, the poster was still allowed to be shown in cinema foyers, and online.

=== Box office ===
In its first weekend in Australia it was ranked #11 making A$220,878 across 113 cinemas. The film did poorly in the Australian box office, and made $525,384.

=== Home media ===
In Australia, the DVD was released during 8 April 2009. There are three different DVD covers that are available. The first features a meat pie, broken open with human organs inside. The second features four characters on the top, and the bottom is a woman running through woods. The third cover features a man being held by an elderly man. Special Features on all editions include:

- 40-minute behind the scenes featurette
- Audio Commentary with Director, Producer, Writer
- Theatrical Trailers
- Deleted Scene
- Cast Interviews

== Reception ==
Rotten Tomatoes gives it a 50% rotten rating based on 10 reviews, with an average rating of 4.8/10. Dreadcentral.com gave the film 4/5 stars, while Urbancinefile.com.au also gave it a positive review. Critics Margaret Pomeranz and David Stratton, however, gave the film negative reviews. On their show At the Movies, they rated Dying Breed at 2/5 stars and 1.5/5 stars respectively. Stratton said "It tries hard to be horrific and gruesome, even introducing a bit of fashionable torture near the end, but only the most credulous will find it genuinely scary."

== See also ==
- Cinema of Australia
