= Coral Shaw =

New Zealand retired judge (born 1947)

Dame Coral Shaw DNZM
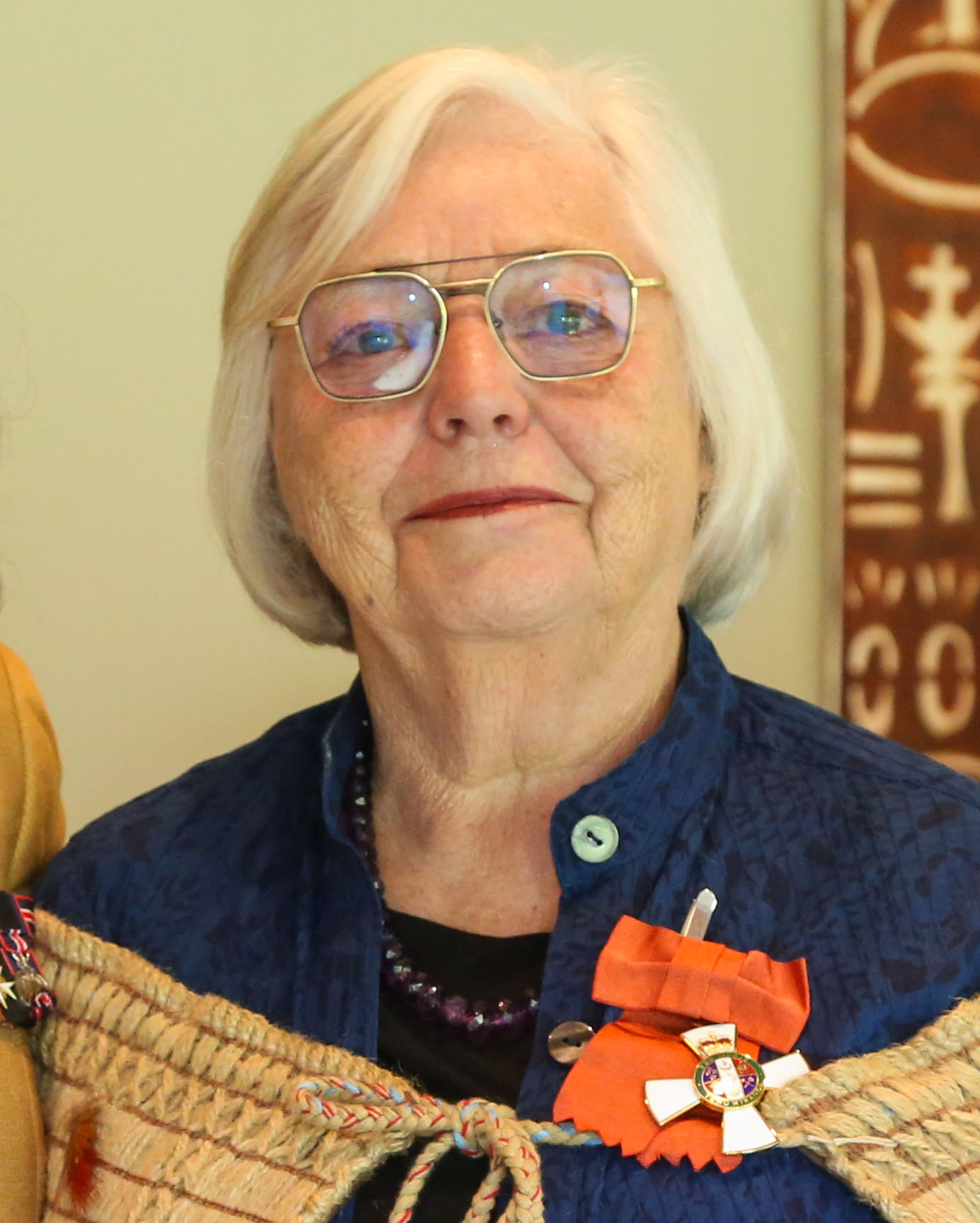
- Shaw in 2026

UN Dispute Tribunal judge
- In office 2009–2016

Employment Court judge
- In office 1999–2009

District Court judge
- In office 1992–1999

Personal details
- Born: Coral May Dodds; 1947 (age 78–79)
- Education: University of Canterbury; University of Auckland

Dame Coral May Shaw DNZM (née Dodds; born 1947) is a New Zealand retired judge. Shaw chaired the Royal Commission of Inquiry into Historical Abuse in State Care and in the Care of Faith-based Institutions. In the 2026 New Year Honours, she was appointed a Dame Companion of the New Zealand Order of Merit.

== Early life and education ==
Shaw was born in 1947, the daughter of Wilson and May Dodds. She grew up in Lyttelton, where her parents owned a drapery. She was educated at Lyttelton Main School, where she was dux in 1959, and Christchurch Girls' High School, and then spent a year volunteering in the Solomon Islands, before going to university. She was the first in her family to get a university degree, earning a Bachelor of Arts from the University of Canterbury in 1969, and then trained and worked as a teacher. Shaw completed a law degree at the University of Auckland, and worked as a Crown solicitor.

== Career ==
From 1992 to 1999, Shaw was a District Court judge in West Auckland, where she introduced a fast-track system for family violence cases and established the WAVES Trust system that coordinates services for both victims and offenders, and developed several judicial education programmes. She also introduced restorative justice processes, working with Hoani Waititi Marae.

In 1999, Shaw became the first woman to be appointed a judge of the Employment Court, serving until 2009. In 2009, she was appointed a judge of the United Nations Dispute Tribunal, and served in that role until 2016.

Shaw led reviews of Fire and Emergency New Zealand and of the Human Rights Commission. She chaired the Royal Commission of Inquiry into Historical Abuse in State Care and in the Care of Faith-based Institutions from 2019 to 2024.

== Honours and awards ==
In the 2026 New Year Honours, Shaw was appointed a Dame Companion of the New Zealand Order of Merit, "for services to public service, the judiciary and the community". When interviewed on the radio about the honour, Shaw took the opportunity to announce her second retirement. She had previously tried to retire before being appointed to the Royal Commission of Inquiry into Historical Abuse in Care.
