= Convicts on the West Coast of Tasmania =

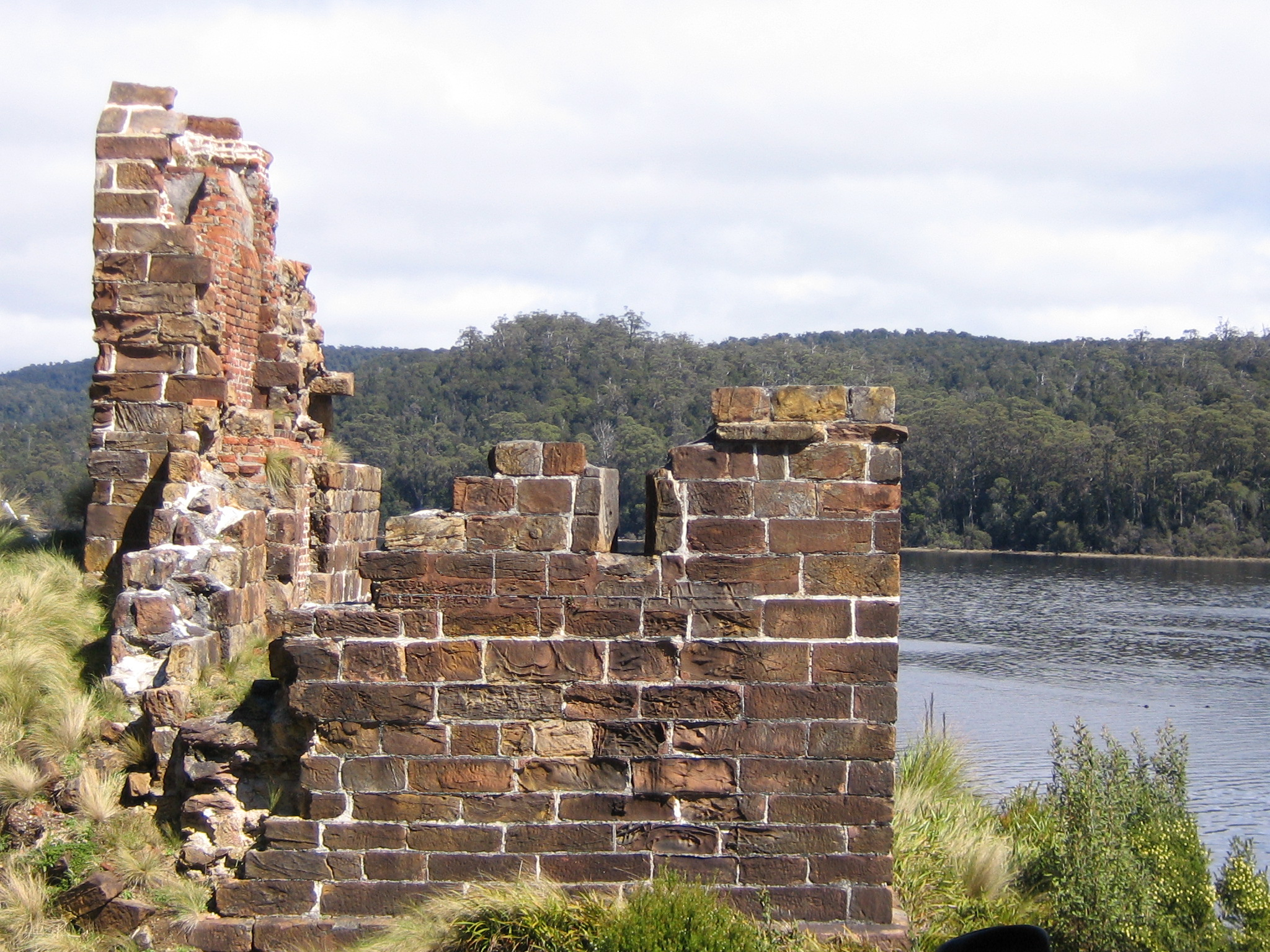
The remains of the stone penitentiary building on Sarah Island at the Macquarie Harbour Penal Station

The West Coast of Tasmania has a significant convict heritage. The use of the west coast as an outpost to house convicts in isolated penal settlements occurred in the eras 1822–33, and 1846–47.

The main locations were Sarah Island (known by many in the late twentieth century as Settlement Island) and Grummet Island in Macquarie Harbour. The entrance to Macquarie Harbour was known as Hells Gates and the play on this name has travelled from its naming in the 1830s to Paul Collins's book published in 2002.

Convict parties used the land around the harbour as a work area as far as Gordon River. The prison's existence was for only 15 years, but its hold on the imagination has spawned a significant literature.

== Physical heritage ==
While most physical traces of the convict era were abandoned or lost, many foundations and outlines of the buildings of the settlement can still be seen. Sarah Island was allegedly vandalised for building materials in the 1890s by mining communities. However, enough remains that guided tours of the island can still give a vivid and moving glimpse into the lives of the convicts and their keepers, and the huge amount of building and land reclamation that took place during the relatively short life of the prison. Piners also have periodically discovered convict era items during their work along the rivers and shore of Macquarie Harbour.

== Frederick ==
Frederick was a merchant ship stolen in 1834 by escaping convicts from Sarah Island. It has inspired several books and a play.

The Ship that Never Was, by the Round Earth Theatre Company, at the Strahan Visitor Centre, in Strahan, is a long-running play about a successful escape. It was written by Richard Davey, a descendant of Governor Davey who worked on Sarah Island as a guide and researcher. He has also written The Sarah Island Conspiracies — an account of twelve voyages to Macquarie Harbour and Sarah Island (Hobart, 2002) and two pamphlets — a narrative of the event the play was based on and "Sarah Island - The People, Ships and shipwrights — a guided tour". Collins refers to Davey in his Hell's Gates book.

The Ship Thieves by Sian Rees focuses upon James Porter one of the group of convicts on Frederick, and manuscripts found in the Dixson Library in Sydney. Rees had previously written about a very different ship of convicts — Lady Juliana.

== Fiction ==
- For the Term of his Natural Life, Marcus Clarke
- Gould's Book of Fish, Richard Flanagan

== Film ==
- The Last Confession of Alexander Pearce

== See also ==
- Convictism in Australia
- Convict era of Western Australia
- Port Arthur, Tasmania
- William Buelow Gould

== Bibliography ==
- Butler, Richard. The Men That God Forgot. London, 1977 ISBN 0-552-10469-8
- Brand, Ian. Sarah Island Penal Settlements 1822-1833 and 1846-1847. Launceston, 1984. ISBN 0-949457-31-0
- Collins, Paul. Hell's Gates/ The terrible journey of Alexander Pearce, Van Diemen's Land cannibal. South Yarra, 2002. ISBN 1-74064-083-7
- Davey, Richard Innes. The Sarah Island Conspiracies. Hobart, 2002. ISBN 0-9750051-0-3
- Flanagan, Richard. Gould's Book of Fish Sydney, 2001. ISBN 0-330-36378-6
- Julen, Hans. The Penal Settlement of Macquarie Harbour Launceston, 1976. ISBN 0-9599207-3-0
- Pearn, John. "Sarah Island/The infamous prison island in Macquarie Harbour", Van Dieman's Land. Chapter 1 of:
  - Pearn, John and Carter, Peggy. Editors. Islands of Incarceration/ Convict and Quarantine Islands of the Australian Coast by Seven Authors. Brisbane, 1995. ISBN 0-86776-599-2
- Pink, Kerry.G. Through Hells Gates/ A History of Strahan and Macquarie Harbour. Strahan, 1984. ISBN 0-646-36665-3 Chapter 3: Macquarie Harbour: Convicts' Hell
- Porter, James. (1981) The capture of the Frederick, Macquarie Harbour Van Diemen’s Land 1834 Adelaide : Sullivan’s Cove. ISBN 0-909442-19-3
- Rees, Siân . The Ship Thieves. London: Aurum Press. 2006. ISBN 1-84513-140-1
- Whitham, Charles (2003). Western Tasmania - A land of riches and beauty (Reprint 2003 ed.). Queenstown: Municipality of Queenstown.

2003 edition — Queenstown: Municipality of Queenstown.
1949 edition — Hobart: Davies Brothers. OCLC 48825404; ASIN B000FMPZ80
1924 edition — Queenstown: Mount Lyell Tourist Association. OCLC 35070001; ASIN B0008BM4XC

  - notably the 'Account of Macquarie Harbour' by T.G. Lempriere from the Tasmanian Journal of natural Science of 1842–6 on pages 39–46 of Charles Whitham
