= For the Term of His Natural Life (miniseries) =

- Based on: For the Term of His Natural Life by Marcus Clarke
- Written by: Patricia Payne; Wilton Schiller
- Directed by: Rob Stewart
- Starring: Colin Friels; Susan Lyons; Robert Coleby
- Music by: Simon Walker
- Country of origin: Australia
- Original language: English
- No. of episodes: 3 x 2 hours

Production
- Producers: Patricia Payne; Wilton Schiller
- Cinematography: Ernie Clark
- Editors: Wayne LeClos; Philip Reid
- Production company: Filmco
- Budget: $4 million, $5 million or $6.5 million

Original release
- Network: Nine Network
- Release: 23 May – 6 June 1983

For the Term of His Natural Life is a 1983 Australian three-part, six-hour television miniseries based on the classic 1874 novel of the same name by Marcus Clarke. Each episode aired for two hours on Nine Network on 23 May, 30 May and 6 June 1983.

== Plot ==
Well-educated but adventurous young British aristocrat, Richard Devine, son of Sir Richard Devine, learns his mother's secret – his biological father is in fact Lord Bellasis. To protect his mother's reputation, he leaves home to take ship to India, but is arrested after Lord Bellasis is murdered. He is tried for murder and acquitted but found guilty of theft of a pocket-watch which was given him by Lord Bellasis. Under the alias of Rufus Dawes (Colin Friels), he is sentenced to transportation for life.

Dawes is shipped to Van Diemen's Land on the Malabar, which also carries Captain Vickers (Patrick Macnee) who is to become the new commandant of the penal settlement at Macquarie Harbour, his wife Julia (Samantha Eggar) and child Sylvia, Julia's maid, Sarah Purfoy (Susan Lyons) and Lieutenant Maurice Frere (Rod Mullinar). During the voyage, Dawes starts to tutor an illiterate young convict boy, known as ‘Blinker’, in the basics of arithmetic.

Life is brutal for the convicts. Vickers tries to be relatively humane but Frere goes out of his way to be as brutal as possible. Because of his gardening knowledge, learned at the family home, Dawes is assigned to create and maintain a garden around the commandant's house.

Dawes is transferred to Port Arthur, under Frere's command. As punishment for being involved in an attempt to escape, he is sent into solitary confinement on Grummet rock, a small island off the coast. Dawes manages to escape and is washed up on a beach, where he finds Frere, Mrs Vickers and Sylvia, who have been marooned there by escaped convicts. Dawes plans, and succeeds in building, a boat out of saplings and goat hide. Frere promises Dawes a pardon if they are saved. Sylvia calls him, "Good Mr. Dawes". They take to sea and are rescued by an American vessel, but Frere has Dawes arrested. Sylvia has blocked out all memory of the events and cannot defend Dawes. Mrs. Vickers dies.

Sylvia, now a young woman of sixteen, marries Frere, who has lied about the events and painted Dawes as a would-be murderer.

Dawes escapes again to see Sylvia, but in her amnesia she is afraid of him. John Rex (Robert Coleby), another convict, tries to persuade Dawes to join him in an escape. Rex reaches Sydney and travels on to London with Sarah, now his wife, where he presents himself as Richard Devine. Lady Ellinor Devine, Richard's mother, accepts him as her long-lost son.

In Norfolk Island, by 1846, Reverend James North has been appointed prison chaplain. He is appalled at the horrible punishments inflicted. and also has strong feelings for Sylvia.

John Rex leads a life of debauchery, much to the disapproval of Lady Ellinor (Diane Cilento) and wishes to sell off the family estate. Lady Ellinor's suspicions have reached the point where she attempts to test her alleged son's knowledge of family secrets.

North visits Dawes in prison where he has been sentenced to death by Frere; he changes places with him and Dawes takes ship to Sydney without being discovered. He makes his way to the gold diggings at Ballarat, opening a general goods store. But Frere, now posted to Melbourne, tracks him down with the aid of a lawyer. The lawyer proves to be ‘Blinker’ now well educated, and Frere is shot dead.

Dawes travels to his home and is accepted by his Mother. Rex and his wife, now exposed as frauds, vanish into the night. Vickers arrives and hands Dawes a pardon, having personally lobbied on his behalf. It is assumed that Dawes and Sylvia will now marry.

== Cast ==
Major characters

- Anthony Perkins as Reverend James North
- Patrick Macnee as Major John Vickers
- Samantha Eggar as Julie Vickers
- Diane Cilento as Lady Elinor Devine
- Rod Mullinar as Lieutenant Maurice Frere
- Robert Coleby as John Rex
- Susan Lyons as Sarah Purfoy
- Penelope Stewart as Sylvia Vickers (as an adult)
  - Rebe Taylor as Sylvia Vickers (as a child)
- Colin Friels as Richard Devine ("Rufus Dawes")

Secondary cast

- Johnny Johnstone as Matthew Gabbett
- John Turnbull as Jemmy Vetch
- Barry Lovett as Captain Blunt
- Ron Parry as Doctor Pine
- Leo Taylor as Lord Bellasis
- Damon Herriman as Blinker
- John Trinder as Jarvis
- David Burchell as Sir Richard Devine
- John Heywood as Constable
- Wendy Strehlow as Jenny
- Alan Lovett as Toby
- Barry Solomon as Miles
- Brian Debnam as Grimes
- Donald McDonald as Reverend Meekin
- Reg Lye as Blind Mooney
- Henry Salter as Warder Troke
- Glynn Nicholas as Kirkland
- David Winston as Shiers
- Geoff Pullan as Judge Hobart Town
- Jimmy Jenkins as Mackelwain
- Richard Potter as Jones
- Damon Sanders as Quincy
- Anna Maria Monticelli as Alicia
- Selwyn Crockett as Willis
- John Dick as Francis Wade
- Jon Nicholls as Hardy
- Patrick Frost as Collins
- Johnathon Leigh as Randolph
- Peter Goerecke as Reasin
- Hedley Cullen as Toddy
- Drummond Jewitt as Sailor Johnson
- Warwick Cooper as Loftus
- Brenton Whittle as Captain Best

== Production ==
The mini-series was based on the original serialised version of the novel For the Term of His Natural Life, which meant it featured scenes of Rufus Dawes in the Australian Gold Rush and a happy ending where Dawes is reunited with Sylvia.

The mini series was a passion project for Patricia Payne, who had wanted to adapt the novel since she read it in high school. She had been an assistant to Harry Wren, then moved to the US and Canada where she had worked as a casting agent, writer and producer.

Payne spent several years raising the budget, which almost entirely consisted of private investment raised through Filmco rather than pre-sales. (Payne estimated there were 147 investors arranged by Filmco, attracted by tax conessions. The Australian Film Commission contributed to script development. It was the highest budget ever for an Australian mini-series.

Payne's co producer was Wilton Schiller, an American with extensive TV experience, who was her husband. Shooting began before the series had been sold to an Australian network.

Filming began in October 1981. It was shot partly in Adelaide, Victor Harbor, Macquarie Harbour and Port Arthur.

The series was an early lead role for Colin Friels who had made only two films, Hoodwink and Monkey Grip.

An interactive app based on the mini series was released in 2012.

== Release ==
The show sold to Channel Nine for $900,000.

=== Ratings ===
It was a ratings success. It was the eleventh highest rated Australian mini series on Sydney television between 1978 and 2000, with a rating of 37. It was the third highest on Melbourne television during that period with a rating of 45. Another account gave its share at 40%.

=== Critical ===
The Sun Herald called it "a disappointment. It's glossy and expensive looking with good sets and costuming but the pace lags at times and there's a sense of unevenness about it."

The Age said it was "a highly watchable chunk of television."

The film was one of four movies made by Filmco that were part of a legal action in 1985. A judge ordered eight Sydney stockbrokers to repay at least $615,000 to which they borrowed in 1981 to finance four films by Filmco: Early Frost (budget $1 million), The Dark Room ($1.1 million), For the Term of His Natural Life ($4 million) and A Dangerous Summer ($2.9 million). The films were not box office successes and the stock brokers refused to repay the loans when they matured in November 1983.

== United Kingdom release ==
It aired in the United Kingdom in 1985, where the Guardian headlined its review "fair stinkum".

== Soundtrack albums ==
The music score for this series by Simon Walker was released as soundtrack albums in 1988 by 1M1 Records (1M1CD1001) and in 2019 by Dragon's Domain Records (DDR661).
