= Richard Davey =

Australian actor and director

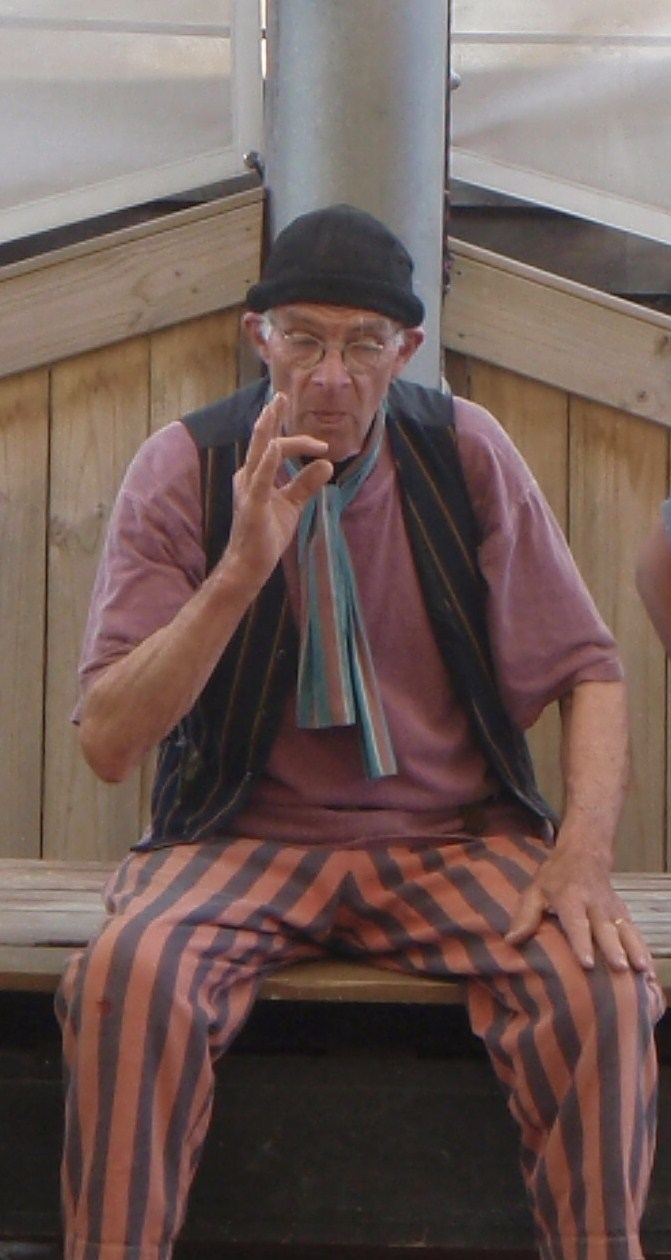
- Richard Innes Davey – in mid scene of "The Ship That Never Was"
- Born: Richard Innes Davey; 4 November 1938
- Died: 13 March 2013 (aged 74)
- Occupations: Actor, playwright
- Years active: 1958–2013

Richard Innes Davey (4 November 1938 – 13 March 2013) was an Australian actor, director and writer. He was the founder of the Round Earth Company and advocate for the understanding of the Macquarie Harbour Penal Station on Sarah Island on the West Coast of Tasmania.

Earlier he had been artistic director of The Hole in the Wall Theatre in Perth, Western Australia from 1969 -1971.

== Work ==
Over ten years of the Round Earth Theatre Company at Strahan, and work on Sarah Island as a guide, Davey's work has had significance in helping tourists understand the penal station and its context, where previously there had been scattered and not very accessible research. The Ship That Never Was, written by Davey, is Australia's longest-running play, with over 5,000 performances and continuing to be performed nightly at Strahan; it is about the Frederick escape, the successful escape of 10 convicts from Sarah Island to Chile.

His book The Sarah Island Conspiracies: Being an account of twelve voyages to Macquarie Harbour and Sarah Island, which was short listed for a major prize in Hobart in 2005, complements the work of Richard Flanagan's Gould's Book of Fish. They both use the painting by William Buelow Gould of the Weedy sea dragon on the covers of their books.

Davey's long lasting interest in Shakespeare's King Lear saw production in November 2007 of an adaptation The Madness of King Lear in Hobart, Tasmania.

Davey died on 13 March 2013 after a long battle with illness.

== See also ==
- Convicts on the West Coast of Tasmania
- Macquarie Harbour

== Audio recordings ==
- Davey, Richard (2009), Richard Davey interviewed by Rob Willis in the Rob Willis folklore collection

== Plays ==
- (1982) Tell 'em you're Maoris (Put Your Boots On)
- (1983) Broken Dreams
- (1984) The Ship That Never Was
- (1984) Hallelujah Lady Jane
- (1986) Guarding the Perimeter
- (1986) Scapegoats
- (1986) A Cry From The Heart
- (1986) The Catfish that cried
- (1986) Hook's Mountain
- (1995) A Bright and Crimson Flower
- (2004) The Case Of The Missing Rations

== Books ==
- Davey, Richard (1984), Don't park your swan on the grass, Salamanca Theatre Company
- Davey, Richard; Pigot, Neil; Davey, Anita (1993), A bright and crimson flower, Crimson Flower Project
- Davey, Richard, (2002) The Sarah Island conspiracies : being an account of twelve voyages made by one G.K. to Macquarie Harbour on the western coast of Van Diemens Land 1822–1833 Strahan, Tas. : Round Earth Co., ISBN 0-9750051-0-3 (Reproduction of a memoir dated 1896 authored by an anonymous clerk G.K. )
