= Wilton Schiller =

American producer and screenwriter

- Born: July 24, 1919; Chicago, Illinois, U.S.
- Died: July 27, 2014 (aged 95); Studio City, California, U.S.
- Education: University of Chicago
- Occupation(s): Producer, screenwriter
- Spouse: Patricia Payne

Wilton Schiller (July 24, 1919 – July 27, 2014) was an American producer and screenwriter. He produced the last season of the American crime drama television series The Fugitive.

== Career ==
Schiller started his career, as screenwriting on radio and performing comedy, after graduating from University of Chicago.

In 1950s–1960s, Schiller wrote episodes of several television programs, including, Lassie, Have Gun -- Will Travel, The Millionaire, Dragnet, Man with a Camera, M Squad, Leave It to Beaver and Rawhide.

In 1960s–1970s, Schiller became a producer on the medical drama Ben Casey for 26 episodes. He produced Mannix for the first season. He also screenplayed the 1964 film The New Interns and taught screenwriting at University of California. Schiller became producer for the crime drama television series The Fugitive in 1966, replacing producer Alan Armer.

In the 1970s–1980s, Schiller pioneered co-productions on the Canadian medical drama Dr. Simon Locke, which is also named Police Surgeon. In 1979, he wrote the television film Captain America II: Death Too Soon with his wife, Patricia.

In 1983, Schiller wrote and was the executive producer for the miniseries For the Term of his Natural Life, which was based on the 1870 story For the Term of his Natural Life, written by Marcus Clarke.

== Death ==
Schiller died July 2014 of heart failure at his home in Studio City, California, at the age of 95.
