= Frederick escape =

1834 ship escape by convicts

The Frederick escape was an 1834 incident in which the brig Frederick was hijacked by ten Australian convicts and used to abscond to Chile, where they lived freely for two years. Four of the convicts were later recaptured and returned to Australia, where they escaped the death sentence for piracy through a legal technicality.

== Construction and theft ==
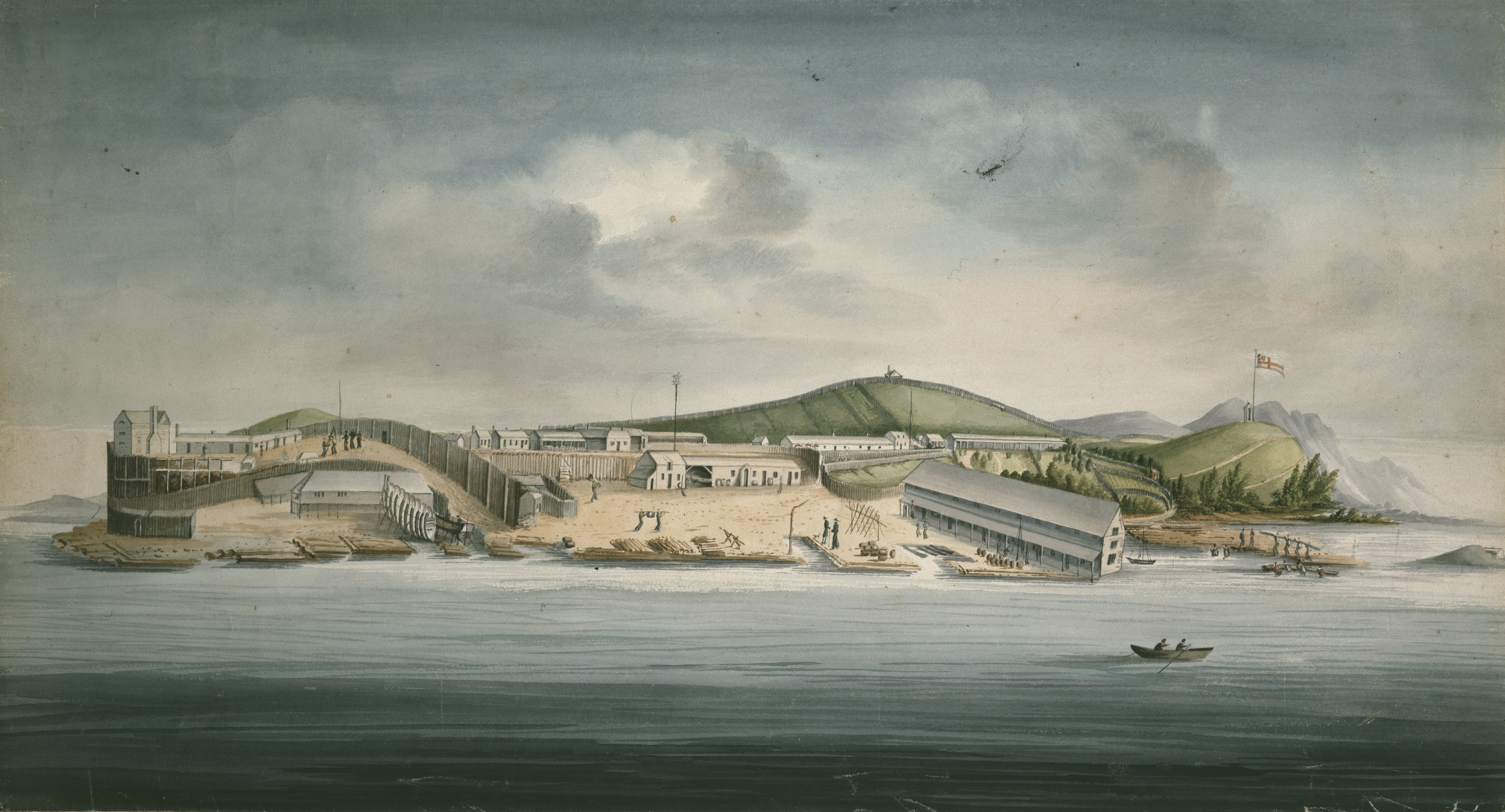
Macquarie Harbour Penal Station, depicted by convict artist William Buelow Gould, 1833

Frederick was the last vessel to be constructed in the shipyards at the Macquarie Harbour Penal Station on Sarah Island, Tasmania. In 1833 the penal station was being closed down and its convicts transferred to Port Arthur; in the closing months of the year only about a dozen convicts remained on Sarah Island, completing the construction of the brig.

Four of the convicts were former sailors, and had been sent to Sarah Island (a prison colony within the larger prison colony of Van Diemen's Land) because of their history of previous failed escape attempts. Among them was Londoner James Porter, a former whaler who had previously lived in Chile and left a wife and child there, before returning to England and then being transported to Australia for the theft of silks.

On 14 January 1834, ten of the convicts, led by Porter, seized the opportunity to escape by hijacking the Frederick. After overpowering their skeleton guard of jailers they left them on shore with provisions, cognizant of the fact that the ill-treatment of overpowered jailers during the Cyprus mutiny had been a factor in the harsh punishment of those mutineers when they were subsequently captured.

The convicts then sailed across the South Pacific, arriving on February 25 near the mouth of the Bueno River, Chile. They scuttled the Frederick off-shore, travelled the remaining miles in the ship's tender, and passed themselves off in Valdivia as survivors of a shipwreck.

== Chile ==
The governor of Valdivia was suspicious of the convicts' claims, and intended to have them executed as pirates before changing his heart after an impassioned speech by Porter—though both Robert Hughes and Richard Davey cast doubt on this event, noting that Porter's account is the only record of it. The convicts were permitted to remain in Chile, though some left for the United States or Jamaica.

== Recapture ==
Two years later, in 1836, the governor of Valdivia was replaced. His successor was more suspicious of the British convicts and alerted the passing frigate HMS Blonde. Four escapees—James Porter, William Shires, Charles Lyon and William Cheshire—were then arrested and shipped back to England, and subsequently Hobart.

== Trial and reimprisonment ==
The escapees arrived back in Hobart in March 1837 and were put on trial for piracy—a hanging offence. This caused a considerable public spectacle in the settlement, and the court was packed for the trial. James Porter and William Shires argued that as the Frederick had not yet been officially launched, it was impossible for them to have committed piracy: "It was canvas, rope, boarding and trenails, put together shipwise—yet it was not a legal ship; the seizure might have been theft, but not piracy." The situation was further complicated by the Frederick having been taken in a harbour rather than on the high seas, a requisite for piracy.

Ultimately Porter and the others were found guilty of piracy, but not sentenced to death. Porter later alleged that the trial took only half an hour. The convicts were imprisoned for two years in a Hobart jail, then transported to the notorious Norfolk Island penal colony, where Porter wrote his memoirs under the governorship of the prison reformer Alexander Maconochie.

Porter's sentence on Norfolk Island was reduced after he rescued several officers when their boat capsized. He was later released from the harsh conditions of Norfolk Island and sent to Newcastle. In 1847 he again escaped, and was never heard from again.

== Popular culture ==
The Frederick escape is the subject of The Ship That Never Was, Australia's longest-running play, a pantomime performed every evening by the Round Earth Theatre Company in Strahan, Tasmania.

== See also ==
- Catalpa rescue
- Cyprus mutiny
