= Macquarie Harbour Penal Station =

Former convict colony on Sarah Island, Tasmania

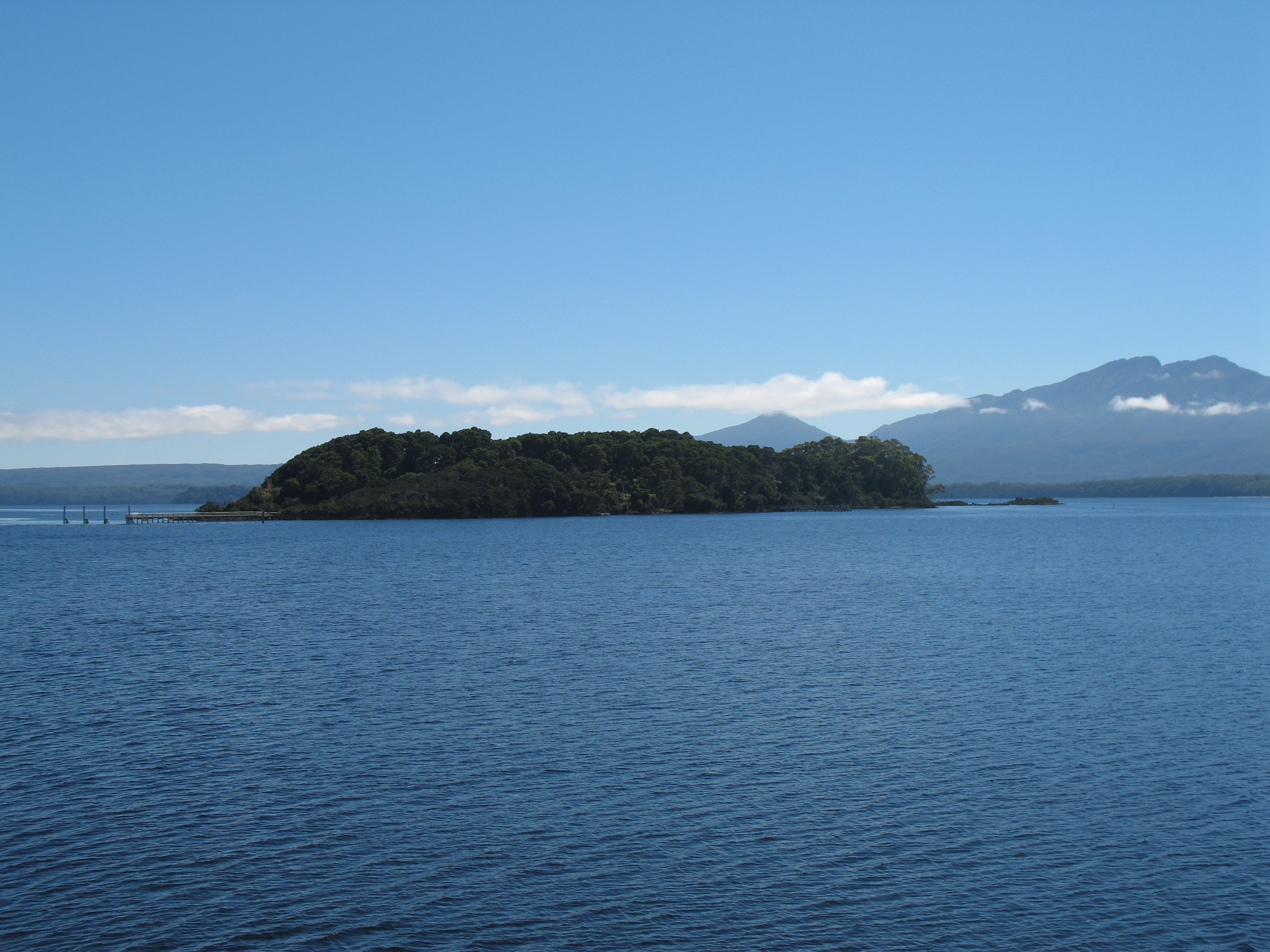
- Sarah Island in Macquarie Harbour
- Interactive map of Macquarie Harbour Penal Station
- Location: Macquarie Harbour, Tasmania.; 42°23′16″S 145°26′55″E
- Status: Abandoned
- Security class: Penal colony
- Opened: 1822
- Closed: 1833
- Managed by: British Government
- Governor: Lt Governor William Sorell (1822–24); Lt Governor George Arthur (1824–33)

The Macquarie Harbour Penal Station, a former British colonial penal settlement, established on Sarah Island, Macquarie Harbour, in the former Penal colony of Van Diemen's Land, now Tasmania, operated between 1822 and 1833. The settlement housed male convicts, with a small number of women housed on a nearby island. During its 11 years of operation, the penal colony achieved a reputation as one of the harshest penal settlements in the Australian colonies. The former penal station is located on the eight-hectare (twenty-acre) Sarah Island that now operates as a historic site under the direction of the Tasmania Parks and Wildlife Service.

== Rationale for establishment ==
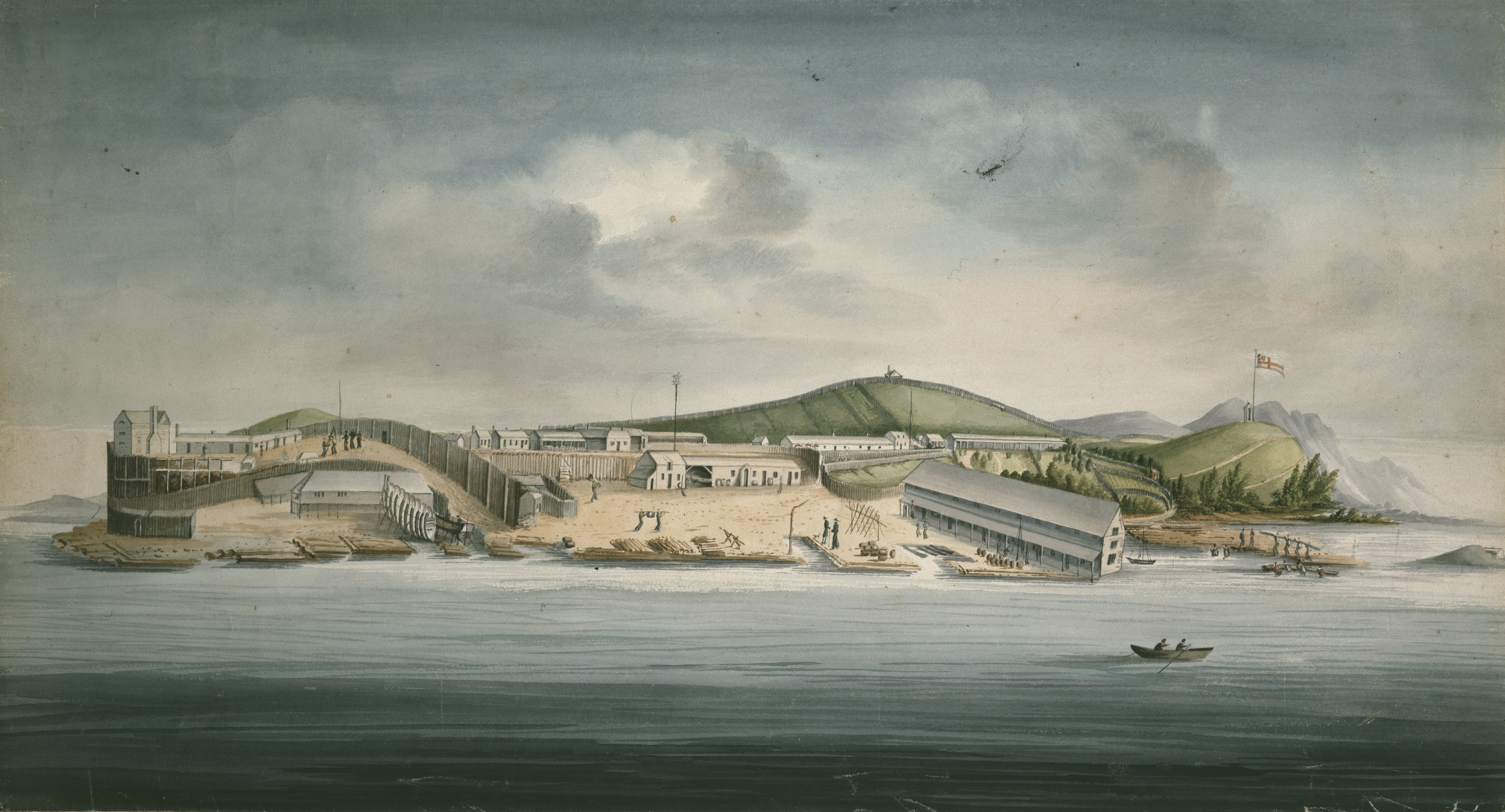
North east view of Macquarie Harbour penal settlement, Sarah Island, Tasmania, 1833

The penal station was established as a place of banishment within the Australian colonies. It took the worst convicts, those who had reoffended and those who had escaped from other settlements. The isolated land was ideally suited for its purpose. It was separated from the mainland by the wide expanse of river, surrounded by a mountainous wilderness and was hundreds of miles away from the colony's other settled areas. The only seaward access was through a treacherous narrow channel known as Hells Gates.

Strong tidal currents resulted in the deaths of many convicts before they even reached the settlement owing to ships foundering in the narrow rocky channel. The surveyor who mapped Sarah Island concluded that the chances of escape were "next to impossible". Neighbouring Grummet Island, a small island to the Northeast, was used for solitary confinement.

Lieutenant-Governor William Sorell wanted the new penal colony to be economically viable. It could then reimburse the British government for the expense of its establishment. The island was cleared soon after the arrival of the convicts and their Governor. However, this exposed the settlement to the howling gales of the roaring forties, so it was necessary to build a wall from Huon pine to provide shelter. Convicts spent most of their waking hours, often up to their necks in water, cutting timber and preparing it for rafting down the river. Lashings were common and were to be administered by another convict. If they were not administered with sufficient severity, the convict who had been given responsibility for administering the lashes was also lashed. The severity of the lashings was sufficient to cause death in some cases. If a convict appeared in danger of death, a doctor could intervene, the lashing would cease (for a time) and be resumed once the convict was deemed to have recovered sufficiently for it to continue. After a time, a Scottish shipbuilder named David Hoy, who had heard of the remarkable properties of Huon pine for shipbuilding came, voluntarily, to the island. He negotiated with the convicts, allowing them rations of rum and tobacco, and more weatherproof sleeping quarters in exchange for their cooperation. For a short period, it was the largest shipbuilding operation in the Australian colonies. Chained convicts had the task of cutting down Huon pine trees and rafting the logs down the river.

=== Military Personnel ===
Once the establishment of the penal station at Macquarie Harbour was decided upon, Lieutenant John Cuthbertson of the 48th Regiment was appointed as its commandant, magistrate and justice of the peace on 8 December 1821. Four days later he left Hobart with Captain James Kelly, harbourmaster, Surveyor George Evans and Surgeon Spence in the Sophia, accompanied by some 16 soldiers, their wives and children and 66 male and 8 female convicts in the Prince Leopold. Advice of his arrival and of the choice of Sarah Island for the headquarters of the new settlement was sent on 23 January 1822. Sergeant George Waddy of the 48th Regiment was Commissariat Sergeant and second in command of the experimental penal settlement in 1821. His youngest child Jane Waddy was born on Sarah Island in 1822.

=== Conditions ===
As Sarah Island could not produce food, malnutrition, dysentery, and scurvy were often rampant among the convict population. The penal colony had to be supplied by sea. Living conditions were particularly bad in the early years of the settlement. The settlement was so crowded, convicts were unable to sleep on their backs in the communal barracks. Punishment involved solitary confinement and regular floggings - 9,100 lashes were given in 1823.

In 1824 a prisoner named Trenham stabbed another convict in order to be executed rather than face further imprisonment at Macquarie Harbour Penal Station.

It was finally closed in late 1833. Most of the remaining convicts were then relocated to Port Arthur.

== Escapes ==
Despite its isolated location, a considerable number of convicts attempted to escape from the island. Bushranger Matthew Brady was among a party that successfully escaped to Hobart in 1824 after tying up their overseer and seizing a boat. James Goodwin was pardoned after his 1828 escape and was subsequently employed to make official surveys of the wilderness he had passed through. Sarah Island's most infamous escapee was Alexander Pearce who managed to get away twice. On both occasions, he cannibalized his fellow escapees.

As the station was closing down, ten convicts remained to complete an unfinished brig. The convicts later hijacked the vessel and escaped to Chile.

== Later use and current conditions ==
The island was later used for pining purposes, and was known by the piners as Settlement Island, rather than Sarah Island, though it has since reverted to its original name.

The ruins of the settlement remain today as the Sarah Island Historic Site —part of the larger Tasmanian Wilderness World Heritage Area—though they are not as well preserved as those at better-known Port Arthur. The island is accessible via ferries and charter boats operating out of the town of Strahan.

== In the media ==
Sarah Island has been frequently featured in Australian literature and theatre, often representing the worst excesses of the British convict system.

Notable books include:

- Clarke, Marcus (1892). For the Term of His Natural Life. London: R. Bentley and son. p. 472.
- Flanagan, Richard (2001). Gould's Book of Fish: a novel in twelve fish (1st Australian ed.). Sydney: Pan Macmillan. p. 403. ISBN 0-330-36378-6.
- Hughes, Robert (c. 1986). The Fatal Shore: a history of the transportation of convicts to Australia, 1787-1868 (hardback). London: Collins Harvill. p. 688. ISBN 0-00-217361-1.
- Brennan, Craig. Bound to Sarah.

In Strahan, the main port and town on the shores of Macquarie Harbour today Australia's longest running play The Ship that Never Was by Tasmanian author Richard Davey dramatises the Frederick escape, the last escape from the island. His book The Sarah Island Conspiracies - Being an account of twelve voyages to Macquarie Harbour and Sarah Island furthers understanding of the history and the recent archaeological work on the island.

The films The Last Confession of Alexander Pearce and Van Diemen's Land deal with one of the more notorious escapees.

Photography of the island and ruins have at various stages shown the ruins of the buildings:

1929 – "Sarah Island". The Australasian. Vol. CXXVII, no. 4, 210. Victoria, Australia. 14 September 1929. p. 71 – via National Library of Australia.

== Known escapees ==
- Mordecai Cohen, escaped in April 1823
- George Hammersley and James Woodward, escaped on 4 May 1824
- John Graham, John Germanston, and John McCarthy, escaped on 20 July 1825
- Matthew Brady
- Alexander Pearce
- Ten convicts, notably former whaler James Porter, in the Frederick escape

3 September 1830 five men ran away from the settlement, Richard Hutchinson, William Coventry, Patrick Fagan, Mathew Macavoy, and Broughton, and that they were upwards of thirty days before the two 'survivors' surrendered themselves at Macguire's Marsh near Osterley. On the eve of his execution, Broughton confessed to the murder and cannibalisation of Hutchinson and Coventry. He also implicated Macavoy in the crimes and alleged that Macavoy murdered Fagan despite his attempts to convince him not to

== Gallery ==
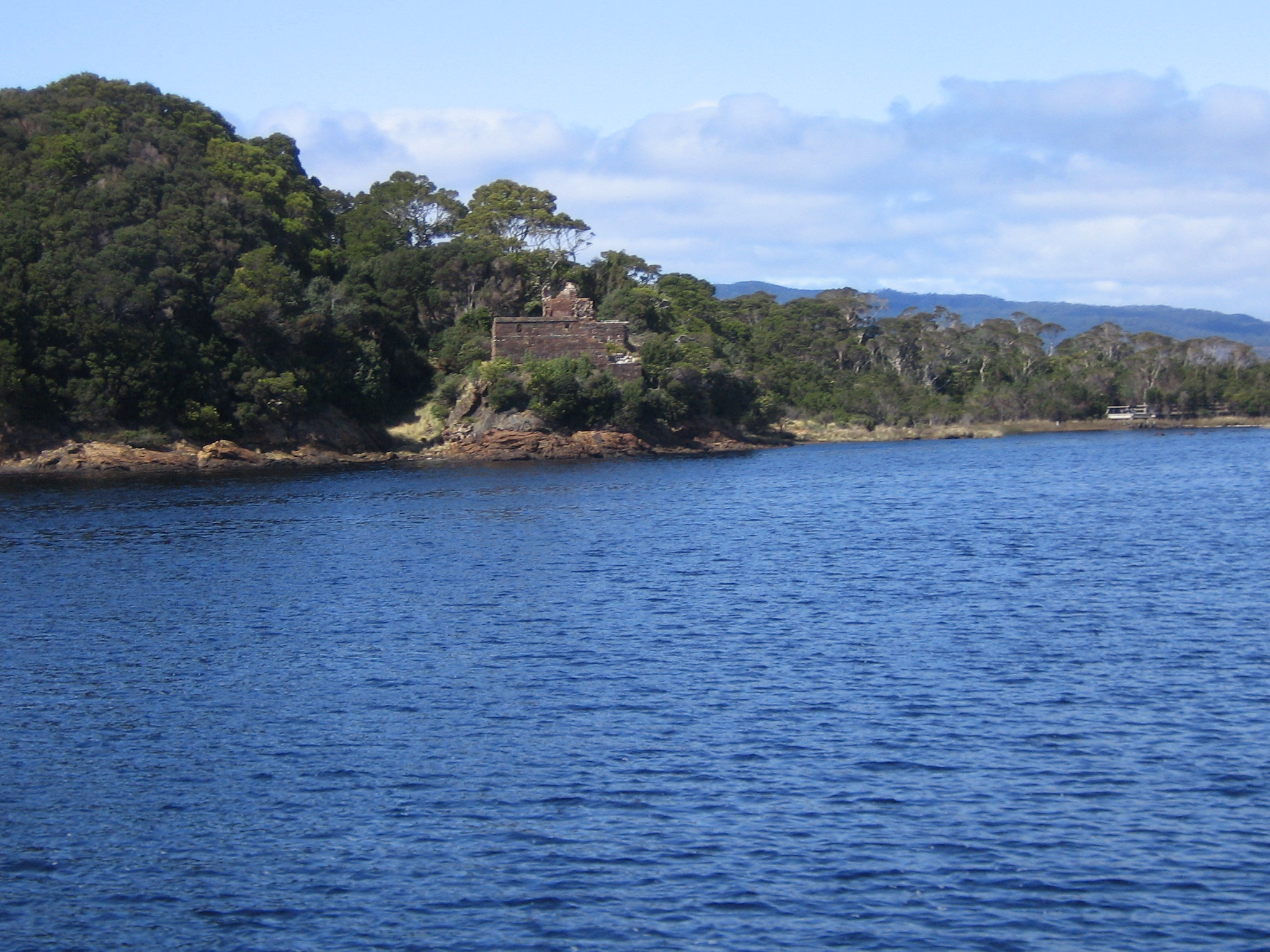
Part of Sarah Island, including ruins of the "new penitentiary"

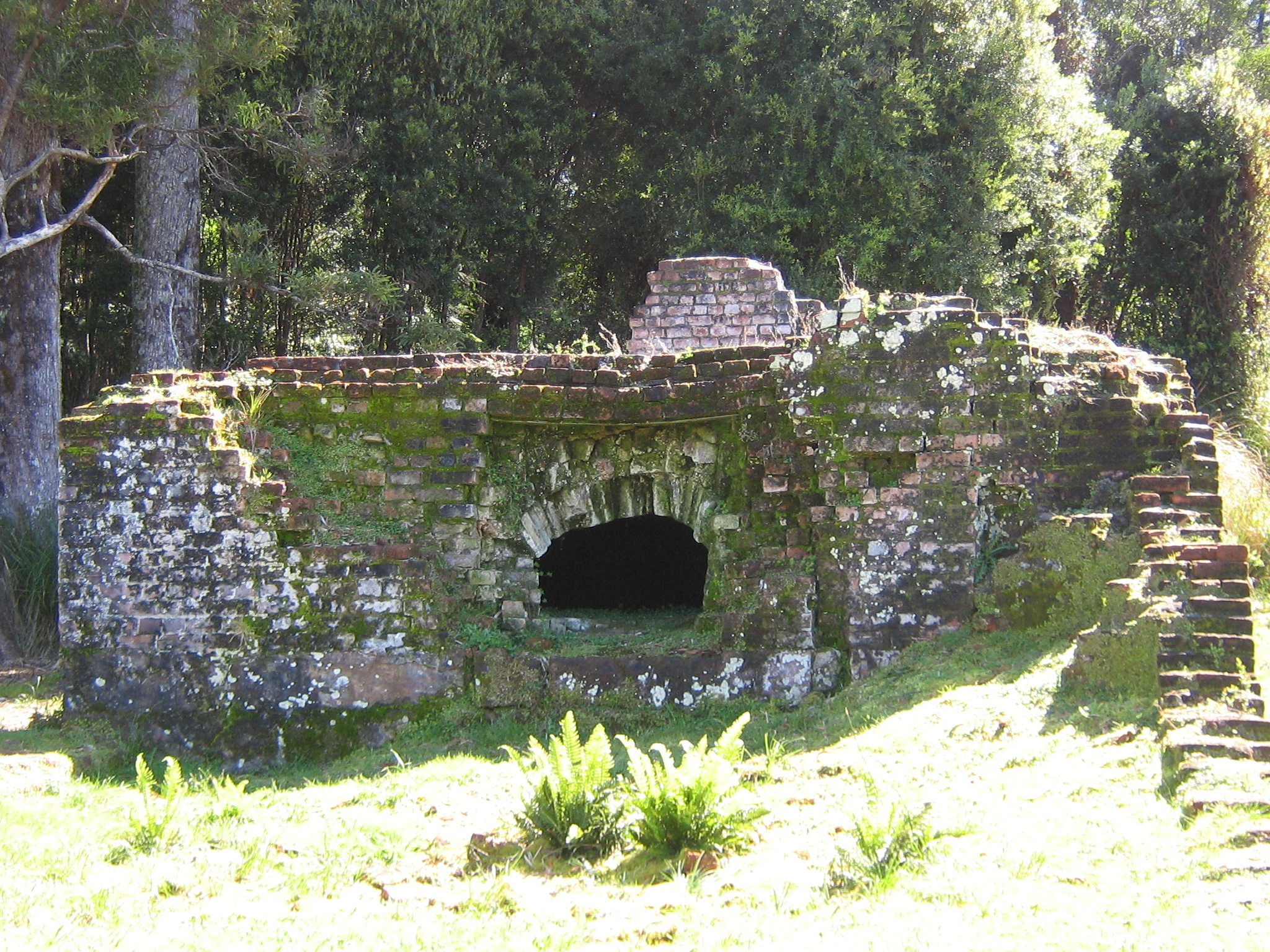
Ruins of the large domed oven in the bakehouse on Sarah Island.

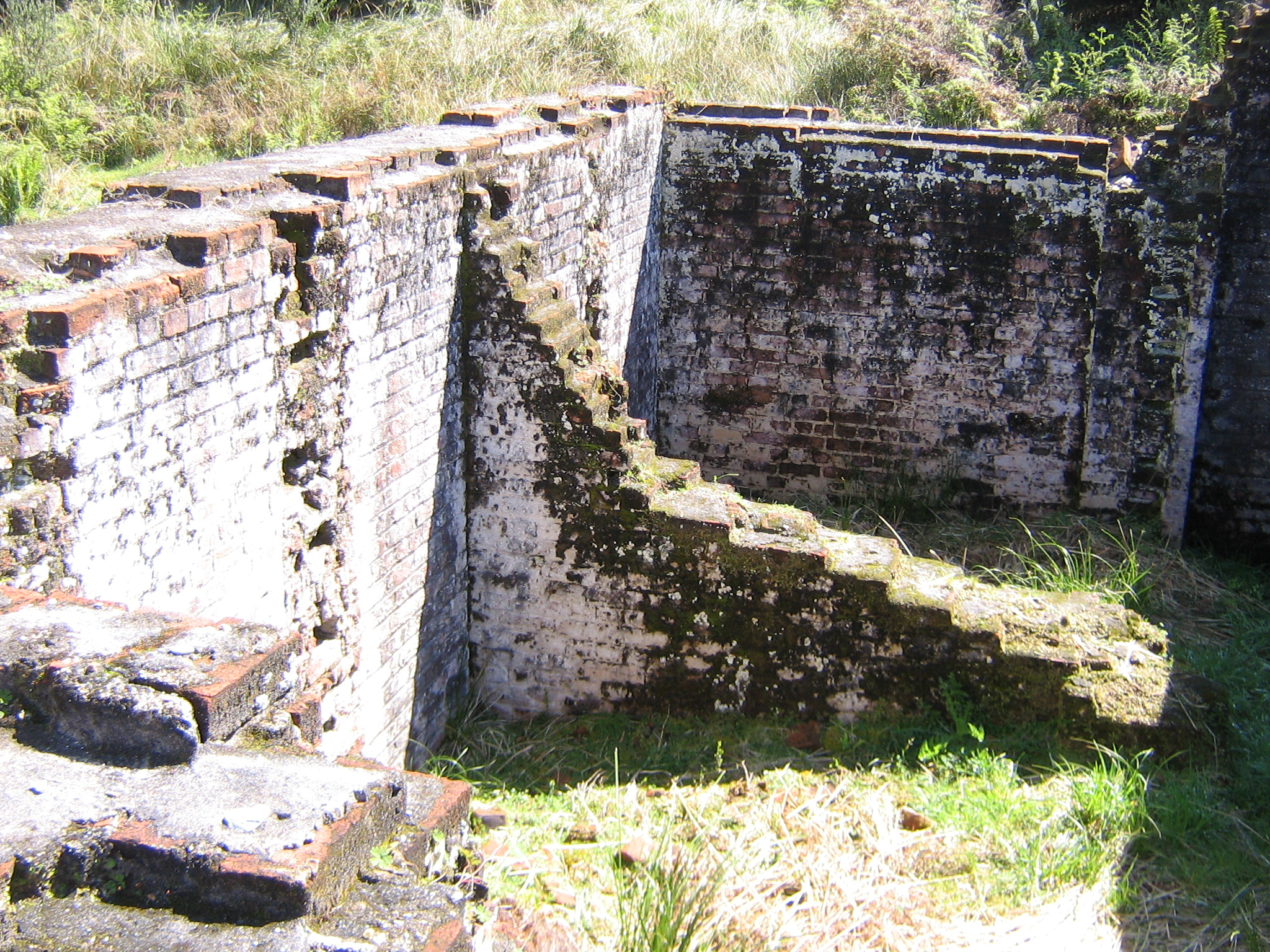
Remains of the solitary cells, which were completely dark inside and barely large enough to lie down in.

== See also ==
- Convicts on the West Coast of Tasmania
- William Buelow Gould
- Information about “The Ship That Never Was” (Australia’s longest-running play) about the last ship built at Sarah Island.
