= Patricia Payne =

Patricia Payne may refer to:

- Patricia Payne (screenwriter)
- Patricia Payne (mezzo-soprano)
