= The Ship That Never Was =

1984 Australian stage pantomime

- Original language: English
- Written by: Richard Davey
- Based on: Frederick escape
- Subject: Convict era Australia
- Genre: pantomime

Premiere
- Date: 1984
- Place: Hobart

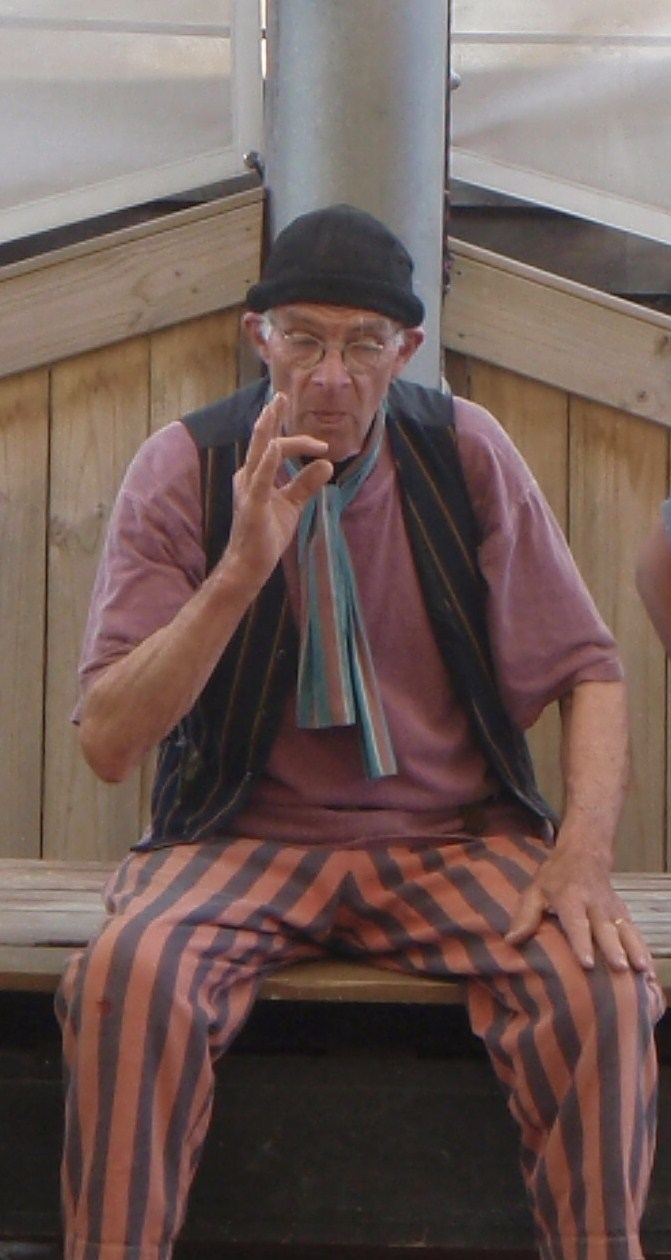
Richard Davey acting in the play

The Ship That Never Was is a 1984 Australian stage pantomime by Richard Davey based on the 1834 Frederick escape.

== Background ==
It made its debut in Hobart in 1984, at the Peacock Theatre, and the theatre company name at that stage was the Breadline Theatre Company. The play was later performed around Tasmania and Victoria. In 1993 it was transferred to the Strahan Amphitheatre by the Round Earth Theatre Company in Strahan, Tasmania. It became the longest running performance in Australia being performed seven nights a week.
