= Early Frost =

1982 Australian film

- Directed by: Brian McDuffie
- Written by: Terry O'Connor
- Produced by: David Hannay
- Starring: Jon Blake
- Cinematography: David Eggby
- Production company: Filmco
- Distributed by: Premiere (video)
- Release date: June 1988 (video)
- Running time: 95 minutes
- Country: Australia
- Language: English
- Budget: $999,000
- Box office: $4,000 (as at March 1985)

Early Frost is a 1982 Australian thriller film starring Guy Doleman, Jon Blake, Diana McLean and David Franklin.

== Plot ==
While gathering evidence for a divorce case, private detective Mike Hayes discovers a corpse. He suspects the death - officially listed as an accident - to be murder, but how, why and committed by who? The husband or the mistress?

The more Mike investigates, the more convoluted, complicated and sinister the situation becomes. Hayes meets David Prentice who keeps a scrapbook on violent crime and gets further information about the temperamental and schizophrenic Val Meadows, the mistress, and learns of her fears. She suspects that someone is trying to kill her. She has set her two sons off on a "Don't do as I do, do as I say" kind of existence, where mindless punishments are used as a substitute for love and understanding.

The wife, Peg Prentice, on the other hand, is too indulgent with her son David - accepting his disobedience - because he is the only adult in her life (her husband is constantly away on business).

A pattern begins to emerge as a photograph showing a number of women, including Val, is found. All the women in it suffered accidents - some fatal. Hayes's further investigations seem to indicate that the only people who hate Val enough to want her dead are her own family but even there, there is doubt.

The number of mysterious accidents involving the deaths of all those women in suburban Australia, lead Val to suspect her son of mass-murder.

== Cast ==
- Diana McLean as Val Meadows
- Jon Blake as Peter Meadows
- Janet Kingsbury as Peg Prentice
- David Franklin as David Prentice
- Daniel Cumerford as Joey Meadows
- Guy Doleman as Mike Hayes
- Joanne Samuel as Chris
- Kit Taylor as Paul Sloane
- Danny Adcock as John Meadows
- Gerry Sont as Party Guest

== Production ==
In 1974 David Hannay was working at Greater Union when he read a script by Terry O'Connor. Hannay was impressed and tried to raise funds for the film, and eventually succeeded through the company Filmco, run by Peter Fox and John Fitzgerald.

Hannay tried to get Brian Trenchard-Smith to direct but he was busy and eventually hired New Zealand director Brian McDuffie.

The movie was originally known as Something Wicked This Way Comes or Something Wicked but in order to avoid confusion with a Disney film of the same name the movie was retitled.

Filming took place June to August 1981. McDuffie and Hannay clashed during the shoot and McDuffie was sacked on the day of the wrap party. McDuffie took his name off the film and no director is credited although Hannay and Geoffrey Brown are credited as "post production directors". The resulting movie has been called a representation of the worst kind of tax shelter film from the 1980s.

David Hannay later recalled in 2005:

The reason The late Guy Doleman was cast was because twenty years earlier he had been my mentor when I was a young actor. I didn't do him any favours unfortunately... The original director was removed, and Geoff Brown (co-producer) and I did what we could to fix the picture. It is to this day the only Australian film to have no director's credit.

== Release ==
The film was never released theatrically.

The movie was released on video in England in 1983.

The film was one of four movies made by Filmco that were part of a legal action in 1985. A judge ordered eight Sydney stockbrokers to repay at least $615,000 to which they borrowed in 1981 to finance four films by Filmco: Early Frost (budget $1 million), The Dark Room ($1.1 million), For the Term of His Natural Life ($4 million) and A Dangerous Summer ($2.9 million). The films were not box office successes and the stock brokers refused to repay the loans when they matured in November 1983.

== Reception ==
Rob Lowing of The Age felt the film "doesn't succeed in maintaining an edge" but that Blake was "worth watching."

According to the website Hysteria Lives, "For much of its running time, Early Frost could have easily played daytime TV - and then a severed head is thrown into the mix. Its muddled result improbably explained by a script that pre-dated the slasher craze which was awkwardly - and pretty half-heartedly - retro-fitted to ape then popular trends. Early Frost is a mess, but is curiously compelling for those brave - or masochistic - enough to take a punt."
