= A Dangerous Summer =

- Directed by: Quentin Masters
- Screenplay by: David Ambrose; Quentin Masters
- Story by: Kit Denton; Jim McElroy
- Produced by: Jim McElroy
- Starring: Tom Skerritt; James Mason; Wendy Hughes; Ray Barrett; Guy Doleman
- Cinematography: Peter Hannan
- Edited by: Ted Otton
- Music by: Groove Myers
- Production company: Filmco
- Distributed by: Australia: Roadshow Entertainment; United States: Reel Media International
- Release date: 21 October 1982 (Australia)
- Running time: 88 minutes
- Country: Australia
- Language: English
- Budget: $2,930,000
- Box office: A$150,000 (as at March 1985)

A Dangerous Summer (aka Flash Fire) is a 1982 Australian crime film drama film directed by Quentin Masters and starring Tom Skerritt, Ian Gilmour, Guy Doleman and James Mason.

== Premise ==
Howard Anderson, a restless and discontented American, goes to Australia to team up with an old associate, Julian Fane. They plan the construction of a holiday resort.

While Anderson is a builder who takes pride in his work, Fane's only motive in building is to burn down the resort in an insurance fraud. He hires an arsonist to carry out the work.

Unfortunately, Fane's plans are triggered too soon and result in murder. Anderson, suspicious about events, forms an alliance with George Engels, an insurance investigator.

== Cast ==
- Tom Skerritt as Howard Anderson
- Ian Gilmour as Steve Adams
- Guy Doleman as Julian Fane
- James Mason as George Engels
- Giselle Morgan
- Shane Porteous as Sergeant Goodwin
- Ray Barrett as F.C.O. Webster
- Norman Kaye as Percy Farley
- Wendy Hughes as Sophie McCann
- Lyn Collingwood as Woman in Van

== Production ==
The film was inspired by the Sydney bush fires of the 1979-80 summer. John Seale shot footage of the fire which Brian Trenchard-Smith turned into a 25-minute film, That Dangerous Summer. It was then announced this material would be used by Trenchard Smith in a feature version of the story, to be called Bushfire. In the end, Trenchard-Smith did not direct, and Quentin Masters did with the film being produced by Peter Fox. Actor Ian Gilmour broke his leg during filming delaying production several weeks.

The film was originally budgeted at $2.3 million.

== Box office ==
A Dangerous Summer grossed $33,000 (equivalent to $130,767 in 2022) at the box office in Australia.

The film was one of four movies made by Filmco that were part of a legal action in 1985. A judge ordered eight Sydney stockbrokers to repay at least $615,000 to which they borrowed in 1981 to finance four films by Filmco: Early Frost (budget $1 million), The Dark Room ($1.1 million), For the Term of His Natural Life ($4 million) and A Dangerous Summer ($2.9 million). The films were not box office successes and the stock brokers refused to repay the loans when they matured in November 1983.

== See also ==
- Cinema of Australia
