= The Dark Room (1982 film) =

- Directed by: Paul Harmon
- Written by: Michael Brindley; Paul Harmon
- Based on: Original idea by Paul Harmon
- Produced by: Tom Haydon
- Starring: Svet Kovich; Anna Jemison; Alan Cassell
- Cinematography: Paul Onorato
- Edited by: Rod Adamson
- Music by: Cameron Allan
- Production company: Nadira
- Release date: 1982
- Running time: 94 minutes
- Country: Australia
- Language: English
- Budget: AU $1.2 million or $1,097,000
- Box office: -$1,000 (as at March 1985)

The Dark Room is a 1982 Australian thriller film directed by Paul Harmon, son of Bill Harmon.

== Plot ==
Ray Sangster, a bored middle-class man, has an affair with a younger woman, Nicky. Ray's son Mike discovers the affair and becomes obsessed with Nicky.

== Cast ==
- Alan Cassell as Ray Sangster
- Anna Maria Monticelli (Anna Jemison) as Nicky
- Svet Kovich as Mike Sangster
- Diana Davidson as Martha Sangster
- Ric Hutton as Sam Bitel
- Rowena Wallace as Liz Llewellyn
- Sean Myers as Peter
- Sally Cooper as Patricia
- Joy Hruby as Ida Henning

== Production ==
Michael Brindley wrote a script based on a story by himself and Paul Harmon. Basil Appleby was originally meant to be producer but financiers Filmco did not want him to do the job and Malcolm Smith did it. Then Smith left and documentary producer Tom Haydon produced instead. The movie was known as Double Exposure during filmling.

There was a two-week rehearsal period in which actors rewrote dialogue and treated Harmon badly.

Filming started 21 August 1981. Three weeks into the seven-week shoot the completion guarantors saw the footage and suggested Harmon be fired but the producer refused. Film editor Ron Adamson died and had to be replaced by Don Saunders.

== Release ==
The film failed to obtain a cinema release although it screened in several international film festivals. The movie also screened at the 1982 Sydney Film Festival which enabled it to get a tax deduction.

A report in October 1982 about the film's failure to receive any AFI nominations called the movie "well handled".

The film was one of four movies made by Filmco that were part of a legal action in 1985. A judge ordered eight Sydney stockbrokers to repay at least $615,000 to which they borrowed in 1981 to finance four films by Filmco: Early Frost (budget $1 million), The Dark Room ($1.1 million), For the Term of His Natural Life ($4 million) and A Dangerous Summer ($2.9 million). The films were not box office successes and the stock brokers refused to repay the loans when they matured in November 1983.

The Dark Room was delegated to home video and was not seen on TV until 1989 as a Monday night movie at 8.30pm. It was again replayed during the early 1990s though has not been seen commercially since that time. This film is still awaiting a DVD or blu-ray release.
