= James Goodwin (convict) =

- Born: circa 1800 near Northampton, England, UK
- Died: circa 1835 (aged 34–35)
- Criminal charge: Theft
- Criminal penalty: Seven years' penal servitude

James Goodwin (c. 1800 – after 1835) was a convict escapee and explorer in Van Diemen's Land (now Tasmania). In March 1828, he escaped from the notorious Sarah Island prison with fellow convict Thomas Connolly, and the two were the first white men to pass through the Lake St Clair region. Assuming Goodwin was then taken on to Hobart, he is the first white man to have traversed Tasmania from west to east.

== Early life ==
Goodwin was born in or near Northampton and was convicted of thieving at the Northampton Assizes on 3 March 1821. He was sentenced to seven years' penal servitude and, after several months on prison hulk Bellarophon in Woolwich, he sailed on the Lord Hungerford for Hobart. While a prisoner, he worked for Thomas Scott, assistant to Surveyor General, George Frankland and gained valuable knowledge about the Tasmanian interior.

== Escape ==
In March 1828, Goodwin and another convict, Irishman, Thomas Connolly were part of a logging party on the Gordon River. The men took advantage of a job that didn't require them to return to Sarah Island at night and which provided them with rations in bulk which they could store for later. Over a two-week period, they fashioned a boat out of a pine log which they used to escape up river and which they only abandoned when faced with some unpassable falls. They were assisted by Goodwin's bushcraft and a compass which he had stolen from Scott. The exact route the men took is unknown but they would have probably followed either the Franklin River or Denison River, both of which flow into the Gordon, before heading east into the Vale of Rasselas. From there they would have passed Wyld's Craig before emerging at the Ouse River. As well as their prison rations, they survived on grass roots, berries, mushrooms and food scavenged from Aborigines. Four weeks after their escape, the men split up near the settlement of Ouse. Goodwin was recaptured, but Connolly was never heard of again.

== Pardon and surveying duties ==
Due to his feat of endurance and his unique experience of the South West Wilderness, Goodwin was pardoned and seconded to several surveying expeditions including John Charles Darke's unsuccessful 1832 exploration of the area to the South of Wyld's Craig.

== Return to prison ==
Goodwin's freedom was short-lived—he was caught stealing in 1835 and was sent by personal order of Lieutenant Governor George Arthur to Norfolk Island. Convict Peak and Goodwins Creek near the confluence of the Gordon and Franklin Rivers in the Franklin-Gordon Wild Rivers National Park are named after James Goodwin.

== See also ==
- List of convicts transported to Australia
