= Filmco =

Australian investment company

Filmco was an Australian investment company used by producers to raise funds to invest in Australian movies. It flourished during the 10BA era.

The company was formed in 1980 by Peter Fox and Bob Sanders (who merged his Pact Productions into the company). Pact Productions had provided finance for Harlequin. Breaker Morant and Sara Dane; it was a subsidiary of Adelaide Holdings. They were joined by John Fitzgerald, a former lawyer at the South Australian Film Corporation, who acted as executive producer. David Stratton wrote that "the Filmco slate consisted of some of the most dismal films ever produced in Australia" and represented "a scandalous waste of money".

In June 1981 it was announced Filmco helped raise finance for Burning Man, Something Wicked this way comes, For the Term of His Natural Life, Double Deal and Billy West, and it would raise money for Turkey Shoot.

Peter Fox was killed in a car accident on 1 December 1981.

== Select credits ==
- Turkey Shoot (1982)
- Early Frost (1982)
- A Dangerous Summer (1982)
- The Dark Room (1982)
- Midnite Spares (1982)
- Far East (1982)
- For the Term of His Natural Life (1983) (mini series)
- Double Deal (1983)
- 'Undercover (1983)
