= Round Earth Theatre Company =

Theatre group in Western Tasmania, Australia

Coordinates: 42.154°S 145.328°E

Round Earth Company
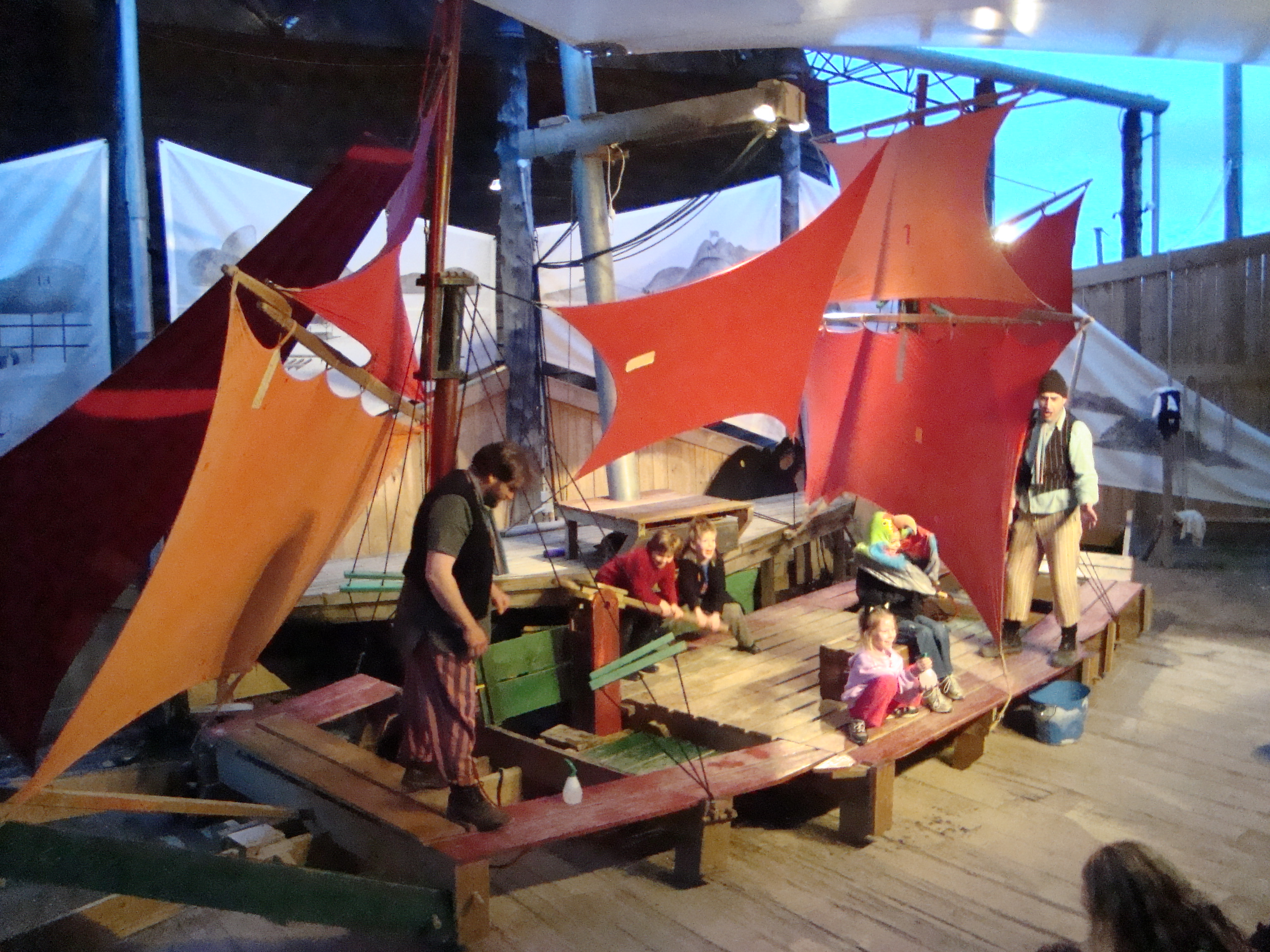
- Interactive map of Round Earth Company
- Address: Strahan; Australia
- Location: Tasmania

Construction
- Opened: Perth 1972; Strahan 1994

Website
- http://www.roundearth.com.au

The Round Earth Company, founded by Richard Davey (died 2013), performs in Strahan, West Coast, Tasmania. Each night the company performs Australia's longest-running play, The Ship That Never Was. During the day the actors work as tour guides on Sarah Island, explaining the history and unique story of this Tasmanian penal settlement.

== History ==
The Round Earth Company was established in Western Australia in 1972 as an on-the-road performing company taking stories to networks of communities and collecting new stories from the communities. In 1973–1974, funded by the Australia Council, three journeys into the North and Central deserts were undertaken, with storytellers, musicians, artists and craft workers visiting mining towns and Aboriginal communities.

In 1975, the family company travelled to North and Central America, Britain, Europe, Egypt, and India for four years. They linked up with various communities and performance companies along the way, participating, for example, in rain and harvest dance rituals in Hopi villages in Arizona, with Canadian companies creating stories in remote communities, and with travelling troupes in India that performed legendary epics.

In 1980, the family returned to Australia and based itself in Hobart, Tasmania where the Salamanca Arts Centre provided a venue. They created a repertoire of stories in and about Tasmania in the hope of shedding some light on the overall Australian story, then took this story on the road. By 1988, a repertoire of performances, including Broken Dreams in Adelaide and Melbourne in 1984, and Hallelujah Lady Jane, Pieces of Iron and Guarding the Perimeter from 1986 to 1988, was forming and had begun to find its way interstate.

=== Zootango ===
From 1987 to 1993 The Round Earth Company established a professional company in Tasmania after the demise of The Island Theatre Company, to provide the state with an ensemble company. However, Zootango, as the new company was known, lost the public funding on which it was dependent. "In 1997 a change of Federal policy towards regional theatre resulted in the withdrawal of Arts Tasmania and the Australia Council's combined yearly funding for the Company of $220,000. The company reduced the number of its productions but was forced to cease operations in late 1997."

=== The Ship That Never Was ===
In 1992, Round Earth went solo again, attempting a return to the road with A Bright and Crimson Flower, a large-scale epic about Australian Prisoners of War under the Japanese. Between 1992 and 1995 A Bright and Crimson Flower performed in Tasmania, Victoria, South Australia and New South Wales.

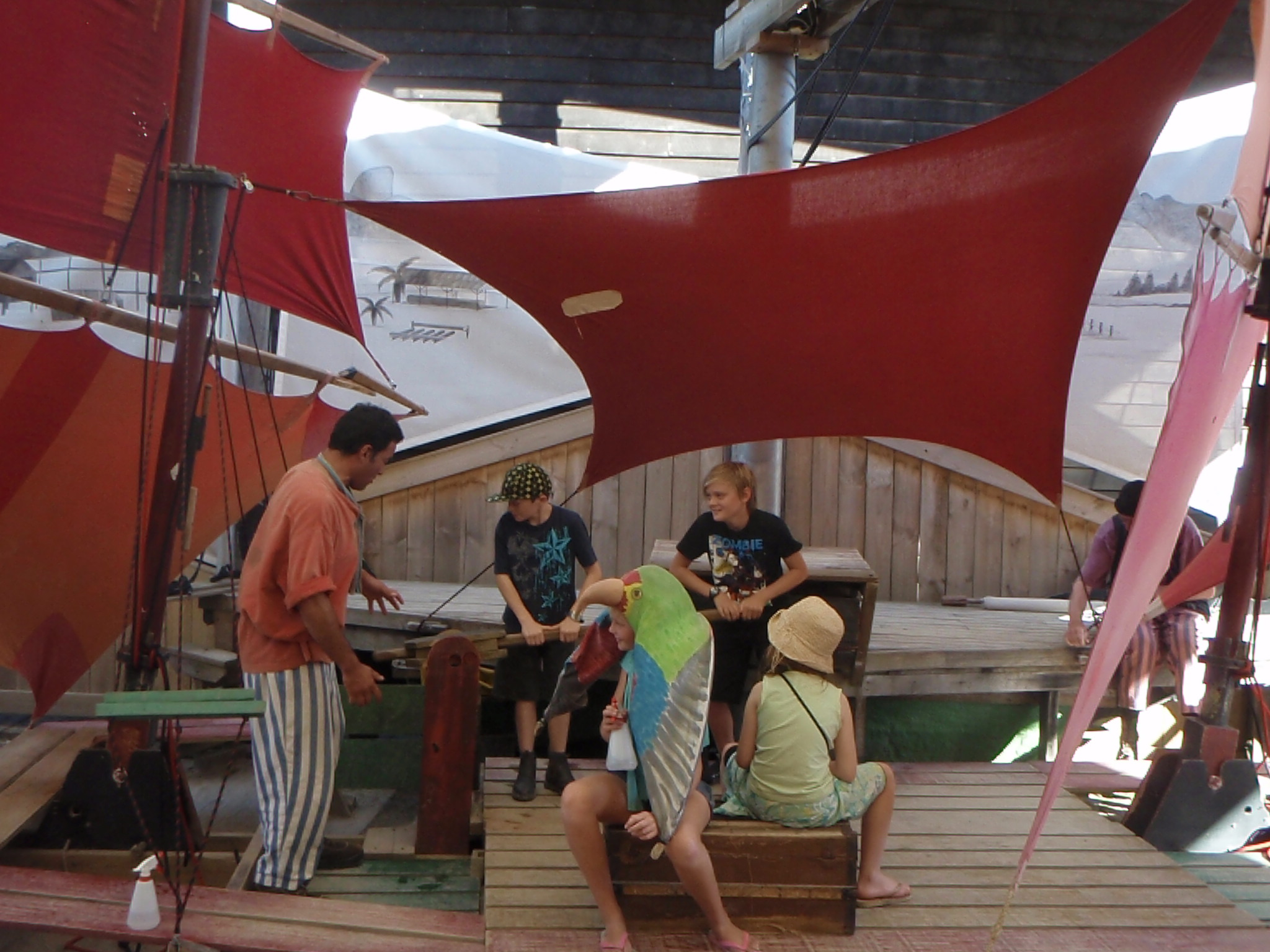
Members of the audience, adults and children alike become temporary actors (and sailors) of "The Ship That Never Was" as the Frederick is reconstructed on stage during each performance

In 1994, in response to a request by Alan Coates, a Tasmanian Parks Ranger, The Round Earth Company, facing bankruptcy, took a two-person play to Strahan on the West Coast of Tasmania, performing The Ship That Never Was. Originally written and produced at the Peacock Theatre in Hobart in 1982 for Breadline Theatre Company, it is the story of the Frederick escape, in which ten convicts hijacked the brig Frederick from Sarah Island and escaped to Chile for two years before they were retrieved. It performed in Strahan in 1993 for eight weeks, in a woodchop arena, aboard yachts, on Sarah Island, outside the Strahan Pub, and even at the Mount Lyell picnic on the beach. During the play, a mock ship is built on the stage with the actors enlisting audience members, including children, as characters in the play. The Ship That Never Was performs every day and has exceeded 5000 performances.

=== Tour guide and information service ===
In 1998, the Company undertook to operate the Strahan Visitor Centre, curating an exhibition created by Robert Morris-Nunn and Richard Flanagan, and providing printed information to tourists. As an added income stream, the company provides up to four daily guided tours on Sarah Island, incorporating dramatic performances.

Published information booklets included The Sarah Island Conspiracies by Richard Davey and The Travails of Jimmy Porter (2003), the memoir written on Norfolk Island in 1842 by James Porter, one of the leaders of the escape on the Frederick.

== See also ==
- Convicts on the West Coast of Tasmania
- Macquarie Harbour
- Frederick escape
