= Diana McLean =

Australian actress

- Born: 5 December 1941 (age 84); Sydney, New South Wales, Australia
- Occupations: Actress, voice artist
- Years active: 1969–present
- Known for: The Young Doctors

Diana McLean (5 December 1941) is an Australian stage and television actress and voice over artist, best known for her role as Sister Vivienne Jeffries in TV soap opera The Young Doctors in 618 episodes from 1978 and 1981.

== Acting career ==
=== Television and film ===
McLean made guest appearances in the comedy series Good Morning Mr Doubleday (1969), the classic Australian police series Division 4 (1970) and Boney (1973). She also appeared in a recurring role as Dorothy Dunlop in the Australian series Number 96.

In 1975, she appeared as Helen McGuire in nine episodes of the miniseries Ben Hall. She then starred in a regular role as Sister Vivienne Jeffries (from 1978 until 1982) in the series The Young Doctors. In 1981, she also starred in both the miniseries Winner Take All, and the Ozploitation film, Early Frost.

In 1999, McLean played the part of Bess O'Brien in Neighbours for 10 episodes. She made further guest appearances in various TV series, and featured in several short films. Most recently, she has appeared in The End (2020) as Iris and North Shore (2023) as Marjorie Abbott.

=== Theatre ===
McLean's work in the theatre has included The Cold Child in 2006 and Love & Money in 2007. In 2014, she reprised her role of Vera in 4000 Miles, for which she was nominated for the "Best Actress in a Leading Role in an Independent Production" Sydney Theatre Award in 2013. She toured Australia in 2017 and 2018, playing Florence Foster Jenkins in the stage comedy Glorious. She also appeared in the play Air in 2018.

=== Other work ===
In 2010, she attended a book launch by screen writer, director and producer Alan Coleman. His autobiography, "One Door Shuts" was launched at the Hotel Bondi, Sydney on 10 January 2010.

In 2014, McLean explained her voice techniques in a video called The Other Side of the Glass.

In 2018, she appeared on the Australian programme The Daily Edition to discuss her career.

== Filmography ==
=== Film ===
Year	Title	Role	Type
1973	Waiting ...for Lucas		Short film
1982	Early Frost	Val Meadows	Feature film
1998	Paperback Hero	Harmony	Feature film
2009	A Model Daughter: The Killing of Caroline Byrne	Brenda Wood	TV movie
2011	The Happenstance	Attendant	Short film
2013	Stew	Grandmother	Short film
2014	The Other Side of the Glass	Herself	Film documentary
2016	Banana Boy	Doreen	Short film
2016	French Girls	Narrator	Short film
2017	Chapter One: Book Club	Boss Lady	Short film
2023	The Choice to Love		Short film

=== Television ===
Year	Title	Role	Type
1969	Good Morning, Mr. Doubleday	Debbie	TV series, 1 episode
1970	Division 4	Colleen Rankin	TV series, 1 episode
1973	Boney	Jessica Menzies	TV series, 1 episode
1973	Number 96	Dorothy Dunlop	TV series, 11 episodes
1975	Ben Hall	Helen McGuire (new Walsh)	TV series, 9 episodes
1978–1981	The Young Doctors	Sister Vivienne Jeffries	TV series, 618 episodes
1982	Winner Take All	Margaret Coleman	TV miniseries, 10 episodes
1997	Murder Call	Adele Andriette	TV series, 1 episode
1997	The Adventures of Sam	Voice over character	Animated TV series, 2 episodes
1998; 2001	Water Rats	Elizabeth Cartland / Trish	TV series, 2 episodes
1999	Neighbours	Bess O'Brien	TV series, 10 episodes
2002	All Saints	Mary Willard	TV series, 1 episode
2013	Wonderland	Celebrant	TV series, 1 episode
2015	How Not to Behave	Ensemble cast	TV series, 1 episode
2020	The End	Iris	TV series, 8 episodes
2023–	North Shore	Marjorie Abbott	TV series, 3 episodes

=== Television (as self) ===
Year	Title	Role	Type
1996	40 Years of TV Stars... Then and Now	Herself	TV special
2001	BackBerner	Herself	TV series
2016	Studio 10	Guest (with The Young Doctors cast: Chris King, Judy McBurney, Karen Petersen & Tim Page)	TV series, 1 episode
2017; 2018	The Daily Edition	Guest	TV series, 1 episode

== Theatre ==
Year	Title	Role	Notes
1981	A Bedfull of Foreigners	Helga Philby	Marian Street Theatre, Sydney
2002	Bench	Dolly	Darlinghurst Theatre, Sydney
2004	Howard the Arselicker		Seymour Centre, Sydney with 24HRRR
2006	The Cold Child (Das Kalte Kind)	Mummy	Stables Theatre, Sydney with Griffin Theatre Company
2006	The Trestle at Pope Lick Creek	Gin Chance	Lock Up, Sydney with Alchemy Theatre Company
2007	Love & Money		Old Fitz Theatre, Sydney
2008	Colder	Robyn	Stables Theatre, Sydney with Griffin Theatre Company & Pussycatomoko
2010	Three Sisters		Wharf Theatre, Sydney with Cry Havoc & ATYP
2011	Julius Caesar		New Theatre, Sydney
2013; 2014	4000 Miles	Vera Joseph	Wharf Theatre, Sydney, Roundhouse Theatre, Brisbane with ATYP
2014	Other Desert Cities	Silda	Ensemble Theatre, Sydney
2016	4000 Miles	Vera Joseph	Australian regional tour with ATYP
2017–18	Glorious	Florence Foster Jenkins	Australian national tour with HIT Productions
2018	Air	Mabel	The Old 505 Theatre, Sydney
2018	The Humans	Momo	Old Fitz Theatre, Sydney with Red Line Productions
