= West Coast Piners =

West Coast Piners were groups of men who worked on the West Coast of Tasmania, Australia, logging Huon pine.

In most cases they used Strahan as their base, as it was the port from which the timber was shipped. The main eras of the Piners were the Sarah Island convict era (1821–33, 1846–47) and the period from the 1890s to the 1940s.

Most of their activities were focused on the rivers (and their tributaries) that flow into Macquarie Harbour – the King River and the Gordon River. The smaller rivers flowing into Macquarie Harbour on the eastern side are Pine Cove Creek, the Braddon River, the Clark River, and the Bird River. Also Birch's Inlet was an area where pine was transported from.

They were celebrated by an annual event at Strahan, known as the Piners' Festival, which was conducted for a few years.
