= Patricia Payne (screenwriter) =

Australian screenwriter and film producer

Patricia Payne is an Australian screenwriter and film producer. Her best-known work is For the Term of His Natural Life, based on the book by Marcus Clarke.

== Biography ==
Payne grew up in Kogarah, a southern suburb of Sydney. She was employed as an assistant to Harry Wren, a theatrical agency and theatre director. She then moved overseas to work as a writer, producer and casting agent in the UK and Canada.

She was president of Trainco Talent Agency in Toronto, Canada, before setting up Patti Payne Casting, where she worked with an impressive array of American, Canadian and British actors including Michael Douglas, Blythe Danner, John Candy, Martin Short, Gilda Radner, Eugene Levy, Anthony Perkins, Stefanie Powers, Leslie Nielsen, Martin Sheen, and William Shatner.

Her writing credits include longform projects for CBS, Universal, and TORSTAR, and include Captain America, a movie-of-the-week adaptation from the Stan Lee Marvel Comic Book which was released internationally as a theatrical film.

Her best-known work is For the Term of His Natural Life, a six-hour miniseries which she wrote and produced with Wilton Schiller, starring Anthony Perkins and Colin Friels.

Her most recent film is California Dreaming starring Lea Thompson, Patricia Richardson and Dave Foley, and written and directed by Linda Voorhees.

She is currently producing the music series "Jim J's Jukebox", and is in pre-production on the comedy feature film No Kava for Johnny based on the book by John O'Grady.
