= Strahan, Tasmania =

Town and port in Tasmania, Australia

Strahan
- Town
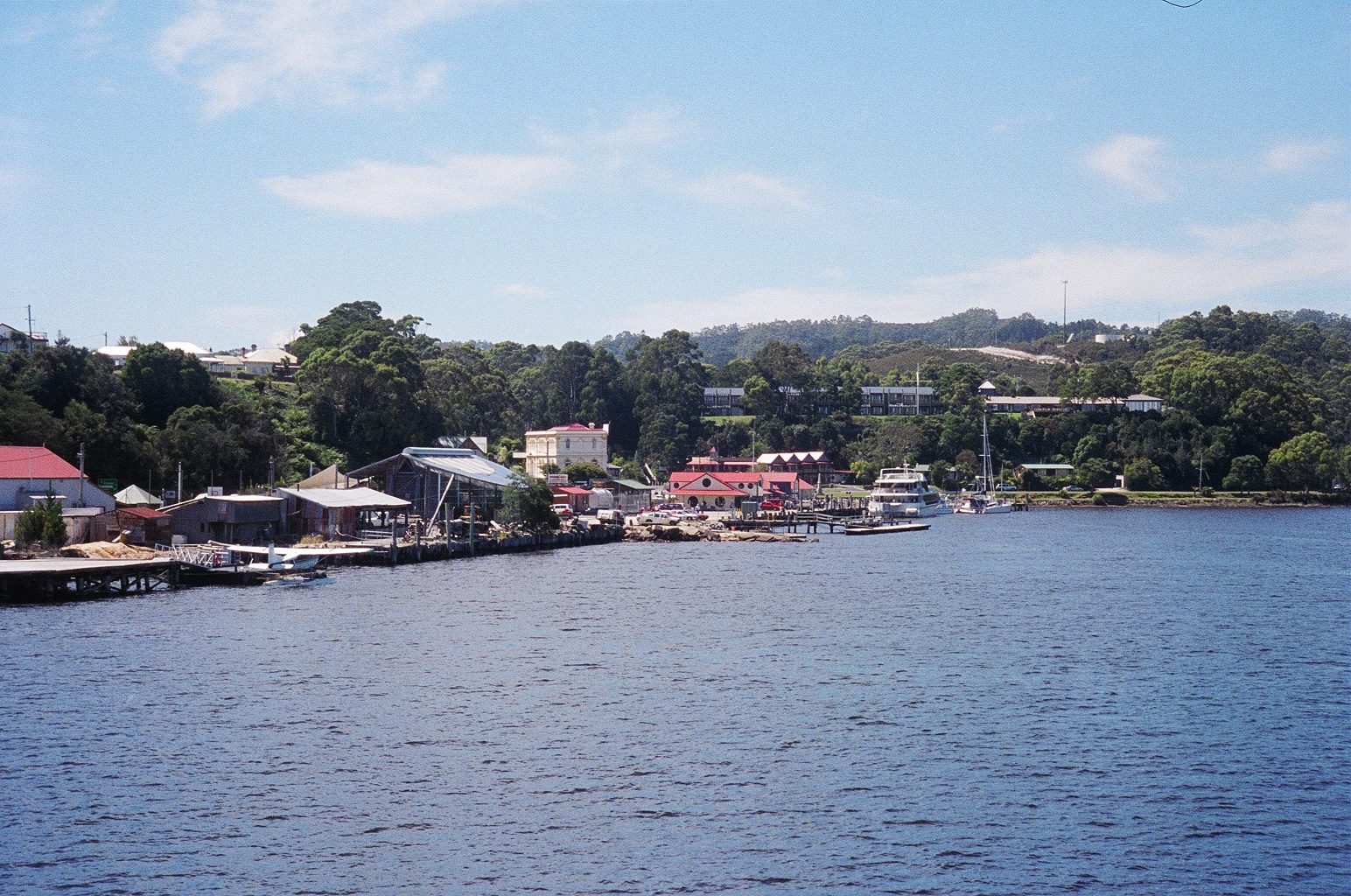
- A view of Strahan, taken from a boat in Macquarie Harbour

- Coordinates: 42°09′S 145°19′E
- Country: Australia
- State: Tasmania
- LGA: West Coast Council
- Location: 42 km (26 mi) SW of Queenstown; 43 km (27 mi) S of Zeehan; 180 km (110 mi) SW of Burnie; 302 km (188 mi) NW of Hobart

Government
  - State electorate: Braddon
  - Federal division: Braddon
- Elevation: 20 m (66 ft)

Population
  - Total: 634 (2021 census)
- Postcode: 7468
- Mean max temp: 16.4 °C (61.5 °F)
- Mean min temp: 7.9 °C (46.2 °F)
- Annual rainfall: 1,466.5 mm (57.74 in)

Strahan (/ˈstrɔːn/ STRAWN) is a small town and former port on the west coast of Tasmania. It is now a significant locality for tourism in the region.

Strahan Harbour and Risby Cove form part of the north-east end of Long Bay on the northern end of Macquarie Harbour. At the 2021 census, Strahan had a population of 634.

== Port ==
Originally developed as a port of access for the mining settlements in the area, the town was known as Long Bay or Regatta Point. In 1881, the settlement was renamed, after the colony's new Governor, Sir George Cumine Strahan. The town was officially proclaimed in 1892.

Strahan was a vital location for the timber industry that existed around Macquarie Harbour.

For a substantial part of the nineteenth century and early twentieth century it also was port for regular shipping of passengers and cargo. The Strahan Marine Board was an important authority dealing with the issues of the port and Macquarie Harbour, up until the end of the twentieth century when it was absorbed into the Hobart Marine Board.

== Post offices ==
Macquarie Harbour Post Office opened on 16 May 1878, was renamed Strahan in 1881 and closed in 1891. East Strahan Post Office opened in 1891 and was renamed Strahan in 1893.

== Fishing and tourism ==
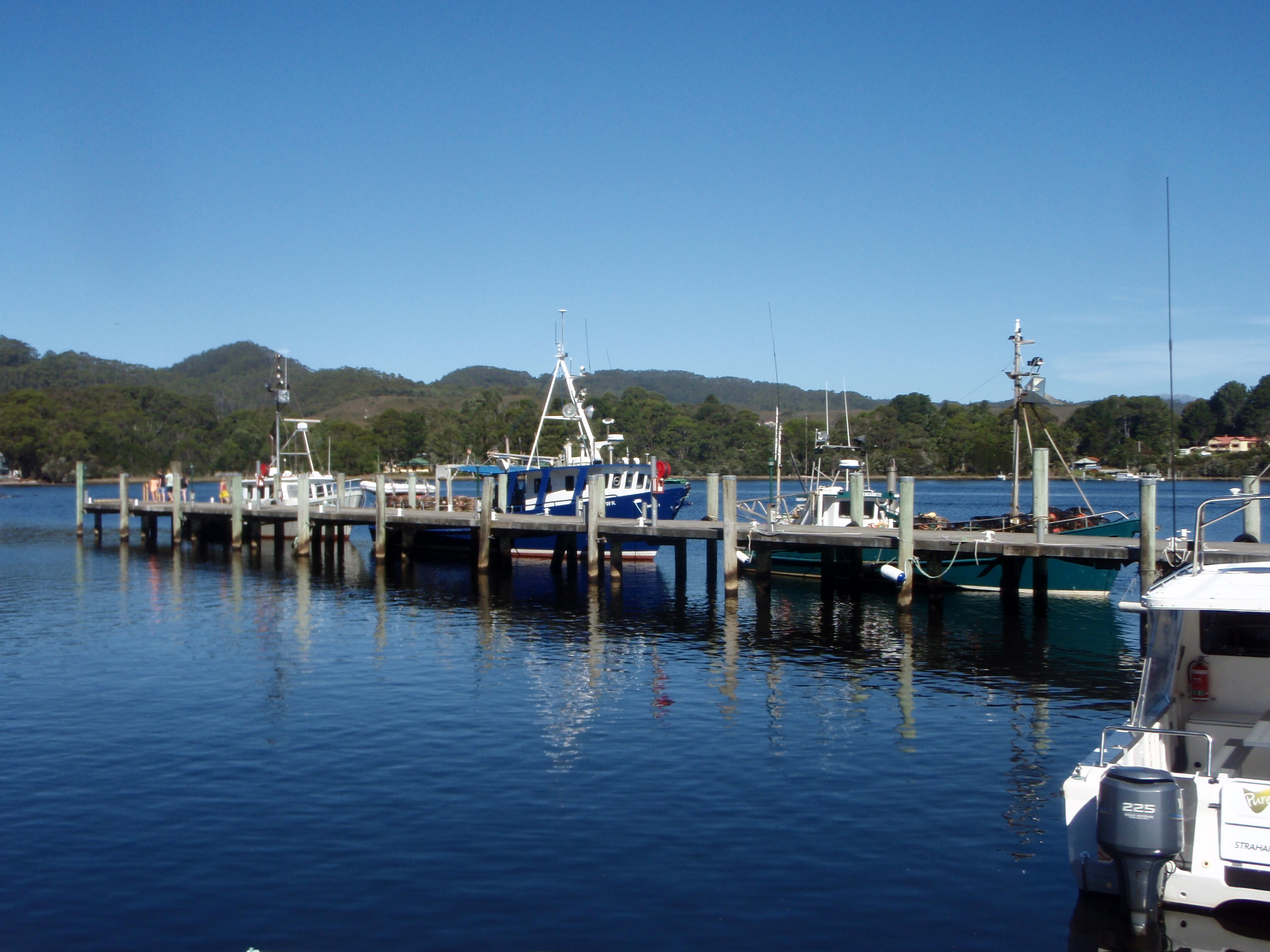
Strahan port and fishing vessels

Historically Strahan has been a port to a small fishing fleet that braves the west coast conditions and Hell's Gates. It is the nearest inhabited locality to Cape Sorell and is considered a gateway to the south-west wilderness, as boats, planes and helicopters utilise Strahan as their base when travelling into the region.

The Huon pine industry utilised stands around the harbour and up the tributary rivers - including King River, the Franklin River and the Gordon River.

Strahan is an access point to the Franklin-Gordon Wild Rivers National Park, which was declared part of the Tasmanian Wilderness World Heritage Area in 1982. For several years Strahan became the focus of a conservation campaign opposed to the proposed Franklin-below-Gordon Dam.

Strahan is the location of the only all weather commercial airport in Western Tasmania, Strahan Airport. Also located at the airport is the Automatic Weather Station, an important western Tasmania weather observation point.

Strahan is the base for boat trips to Sarah Island, the notorious penal settlement that garnered the reputation as the harshest penal settlement in the Australian colonies, and the lower Gordon River.

It is the home of the Round Earth Theatre Company, which conducts explanatory tours of Sarah Island and also has produced a daily enactment/play about Sarah Island, The Ship That Never Was, which has exceeded 5000 performances and is Australia's longest running play.

== Railways ==
Strahan was a stopping place on the former Strahan to Zeehan railway. It was also known as Strahan Wharf. The railway was government owned, and ran past the wharf at Strahan, and continued southwards around the harbour before running north on its way to Zeehan. Strahan was connected with the former Mount Lyell railway line at a terminus at Regatta Point which is also the terminus of the currently operating West Coast Wilderness Railway.

== Cultural references ==
An extinct species of Banksia, fossils of which were found in sediment at nearby Regatta Point, was named Banksia strahanensis after the town.

The American entertainer Grattan Riggs (January 1835 – 15 June 1899) died in Strahan hospital, and was buried there.

== Climate ==
Strahan has an oceanic climate (Cfb) with cool to mild, damp summers and cool to cold, very rainy winters. Lying on Tasmania's west coast, Strahan is frequently buffeted by low pressure systems off the Southern Ocean, causing heavy rain and gusty winds. Strahan receives 15.7 days, on average, of clear weather annually.

Temperatures vary little between summer and winter, with minimums below 3 °C (37 °F) having been recorded in every month. Hot weather is rare, with an average of only one day reaching 35 °C (95 °F) or above every three years. The highest recorded temperature is 38.6 °C (101.5 °F) on 14 February 1982, with the lowest recorded being −3.0 °C (26.6 °F) on 30 June 1983. Snow down to sea level is uncommon, but falls frequently in the low hills just a few kilometres inland of Strahan.

Climate data for Strahan Aerodrome (1981–2024); 21 m AMSL; 42.16° S, 145.29° E
Month	Jan	Feb	Mar	Apr	May	Jun	Jul	Aug	Sep	Oct	Nov	Dec	Year
Record high °C (°F)	38.2 (100.8)	38.6 (101.5)	36.1 (97.0)	27.8 (82.0)	23.3 (73.9)	19.9 (67.8)	18.3 (64.9)	22.5 (72.5)	27.0 (80.6)	31.9 (89.4)	32.9 (91.2)	36.9 (98.4)	38.6 (101.5)
Mean daily maximum °C (°F)	21.1 (70.0)	21.2 (70.2)	19.6 (67.3)	16.8 (62.2)	14.4 (57.9)	12.8 (55.0)	12.3 (54.1)	13.1 (55.6)	14.4 (57.9)	16.3 (61.3)	18.1 (64.6)	19.5 (67.1)	16.6 (61.9)
Mean daily minimum °C (°F)	11.0 (51.8)	10.8 (51.4)	10.0 (50.0)	8.6 (47.5)	7.5 (45.5)	5.7 (42.3)	5.4 (41.7)	5.7 (42.3)	6.4 (43.5)	7.3 (45.1)	8.5 (47.3)	9.8 (49.6)	8.1 (46.5)
Record low °C (°F)	0.6 (33.1)	2.6 (36.7)	0.8 (33.4)	−0.2 (31.6)	−0.6 (30.9)	−3.0 (26.6)	−2.7 (27.1)	−2.8 (27.0)	−2.4 (27.7)	−1.1 (30.0)	0.9 (33.6)	1.1 (34.0)	−3.0 (26.6)
Average precipitation mm (inches)	80.3 (3.16)	69.1 (2.72)	104.8 (4.13)	115.8 (4.56)	158.7 (6.25)	154.6 (6.09)	177.5 (6.99)	183.0 (7.20)	147.1 (5.79)	119.6 (4.71)	94.8 (3.73)	93.3 (3.67)	1,496.6 (58.92)
Average precipitation days (≥ 0.2 mm)	15.7	13.3	18.4	19.7	23.3	22.2	23.9	25.2	23.3	21.7	18.1	18.1	242.9
Average afternoon relative humidity (%)	62	60	64	69	75	76	75	71	69	64	61	63	67
Source: Bureau of Meteorology

== See also ==
- Strahan travel guide from Wikivoyage
- Convicts on the West Coast of Tasmania
- Macquarie Harbour
- Railways on the West Coast of Tasmania
- West Coast Piners
