= Marcus Clarke =

English-born Australian novelist, journalist and poet

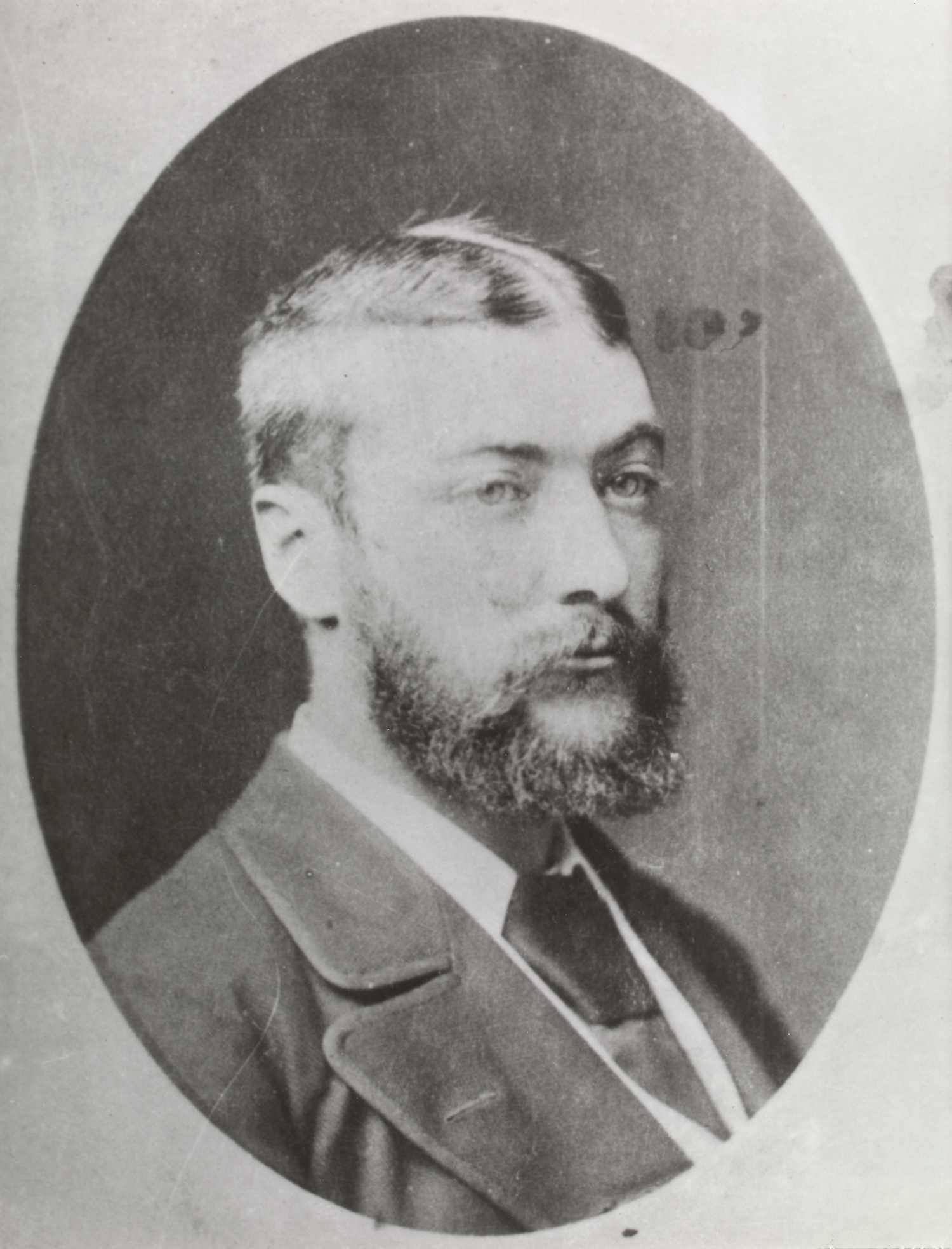
- Born: Marcus Andrew Hislop Clarke; 24 April 1846; Kensington, London, England
- Died: 2 August 1881 (aged 35); Melbourne, Victoria, Australia
- Occupations: Novelist, journalist, poet, editor, librarian and playwright
- Notable work: For the Term of His Natural Life (published 1874)
- Awards: Fellow of the Royal Society of Arts

Marcus Andrew Hislop Clarke FRSA (24 April 1846 – 2 August 1881) was an English-born Australian novelist, journalist, poet, editor, librarian, and playwright. He is best known for his 1874 novel For the Term of His Natural Life, about the convict system in Australia, and widely regarded as a classic of Australian literature. It has been adapted into many plays, films and a folk opera.

== Biography ==
=== Background and early life ===
Marcus Clarke was born in 11 Leonard Place, Kensington, London, the only son of London barrister William Hislop Clarke and Amelia Elizabeth Matthews Clarke, who died when he was just four years old. He was the nephew of Lieutenant-Colonel Sir Andrew Clarke, a Governor of Western Australia, and grandson of a retired military medical officer, Dr Andrew Clarke, who made his fortune in the West Indies and settled in Ireland. Clarke was born with his left arm at least two inches shorter than the right, which prevented him from joining the army, though he became an accomplished diver in his days at Cholmeley Grammar, Highgate School. Clarke also had a slight stammer which remained his whole life.

Marcus Clarke was educated at Highgate School (1858–62), where his classmates included Gerard Manley Hopkins, Cyril Hopkins and E.H. Coleridge. Clarke attracted Hopkins' attention primarily due to his eloquence, leading Hopkins to describe him as a "kaleidoscopic, parti-coloured, harlequinesque, thaumatropic Being" Clarke had problems with applying himself to his schoolwork, and was deprived, in his senior year, of the poetry prize as punishment. On one hand he was considered charming and witty, but on the other spoilt, conceited and aimless which could be partially attributed to his Bohemian upbringing by this father, and the novels which he spent much of his time reading.

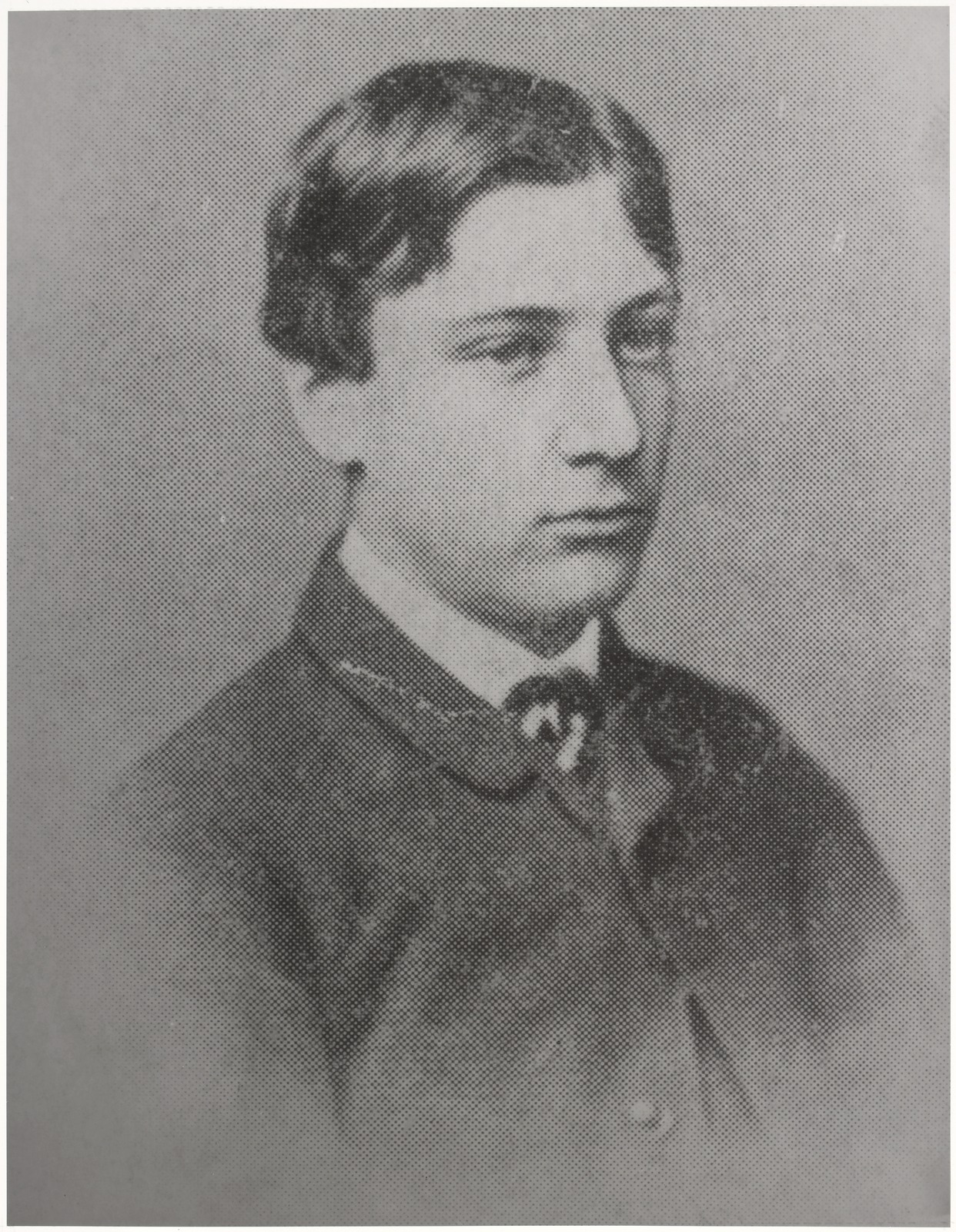
Marcus Clarke as a young man, 1858

In 1862, father William was sent to Northumberland House suffering a mental, physical, and financial breakdown and died there a year later, leaving Clarke an orphan and without the means to live as a dilettante, which had been his expectation. The biography "Cyril Hopkins' Marcus Clarke" is the only first-hand account of Clarke's early life in London. It draws on first-hand experiences of both author and subject.

At age 17, his cousin, Andrew Clarke, suggested he emigrate to Victoria where another relative, their uncle, James Langton Clarke, was a county court judge working in Ararat. Writing from his journey to Australia, he sent Hopkins a letter describing a sunset he had witnessed; this letter probably figured as partial inspiration for Hopkins' poem "A Vision of the Mermaids". After arriving in Melbourne on 6 June 1863, Clarke was at first a clerk in the Bank of Australasia, but showed no business ability. After a year, he moved to the country and proceeded to learn farming at a station on the Wimmera River, near Glenorchy, Victoria where his uncle had an interest.

=== Writing career ===
Clarke was already writing stories for the Australian Magazine, when in 1867 he joined the staff of The Argus and The Australasian in Melbourne through the introduction of Dr. Robert Lewins, writing under the heading 'The Peripatetic Philosopher'. He was noted for his vivid descriptions of Melbourne's street scenes and city types, including the "low life" of opium dens, brothels and gambling houses. He always claimed he was interested in the "parti-colored, patch-worked garment of life". These columns brought Clarke to the attention of the public, who enjoyed his schoolboy humor and his popularity as a writer grew. Clarke contributed to many colonial newspapers and he was the local correspondent for the London Daily Telegraph.

In 1868 Clarke founded the Yorick Club, which soon numbered among its members the chief Australian men of letters and 1869 he married the actress Marian Dunn (often "Marion"), daughter of actor and comedian John Dunn, with whom he had six children. Clarke wrote "two sparkling comedies" specially for Marian, A Daughter of Eve and Forbidden Fruit. One of his writing projects at this time was he and Henry Kendall working together to produce the short-lived satirical magazine Humbug (1869–70).

The cover of the 1892 edition of For the Term of His Natural Life, published in London by R. Bentley and Son

Clarke briefly visited Tasmania in 1870 at the request of The Argus to experience at first hand the settings of articles he was writing on the convict period. Old Stories Retold began to appear in The Australasian from February. The following month his great novel His Natural Life (later called For the Term of His Natural Life) commenced serialization in The Australian Journal (which Clarke was editing), and was later published in book form in 1874. For the Term of His Natural Life is a "ripping yarn", which at times relies on unrealistic coincidences. The story follows the fortunes of Rufus Dawes, a young man transported for a theft that he did not commit, when rendering assistance to the victim of a mugging. The harsh and inhumane treatment meted out to the convicts, some of whom were transported for relatively minor crimes, is clearly conveyed. The conditions experienced by the convicts are graphically described. The novel was based on research by the author as well as a visit to the penal settlement of Port Arthur. Clarke originally referred to the novel as "His Unnatural Life." One critic has claimed that Clarke's novel is "the book that, more than any other, has defined our perception of the Australian convict experience.". For the Term of his Natural Life is considered a novel in the grand tradition, that places Clarke with Charles Reade, Victor Hugo and Fyodor Dostoevsky among the great nineteenth-century visionaries who found in the problems of crime and punishment a new insight, especially relevant in the convict-founded Australian colonies, into the foundations of human worth.

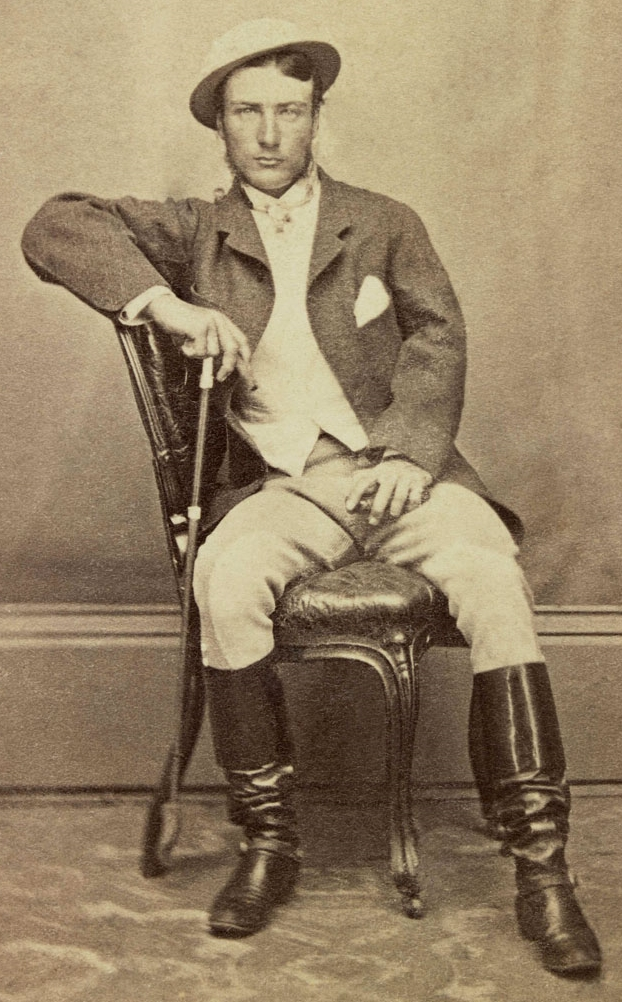
Marcus Clarke, c. 1866

Clarke also wrote The Peripatetic Philosopher (1869), a series of amusing papers reprinted from The Australasian; Long Odds (London, 1870), a novel; and numerous comedies and pantomimes, the best of which was Twinkle, Twinkle, Little Star (Theatre Royal, Melbourne; Christmas, 1873). In spite of his popular success, Clarke was constantly involved in financial difficulties and twice (1874 and 1881) he was forced into insolvency. His financial difficulties in 1874 forced him to sell his furniture and the 574 volumes that made up his personal library.

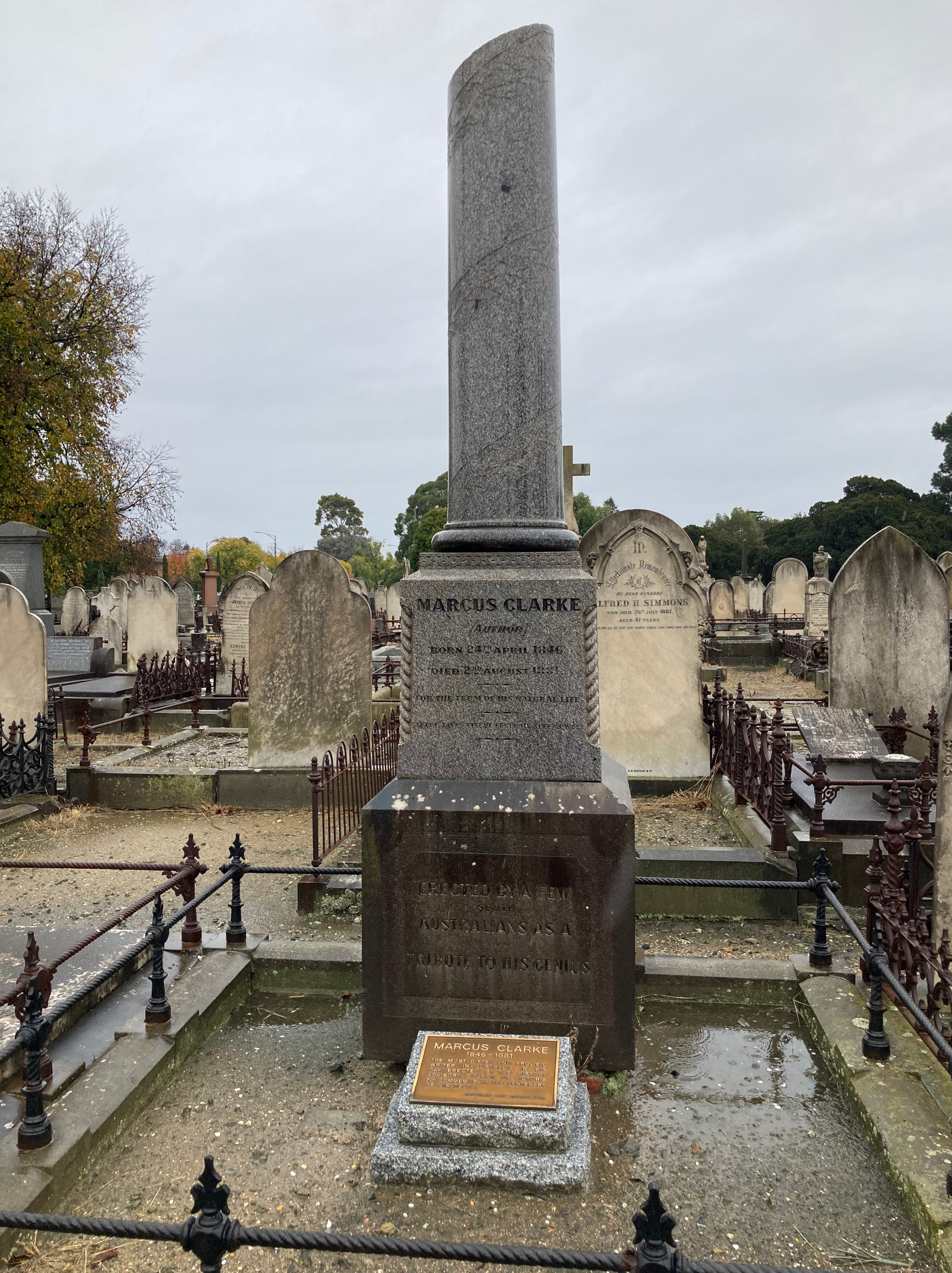
Clarke's grave at Melbourne General Cemetery

In 1872, Clarke was appointed secretary to the trustees of the Melbourne Public Library (now known as State Library Victoria) and in 1876 became sub (assistant) librarian. It is said he carried out his duties with reasonable efficiency but "levity pursued him", and when he applied for the position of Chief Librarian in 1881, he was refused. The library holds a unique collection of papers that relate to Marcus Clarke; the finding aid accessed via the website describes the "correspondence, manuscripts of prose and plays, notebooks, diaries, newspapers and press cuttings, legal documents and other miscellaneous papers and books". As well as holding books, pictures, manuscripts, music scores and journals, two unusual collection items (classified as "Realia") are his death mask and his Cabbage Tree hat. Clarke and his work have been featured in several exhibitions held at the library, most recently "Bohemian Melbourne" (2014) which was attended by over 70,000 visitors.

Clarke was an important literary figure in Australia, and at the centre of a bohemian circle in Melbourne. Among the writers in contact with him were Victor Daley, Thomas Bracken, John Shillinglaw, Henry Kendall, Oliver Wendell Holmes, Julian Thomas, Robert P. Whitworth, Adam Lindsay Gordon and George Gordon McCrae. As well as friends, he also made enemies. These included James Neild and James Smith. In 1877, he served a term as the chairman of the library committee of the Melbourne Athenaeum (founded 1839) the oldest cultural institution in the city.

Anxiety, overwork, disappointment and health problems are said to have hastened his death (officially of erysipelas) in Melbourne on 2 August 1881 at the age of 35. Clarke was buried in Melbourne General Cemetery and in August 1898, a "fine granite monument" was erected over the grave.

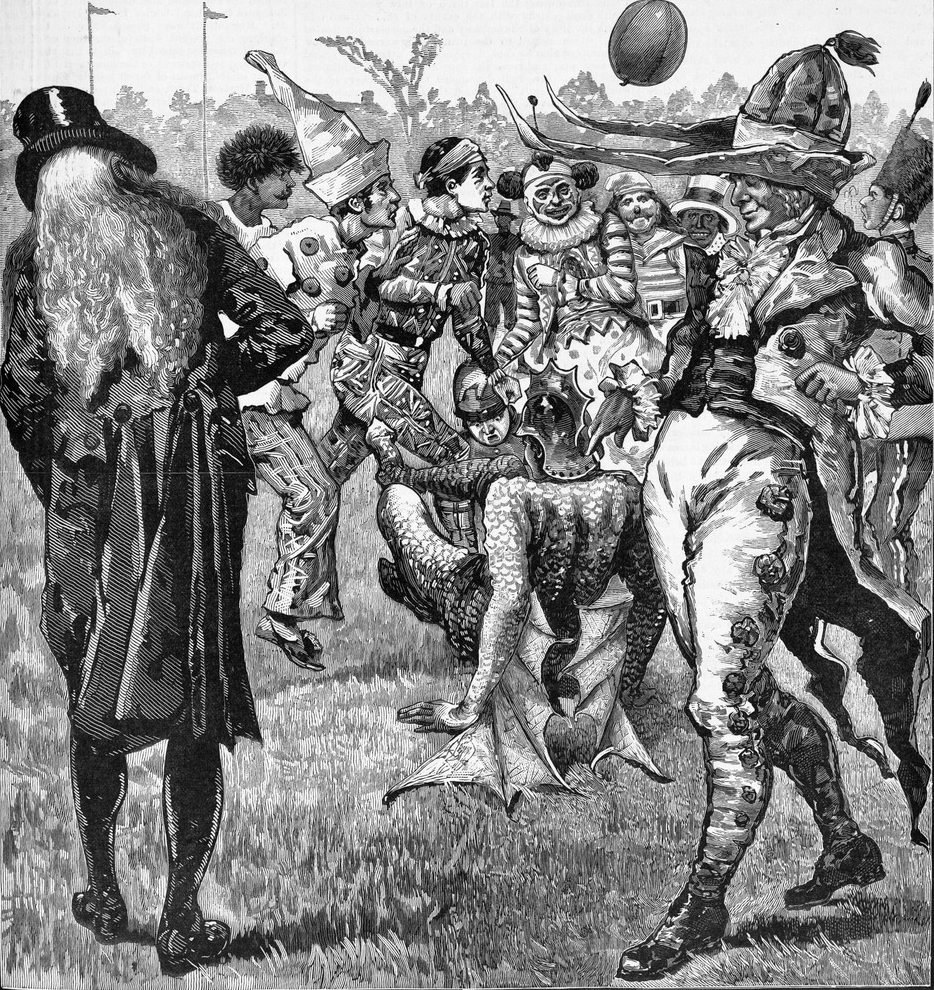
Charity costume Australian rules football match for Clarke's family after his death, East Melbourne Cricket Ground

=== Legacy ===
Shortly after Clarke's death, the theatre community rallied to support his family, organizing a charity costumed Australian rules football match which was held at the East Melbourne Cricket Ground. For two hours "Heroes of familiar opera, tragedy, comedy, farce, and pantomime were banded together in strange juxtaposition. It was as if the silent figures of the Waxworks exhibition has been suddenly stirred to into wild life and energetic action". Whilst the match was not high scoring (the Opera House team kicked six goals, the other team only one), nearly a thousand spectators attended the event, and £74/1/6 was raised.

In 1884 Marcus Clarke Memorial Volume, assembled by his friend and literary executor Hamilton Mackinnon, was published. It contained a "a selection of his most popular journalism with a biographical introduction" with a dedication to the 5th Earl of Rosebery, Archibald Philip Primrose (Prime Minister of England from March 1894 till June 1895) who was a great support of His Natural Life. In a five-page letter to his wife Marian Clarke, dated 16 January 1884, Lord Rosebery states that he had always admired the book, had given copies to his friends and compared it favourably with Oliver Twist and Victor Hugo's works.

== Recognition ==
For the Term of his Natural Life has been translated into Dutch, German, Russian, Swedish, and Chinese. A number of editions were published in Britain and the United States.

Clarke came first in a 1927 newspaper poll in Melbourne to identify the top Australian novelist.

Clarke's life was dramatised in a 40min 1946 radio play Marcus Clarke, written by Brian Elliott. Elliott was a lecturer in Australian history and an expert on Clarke. The play was broadcast to commemorate the hundredth anniversary of Clarke's birth. On the same week Elliott also appeared on air giving a talk about Clarke.

Elliott wrote a full-length biography of Clarke that was published in 1958.

He was also recognised in an episode of the television series Behind the Legend.

Clarke's contribution to Australian literature is recognised in a number of place names. A main street in Canberra City bears his name. Clarke had a holiday home on the outskirts of Melbourne in what is now the suburb of Dingley Village. Marcus Road and Clarke Road in the suburb commemorate his time there.

In 1973 he was honored on a postage stamp bearing his portrait issued by Australia Post and he is one of the writers commemorated with a plaque on the Sydney Writers Walk.

He was inducted into The Australian Media Hall of Fame in 2017.
