= Pip Courtney =

Australian journalist and television presenter

Philippa Jane "Pip" Courtney is an Australian journalist and television presenter. She is known for her work as a reporter and host of the ABC series Landline. In 2000, she became a reporter on The 7.30 Report, but returned to Landline in 2001.

== Career ==
Courtney's father, Michael, was a journalist and editor of The Examiner. She grew up in Launceston, Tasmania, and attended the Launceston Church Grammar School from 1977 to 1982. She then studied politics at the University of Tasmania, where she resided at Christ College and graduated with a Bachelor of Arts in 1986. In 1993, Courtney joined Landline, where she met cameraman John Bean during her first shoot; they married on 28 January 1999. On 18 August 2011, Bean, television journalist Paul Lockyer and pilot Gary Ticehurst died in a helicopter crash while filming at Lake Eyre in South Australia.

In 2011, Courtney received the Star Prize for Broadcast Journalism from the International Federation of Agricultural Journalists for her Landline report, "Pipe Dream", about the coal seam gas industry. In 2014 and 2015, she received Clarion Awards for her reports "Horns of a Dilemma" and "The Big Dry", respectively.
