= Walkley Award for Broadcast Interviewing =

The Walkley Award for Broadcast Interviewing was first presented in 1997, as one of the Walkley Awards. At some point it became the Walkley Award for Broadcast Presenting, until 2001. In 2009 the award category became Walkley Award for Broadcast and Online Interviewing, and in 2013, Walkley Award for Interview.

By 2020 the Award had ceased.

List of winners:

- 1997: Jim Waley, Nightline/Sunday, Nine Network
- 1998: Maxine McKew, Lateline, ABC TV
- 1999: Helen Dalley, Sunday, Nine Network
- 2000: Kerry O'Brien, The 7.30 Report, ABC TV - "East Timor Crisis/Michael Knight/Ruth Cracknell"
- 2001: John Lyons, Sunday, Nine Network - "John Lyons: Television Interviews"
- 2002: Monica Attard, ABC Radio – "Kernot, Beazley, The Bishop"
- 2003: Andrew Denton, Enough Rope, ABC TV - "Rene, Mark, Allan and Jill"
- 2004: Tony Jones, Lateline, ABC TV
- 2005: Monica Attard, Sunday Profile, ABC Radio
- 2006: Steve Cannane, Hack, Triple J - "Petrol Sniffing, Pill Testing and the Cost of War"
- 2007: Tony Jones, Lateline, ABC TV
- 2008: Chris Uhlmann, AM, ABC Radio - "Last Days"
- 2009: Tracy Grimshaw, A Current Affair, Nine Network
- 2010: Kerry O'Brien, ABC TV, - "The Rudd and Abbott interviews"
- 2011: Tony Jones, Lateline, ABC TV - "Christopher Hitchens, Malcolm Turnbull and Chris Bowen"
- 2012: Leigh Sales, 7.30, ABC TV - "Interviews with Tony Abbott, Scott Morrison and Christine Milne"
- 2013: Jenny Brockie, Insight, SBS - "Young Mob"
- 2014: David Speers, Sky News - "What is metadata?"
- 2015: David Speers, Sky News - "The fixer"
- 2016: Caro Meldrum-Hanna, Four Corners, ABC TV - "Jackson and Lawler"

== See also ==
- Walkley Awards
