= Tony Jones (news journalist) =

Australian journalist and TV presenter (born 1955)

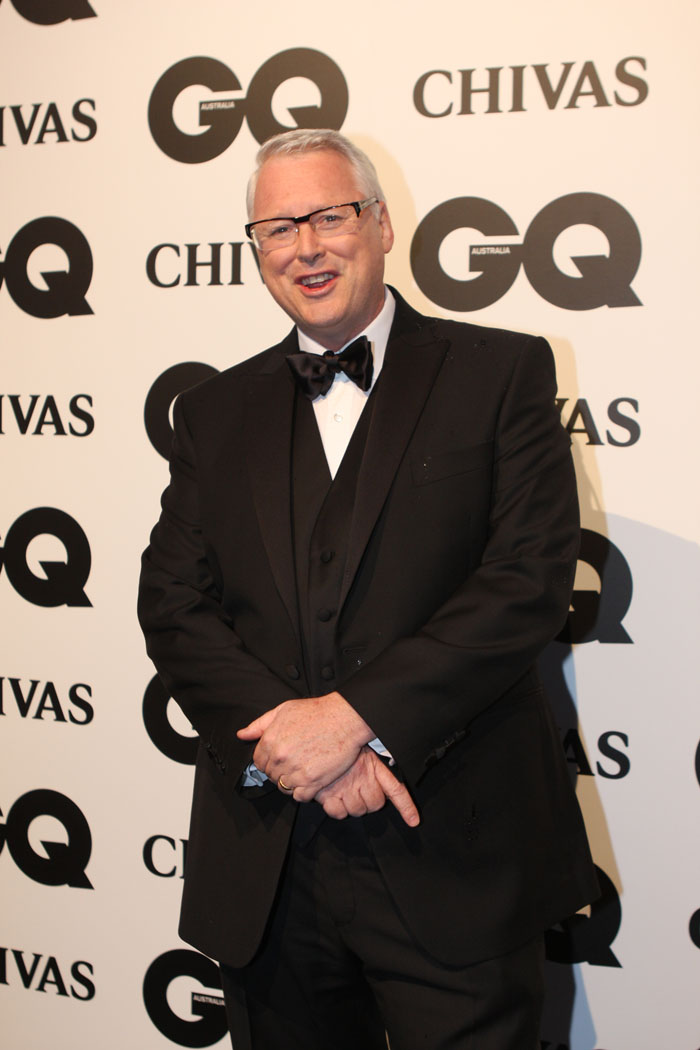
- Jones at the GQ Australia Men of the Year Awards in 2011
- Born: Anthony William Jones; Australia
- Education: Newington College; St Paul's College, University of Sydney
- Occupations: Television presenter and journalist, writer
- Years active: 1985–present
- Known for: Lateline, Dateline, Q&A
- Spouse: Sarah Ferguson (married 1992 or 1993–present)
- Children: 3

Anthony William Jones is an Australian television news and political journalist, radio and television presenter, and writer.

== Early life and education ==
Anthony William Jones attended Newington College from 1970 to 1974.

He was a resident of the males-only St Paul's College at the University of Sydney, where he started a degree in English Honours, but switched to anthropology. He met journalist Francis James after James had come to give a talk at the college, who invited him to his home for a chat the following day, and after spending hours in conversation with James, Jones was convinced that he wanted to become a journalist.

== Career ==
Jones started working for the Australian Broadcasting Corporation (ABC) as a radio current affairs cadet working on the AM, PM and The World Today programs. In 1985, he joined the Four Corners program as a reporter. In 1986, he went to the Dateline program on SBS. He returned to the ABC in 1987, reporting for Four Corners.

In 1990, Jones went to London as the ABC's current affairs correspondent. He covered the collapse of the USSR in Eastern Europe, the Gulf War, the war in the former Yugoslavia, the fall of Kabul to the Mujahadin and the collapse of apartheid. He returned to Australia in 1993 as executive producer of the Foreign Correspondent program. From 1994 to 1996, he was the ABC's correspondent in Washington, D.C., before returning to Foreign Correspondent in 1997. He also covered the war crimes in Bosnia. In mid-1998 he returned to Four Corners.

Jones hosted ABC TV's Lateline news and current affairs program from 1999. From 2011, he hosted the show on Wednesday and Thursday nights and also hosted the ABC's Q&A political panel discussion show. On the Q&A program, Jones regularly hosted national figures from politics, culture and the arts to discuss issues on the national agenda and face questions from a selected audience. He hosted the major party leaders during the 2010 Australian federal election.

Jones is one of Australia's most well known journalists, winning awards including four of Australia's leading journalism awards, the Walkleys. Crikey awarded him "Outstanding Media Practitioner of the Year" in 2005 for "ferocious intelligence, polite calmness, [being a] dogged interrogator, deep political instincts, juggling the running agenda, [and having] a great sense of context." Crikey also put much of the success of Lateline to Jones, stating, "Lateline without Jones is a perfectly adequate late night news review; with Jones it is a world-class piece of television."

In November 2019, the ABC announced that Hamish McDonald would be replacing Jones at Q&A from 2020. Jones hosted his last episode of Q&A on 9 December 2019.

In 2019, Jones joined his wife, Sarah Ferguson, on the production of the ABC documentary series Revelation to write all three episodes.

Jones directed the 2026 documentary, Sentient, on the subject of animal testing. It premiered at the 2026 Sundance Film Festival.

== Personal life ==
Jones married fellow ABC journalist Sarah Ferguson in 1992 or 1993. (Note: Varies depending on source) They met in Paris when Jones engaged Ferguson as a researcher while he was the ABC's UK correspondent. They have two sons together and Jones has another son from a previous relationship.

== Awards ==
- 1987 Walkley Award for Best Television Current Affairs Report for his story Horses for Courses, which was broadcast on the ABC.
- 1991 Walkley Award for Best Coverage of a Current Story (Television), joint winner with Kerry O'Brien and Dugald Maudsley.
- 2004 Walkley Award for Broadcast Interviewing, for his interviews on Lateline.
- 2007 Walkley Award for Broadcast Interviewing, for his interviews on Lateline.
- 2020 Walkley Documentary Award, shared with Sarah Ferguson and Nial Fulton, for Revelation.

== Notes ==
Media offices
Preceded by Maxine McKew	Lateline; Presenter (Wednesday & Thursday); 1999–2016	Succeeded by Emma Alberici
Preceded by Originator	Q&A; Presenter; 22 May 2008 – 9 December 2019	Succeeded by Hamish Macdonald
