= Alberici =

Alberici is an Italian surname. Notable people with the surname include:

- Augusto Alberici, 19th-century Italian painter and antiquarian
- Emma Alberici (born 1970), Australian journalist
- Nuvolone Alberici, 12th-century Italian diplomat and statesman of the early Republic of Genoa
