= List of Australian political memoirs =

This is a list of Australian political memoirs:

== Labor ==
- Father of the House: The Memoirs of Kim E. Beazley by Kim Edward Beazley
- A Cabinet Diary: A Personal Record of the First Keating Government by Neal Blewett (1999)
- Through the Wall: Reflections on Leadership, Love and Survival by Anna Bligh (2015)
- As It Happened by John Button (1998)
- Be Just and Fear Not by Arthur Calwell (1972)
- The Cameron Diaries by Clyde Cameron (1990)
- Thoughtlines: Reflections of a Public Man by Bob Carr (2002)
- Diary of a Foreign Minister by Bob Carr (2014)
- I Do Recall: Reflections on a Social and Political Journey by Jeff Carr (2008)
- My Life and Times by Joe Chamberlain (1998)
- Roosters and Featherdusters by Brian Chatterton (2013)
- The Fights of My Life by Greg Combet (2011)
- Cold Tea for Brandy: A Tale of Protest, Painting and Politics by Joan Coxsedge (2007)
- Public Life, Private Grief: A Memoir of Political Life and Loss by Mary Delahunty (2010)
- Felicia: The Political Memoirs of Don Dunstan by Don Dunstan (1981)
- I Had 50,000 Bosses: Memoirs of a Labor Backbencher 1946-1975 by Gil Duthie (1984)
- Inside the Hawke-Keating Government: A Cabinet Diary by Gareth Evans (2014)
- Big Blue Sky: A Memoir by Peter Garrett (2015)
- Sticks and Stones by Arthur Gietzelt (2014)
- My Story by Julia Gillard (2014)
- The Hawke Memoirs by Bob Hawke (1994)
- Hayden, An Autobiography by Bill Hayden (1996)
- Politics, Death and Addiction by Carolyn Hirsh (2013)
- Crusts and Crusades: Tales of Bygone Days by Billy Hughes (1947)
- Policies and potentates by Billy Hughes (1950)
- A Thinking Reed by Barry Jones (2006)
- Speaking For Myself Again: Four Years With Labor and Beyond by Cheryl Kernot (2002)
- Matters for Judgment: An Autobiography by John Kerr (1978)
- The Latham Diaries by Mark Latham (2005)
- Machine Rules: A Political Primer by Stephen Loosley (2015)
- The Memoirs of Norman John Oswald Makin by Norman Makin (1982)
- Stirring the Possum: A Political Autobiography by Jim McClelland (1989)
- Tales from the Political Trenches by Maxine McKew (2012)
- Carpenter to Cabinet: Thirty-Seven years of Parliament by George Pearce (1951)
- My Reminiscences by George Reid (1917)
- Living Politics by Margaret Reynolds (2007)
- Whatever It Takes by Graham Richardson (1994)
- Not for the Faint-hearted: A Personal Reflection on Life, Politics and Purpose by Kevin Rudd (2017)
- The PM Years by Kevin Rudd (2022)
- Catching the Waves: Life In and Out of Politics by Susan Ryan (1999)
- The Good Fight: Six Years, Two Prime Ministers and Staring Down the Great Recession by Wayne Swan (2014)
- Straight Left by Tom Uren (1995)
- Confessions of a Failed Finance Minister by Peter Walsh (1995)
- Chops for Breakfast: A Lucky Generation in an Age of Accelerating Change by Bob Whan (2014)
- The Truth of the Matter by Gough Whitlam (1979)
- Abiding Interests by Gough Whitlam (1997)

== Liberal ==
Image	Name	Notes	Title	Year	Publisher
	Tony Abbott	Prime Minister 2013-2015	Battlelines	2009	Melbourne University Press
	Sallyanne Atkinson	Lord Mayor of Brisbane 1985-91	No Job for a Woman	2020	University of Queensland Press
	Neil Brown	Deputy Leader of the Liberal Party 1985-87	On the Other Hand: Sketches and Reflections From Political Life	1993	
	Dame Nancy Buttfield	Senator for South Australia 1968-74	Dame Nancy: The Autobiography of Dame Nancy Buttfield	1992	
	Kerry Chikarovski	Leader of the Opposition of New South Wales 1998-2002	Chika	2004	
	Don Chipp	Senator for Victoria 1978-86	Chipp	1987	
	Peter Costello	Treasurer of Australia 1996-2007	The Costello Memoirs	2009	Melbourne University Publishing
	Sir John Cramer	Minister for the Army 1956-63	Pioneers, Politics and People: A Political Memoir	1989	Allen & Unwin
	Gordon Dean	MP for Herbert 1977-83	A Simple Country Lad: A Kind of Autobiography	2007	
	Malcolm Fraser (Note: Co-written with Margaret Simons)	Prime Minister 1975-1983	Malcolm Fraser: The Political Memoirs	2010	The Miegunyah Press
	Jo Gullett	MP for Henty 1946-55	Good Company, Henry "Jo" Gullett: Horseman, Soldier, Politician	1992	
	Billy Hughes	MP for North Sydney 1922-1949, MP for Bradfield 1952	Crusts and Crusades: Tales of Bygone Days	1947	Angus & Robertson
	Billy Hughes	MP for North Sydney 1922-1949, MP for Bradfield 1952	Policies and potentates	1950	Angus & Robertson
	John Howard	Prime Minister 1996-2007	Lazarus Rising: A Personal and Political Autobiography	2011	Harper Collins
	Sir Jim Killen	MP for Moreton 1955-83	Killen: Inside Australian Politics	1985	
	Dame Enid Lyons	MP for Darwin 1943-51	My Life: The Illustrated Autobiography of Dame Enid Lyons	1949	
	Sir Robert Menzies	Prime Minister 1939-41 and 1949-66	Afternoon Light: Some Memories of Men and Events	1968	Cassell Australia
	Sir Robert Menzies	Prime Minister 1939-41 and 1949-66	The Measure of the Years	1970	Cassell Australia
	Brendan Nelson	Leader of the Opposition 2007-08	Of Life and Leadership	2022	
	Jacinta Nampijinpa Price	Senator for the Northern Territory 2022-present, Shadow Minister for Indigenous Australians 2023-2025, Shadow Minister for Defence Industry, Shadow Minister for Defence Personnel and Shadow Minister for Government Efficiency 2025,	Matters of the heart: A memoir	2025	HarperCollins Australia
	Andrew Robb	Minister for Trade and Investment 2013-16	Black Dog Daze: Public Life, Private Demons	2011	
	Malcolm Turnbull	Prime Minister 2015-2018	A Bigger Picture	2020	Hardie Grant

== Other Parties ==
- The Andren Report: An Independent Way in Australian Politics by Peter Andren (2003)
- Cleary, Independent by Phil Cleary (1998)
- The Federal Story: The Inner History of the Federal Cause by Alfred Deakin (1944)
- They Called Me Artie: The Memoirs of Sir Arthur Fadden by Arthur Fadden (1969)
- Backbench: Behind the Headlines by Peter Fisher (2011)
- Untamed and Unashamed: Time to Explain by Pauline Hanson (2007)
- John McEwen: His Story by John McEwen (1982)
- The Tumult and the Shouting by Frank McManus (1977)
- The Peter Nixon Story: An Active Journey by Peter Nixon (2012)
- The Independent Member for Lyne by Rob Oakeshott (2014)
- Truant Surgeon: The Inside Story of Forty Years of Australian Political Life by Earle Page (1963)
- Matters of the heart: A memoir by Jacinta Nampijinpa Price (2025)
- Against the Tide by B. A. Santamaria (1981)
- Having a Go: The Memoirs of Sid Spindler by Sid Spindler (2008)
- Windsor's Way by Tony Windsor (2015)
- Don't You Worry about That! By Sir Joh Bjelke-Petersen (1990)
- Memo for a Saner World by Bob Brown (2004)
- Conversations with Katter: On Politics, life and Things That Matter by Bob Katter (2018)
