= Puccini (disambiguation) =

Giacomo Puccini (1858–1924) was an Italian composer, mainly of operas.

Puccini may also refer to:

== People ==
- Alessandro Puccini (born 1968), Italian fencer
- Biagio Puccini (1673–1721), Italian painter
- Domenico Puccini (1772–1815), Italian composer, grandfather of Giacomo Puccini
- Fausto Puccini (1932–2016), Italian equestrian
- Gianni Puccini (1914–1968), Italian screenwriter and film director
- Jacopo Puccini (1712–1781), Italian composer, great-great-grandfather of Giacomo Puccini
- Jo Puccini, Australian journalist
- Mario Puccini (1869–1920), Italian painter
- Matthew Puccini (born c. 1993), American LGBT filmmaker
- Simonetta Puccini (1929–2017), granddaughter of Giacomo Puccini
- Tommaso Puccini (1749–1811), Italian art historian and gallery director
- Vittoria Puccini (born 1981), Italian film and television actress

== Other uses ==
- Puccini (film), a 1953 Italian film about Giacomo Puccini
- Puccini (crater), a crater on Mercury named after Giacomo Puccini
- Puccini (horse) (foaled 2010), New Zealand racehorse
- 4579 Puccini, a main-belt asteroid named after Giacomo Puccini
- Puccini Spur, a rock spur in Alexander Island, Antarctica, named after Giacomo Puccini

== See also ==
- Puccinia, a genus of fungi
  - List of Puccinia species
