= Chris Uhlmann =

Australian journalist and television presenter

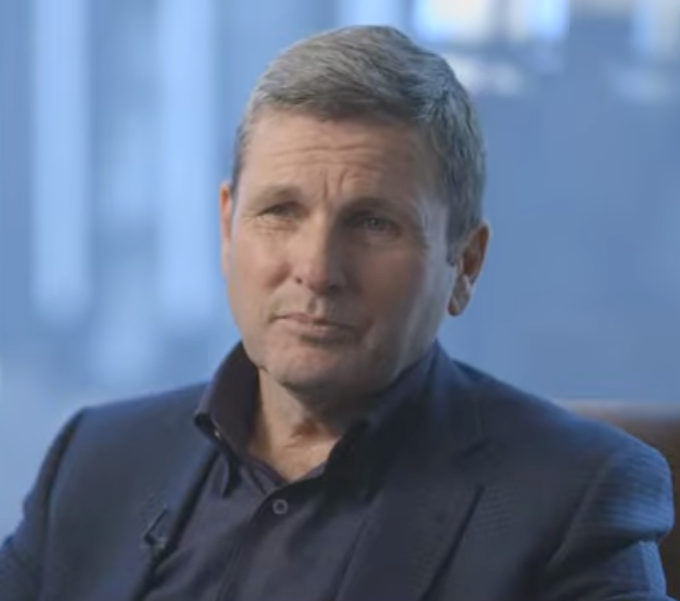
- In a Lowy Institute video in 2017
- Born: Christopher Gerald Uhlmann
- Occupations: Security Guard, Journalist, television presenter
- Years active: 1998−present
- Spouse: Gai Brodtmann

Christopher Gerald Uhlmann is an Australian journalist and television presenter.

== Career ==
Christopher Gerald Uhlmann was formerly a seminarian, a security guard, and a journalist with The Canberra Times before joining the Australian Broadcasting Corporation as a radio producer in 1998.

From 1999 to 2004, Uhlmann co-hosted Local Radio Breakfast on ABC Radio Canberra with David Kilby. In 2005, he was Jon Faine's producer for the Mornings show on ABC Radio Melbourne, and in 2006 was made chief political correspondent for ABC Radio current affairs.

In 2008, Uhlmann switched to television, and was political editor for The 7.30 Report, ABC News, and ABC News channel. In December 2010, he was appointed co-host of the ABC Television current affairs program, 7.30. In 2012, the show was revamped again, with Uhlmann returning to the political editor role, and Leigh Sales hosting the program.

In 2013, Uhlmann stepped down as 7.30's political editor. He announced that he would be working on a documentary about the Rudd and Gillard governments for the ABC.

In February 2014, Uhlmann became the 14th presenter of AM, the ABC Radio news and current affairs program. He took over after Tony Eastley resigned to take up a senior presenter role with the ABC News channel.

In January 2015, Uhlmann was appointed in a newly-created position as ABC News political editor. As a result of the new position Uhlmann left his role as presenter of AM, and was replaced by Michael Brissenden.

In July 2017, Uhlmann's two-minute report for ABC's Insiders on Donald Trump's appearance at the 2017 G20 Hamburg summit went viral, and he was interviewed extensively in the United States, on various television networks.

In August 2017, Uhlmann announced that he would be leaving the ABC to join Nine News as political editor, replacing Laurie Oakes.

In August 2018, amid the 2018 Liberal Party leadership spill, Uhlmann gained popularity again on social media when he appeared on Today, where he stated that the Sky News television channel, 2GB radio station and News Corp Australia were "waging a war" against Prime Minister of Australia Malcolm Turnbull.

Uhlmann retired in October 2022 and Charles Croucher was appointed political editor for Nine News. In April 2024, Uhlmann joined Sky News as a political contributor, and The Australian newspaper as a columnist.

== Awards ==
- 2008: Walkley Award for Broadcast Interviewing

== Politics ==
Uhlmann unsuccessfully contested the ACT 1998 general election for the electorate of Molonglo with the Osborne Independent Group. The conservative group was named after Paul Osborne, who was strongly opposed to abortion, and advocated blocking both euthanasia legislation and any attempt to decriminalise abortion. Osborne and Uhlmann fell out when Osborne moved to severely restrict abortion in the Australian Capital Territory. Six years earlier, Uhlmann had written in support of establishing an abortion clinic in the territory.

== Books ==
With Steve Lewis, Uhlmann has written a series of political novels set in Canberra: The Marmalade Files (2012), The Mandarin Code (2014) and The Shadow Game (2016). These feature a political reporter, Harry Dunkley, investigating a conspiracy involving China, the US and Australian security organisations. In 2016 the first two books were adapted as the Australian television series Secret City, and Harry became Harriet.

== Personal life ==
Uhlmann married Gai Brodtmann, who was an Australian Labor Party member of the House of Representatives for the Division of Canberra from 2010 to 2019.

As of 2021 Brodtmann was a member of the Australian Strategic Policy Institute council.

Media offices
| Preceded by Laurie Oakes | Nine News; Chief political editor 2017–2022 | Succeeded by Charles Croucher |
| Preceded by (none) | ABC News; Political editor 2015–2017 | Succeeded by Andrew Probyn |
| Preceded by Kerry O'Brien as The 7.30 Report | 7.30; Presenter, with Leigh Sales; 2011–2012 | Succeeded by Leigh Sales (solo) |
| Preceded by (none) | ABC News; Chief political editor and host of Capital Hill; 2010 | Succeeded by Lyndal Curtis |
| Preceded by Michael Brissenden | The 7.30 Report; Political editor 2008–2010 | Succeeded by Heather Ewart |
