= John Bean (cinematographer) =

Australian cinematographer

John Bean ACS
- Born: John Wayne Bean; 12 June 1963; Rockhampton, Queensland, Australia
- Died: 18 August 2011 (aged 48); Lake Eyre, South Australia
- Spouse: Pip Courtney (1999–2011; his death)

John Wayne Bean ACS (12 June 1963 – 18 August 2011) was an Australian cinematographer who worked at the Australian Broadcasting Corporation (ABC) for over 20 years.

Bean was born in Rockhampton, Queensland, to Judy (née Suthers) and Colin, a carpenter. He had a younger sister, Tammy. After graduating from Glenmore State High School, he initially studied graphic design at the Queensland College of Art in Brisbane, before he majored in film and television and earned a Diploma in Arts in 1983.

In 1984, Bean started working at regional television station RTQ7 Rockhampton. He then moved to DDQ10 Toowoomba two years later. From 1989 to 1994, he worked in the Canberra Press Gallery.

In 1993, while working as a cameraman for Landline, Bean became friends with reporter Pip Courtney. They married on 23 January 1999.

Bean shot "With This Ring", a 2003 episode of Australian Story.

On 18 August 2011, Bean, television journalist Paul Lockyer and pilot Gary Ticehurst died in a helicopter crash while filming at Lake Eyre in South Australia. In September, Bean was posthumously accredited by the Australian Cinematographers Society to use the ACS designation after his name.

In May 2012, the ABC and Griffith University announced the establishment of the ABC John Bean Memorial Scholarship for Cinematography. Bean had mentored students at the Griffith Film School for four years.
