= Ali Moore =

Australian TV journalist and radio broadcaster

Ali Moore (born 1964) is an Australian TV journalist and radio broadcaster. She has been a reporter, presenter and fill‑in host across multiple ABC and Nine Network programs, including Business Sunday, Today, Lateline Business, ABC News 24 and ABC Radio Melbourne.

== Career ==
Moore began her career in 1987 as a cadet for the Australian Broadcasting Corporation (ABC), where she was active in a number of programs.

In 1996, she moved to the Nine Network, where she was a reporter and eventually presenter of Business Sunday. Shortly after Moore left, Business Sunday merged into the Sunday program.

She was also a fill-in host for Today on Saturday and filled in for Tracy Grimshaw from 1999 until 2003 on Today. The morning after the 11 September attacks in New York, Moore co-hosted the program from 6 am until 11 am bringing in the latest information from the developing story alongside Steve Liebmann.

With Business Sunday's imminent demise in 2006, she opted to leave the network and returned to the ABC. She has previously hosted Lateline Business, and is also a relief presenter on ABC Radio Melbourne and The 7.30 Report on ABC TV.

Moore presented Mornings on ABC Radio Melbourne while Jon Faine was on long service leave for 5½ months in 2008.

In July 2010, Moore began hosting Afternoon Live on ABC News 24. In December 2010, it was announced that Moore would move to Lateline in 2011, filling the vacancy left by Leigh Sales. As a result, she left ABC News 24.

Moore later became a freelance producer and presenter for BBC World News, based in Singapore, working on Newsday and Asia Business Report.

In 2017, she returned to Australia where she acted as a fill in on News Breakfast when Virginia Trioli was away. She was also a fill-in presenter for Mornings on ABC Radio Melbourne.

In 2023, Moore stepped in as the acting Drive presenter on ABC Radio Melbourne. She was confirmed as the permanent host later that year. In May 2026, Moore announced that she would step away from Drive to pursue a new opportunity in Italy. Charlie Pickering replaced her.

Media offices
Preceded by Program Started	Lateline Business; Presenter; 14 August 2006 – 19 May 2010	Succeeded by Ticky Fullerton
Preceded by Program Started	Afternoon Live; Presenter; 23 July 2010 – December 2010	Succeeded by Kim Landers
Preceded by Leigh Sales	Lateline; Presenter (Monday, Tuesday & Friday); 2011	Succeeded by Emma Alberici
