= Paul Lockyer =

Australian journalist

- Born: 27 April 1950; Corrigin, Western Australia
- Died: 18 August 2011 (aged 61); Lake Eyre, South Australia
- Occupations: Reporter, TV presenter
- Years active: 1969–2011
- Spouse: Maria Lockyer
- Children: Jamie (m), Nick (m)

Paul James Lockyer (27 April 1950 – 18 August 2011) was an Australian television journalist for the Australian Broadcasting Corporation and the Nine Network who was known for his reporting on rural and regional Australia. Lockyer and two colleagues died in a helicopter accident while on assignment filming a story about Lake Eyre, South Australia.

== Early years and background ==
Lockyer was the younger of two sons of Nona and Norman Lockyer. He was born and grew up on a farm near Corrigin, about 250 kilometres (160 mi) east of Perth. He later boarded at Aquinas College in Perth where he played hockey.

== Career ==
In 1969 at age 19, Lockyer became a cadet journalist with the Perth office of the Australian Broadcasting Corporation (ABC), before moving to Sydney and then Canberra in the mid-1970s. In 1979 Lockyer became an ABC correspondent in Port Moresby and then Jakarta before a three-year posting in Bangkok. It was during this period that he reported on events following the Vietnam War and the Khmer Rouge killing fields. He was posted to Washington, D.C., where as ABC correspondent during the Reagan administration he covered Central and North America. Lockyer later returned to Asia, taking up a posting in ABC's Singapore office and reporting on the trial and subsequent execution of Kevin Barlow and Brian Chambers on drug trafficking charges. Lockyer was nominated for a Gold Walkley award for his coverage of the trial and execution.

In 1988 he joined the Nine Network in Sydney. Lockyer's reporting on a drought in eastern Australia in 1994 for A Current Affair was credited for inspiring the Farmhand Appeal. He worked across a range of programs for the network including Sunday, Midday, and the Wide World of Sports.

After returning to the ABC in 1999, Lockyer won a Logie Award for Most Outstanding News Reporter in 2001 for his daily coverage of the Sydney 2000 Olympic Games. He later led ABC TV News coverage of the 2004 Athens Olympics and reported on the 2008 Beijing Olympics for the 7.30 Report. In 2005, Lockyer was the presenter for the ABC television news in Western Australia.

However, it was his coverage of rural stories that he was most passionate about. Lockyer's was the first news team to report from Grantham in the Lockyer Valley in the aftermath of the 2010–2011 Queensland floods; for the first 24 hours he was the only reporter on the ground in Grantham. Lockyer also provided in depth coverage of the impact of Cyclone Yasi. Lockyer was awarded the Centenary Medal in 2003 for his coverage of rural issues, particularly the extensive drought and he was twice awarded the NSW Farmers' Association Mackellar Media prize for coverage of rural issues. Lockyer reported the 2006 rescue of two miners from Tasmania's Beaconsfield gold mine.

Lockyer's final story was an interview with Bob Lasseter, who is searching for Lasseter's Reef. Bob Lasseter is the son of Harold Lasseter, the man who claimed to have originally found the gold deposit. The story was broadcast on 7.30, on 29 August 2011.

== Death ==
On 18 August 2011, Lockyer and two fellow ABC employees, pilot Gary Ticehurst and cameraman John Bean, died in a helicopter crash on the eastern shore of Lake Eyre in South Australia. The trio were on assignment filming a story about the lake. The aircraft was an Aérospatiale Industries AS355F2 helicopter owned by the ABC. The Australian Transport Safety Bureau conducted an investigation into the fatal accident, finding the probable cause to be spatial disorientation of the pilot, during a period of high workload shortly after taking off for a VFR flight on a dark night. The accident was the first fatal accident involving a twin-engine helicopter in Australia since 1986.

Addressing Parliament, the Prime Minister, Julia Gillard, spoke of Lockyer's coverage of important events, his famous inland reports and his reporting of the 2010–2011 Queensland floods. She spoke of the dangers journalists were exposed to, saying "[They] took these risks and told these stories. They were true professionals and true gentlemen of the Australian media."

The renowned artist John Olsen, who was a regular visitor to Lake Eyre, had been invited to be a member of the helicopter party, but declined due to ill-health. He later offered a painting and a poem in memory of those killed.

== Personal life ==
One of Lockyer's two sons, Nick, is a sports journalist with the Australian Broadcasting Corporation.

== Selected works ==
- "Feud continues over water". 7.30 Report. Australia. 13 April 2005. Archived from the original (transcript) on 13 November 2012.
- "Floods reignite water feuds" (transcript). 7.30 Report. Australia. 19 February 2008.
- "Agriculture holds strong against the recession" (transcript). 7.30 Report. Australia. 15 April 2009.
- "Lake Eyre region blossoms after decade long drought" (transcript). 7.30 Report. Australia. 18 May 2009.
- "Explosion of life as rivers run in Central Australia" (transcript). 7.30 Report. Australia. 14 June 2010.
- "150th anniversary of Burke and Wills" (transcript). 7.30 Report. Australia. 18 August 2010.
- "Nature's fury" (transcript). 7.30 Report. Australia. 7 December 2010.
- "Long wet summer" (transcript). 7.30 Report. Australia. 17 December 2010.
- "St George swamped" (transcript). 7.30 Report. Australia. 6 January 2011.
- "Flood deaths in Toowoomba" (transcript). 7.30 Report. Australia. 10 January 2011.
- "A Town in Shock" (video). 7.30 Report. Australia. 11 January 2011.
- "Lockyer Valley tragedy" (video). 7.30 Report. Australia. 13 January 2011.
- "After the Deluge". ABC1. Australia. 2011. Archived from the original (video) on 18 August 2011.
- "Return to Grantham" (transcript). Landline (ABC TV). Australia. 7 August 2011.

== Tribute works ==
- Eastley, Tony (19 August 2011). "Paul Lockyer remembered" (video). Lateline. Australia.
