= Stutchbury =

Stutchbury is a surname. Notable people with the surname include:

- Bridget Stutchbury, Canadian biologist
- Carolina Stutchbury (born 2005), American fencer
- Michael Stutchbury (born 1957), editor in chief of The Australian Financial Review
- Oliver Stutchbury (1927-2011), British politician.
- Peter Stutchbury (born 1954), Australian architect
- Samuel Stutchbury (1798-1859), English naturalist and geologist
