= Sentient (film) =

2026 Australian documentary film

- Directed by: Tony Jones
- Written by: Tony Jones; Rachel Grierson-Johns
- Produced by: Ivan O'Mahoney
- Release date: 26 January 2026 (Sundance)
- Running time: 105 minutes
- Country: Australia
- Language: English

Sentient is a 2026 Australian documentary film directed by Tony Jones and written by Jones and Rachel Grierson-Johns, and produced by Ivan O'Mahoney. The film premiered in the World Cinema Documentary Competition at the 2026 Sundance Film Festival.

At the APRA Music Awards of 2026, music by Helena Czajka was nominated for Best Music for a Documentary.

== Premise ==
The film investigates laboratory research on animals and follows Dr. Lisa Jones Engel, a primatologist turned animal welfare advocate, as it questions whether harming animals and ourselves in the name of science is justified.

== Release ==
Sentient premiered as a world premiere in the World Cinema Documentary Competition at the 2026 Sundance Film Festival, held 22 January to 1 February 2026. Competition titles are included in the festival's at-home program, which runs 29 January to 1 February 2026.

== Production ==
Dogwoof acquired world sales rights to the film in December 2025.
