= Horace (crater) =

Crater on Mercury

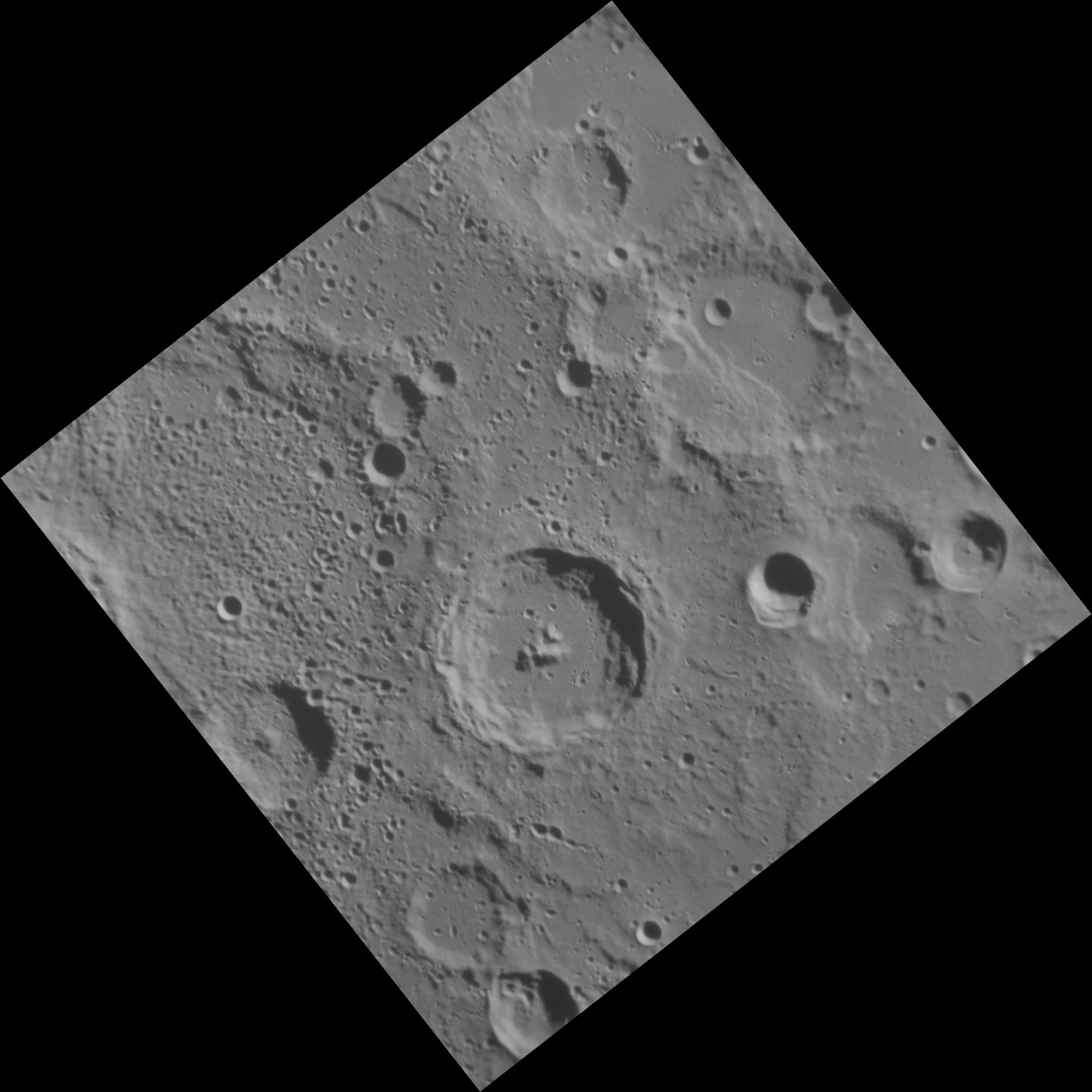
- MESSENGER NAC image. Horace is near center.
- Feature type: Impact crater
- Location: Bach quadrangle, Mercury
- Coordinates: 69.34°S 50.02°W
- Diameter: 56 km (35 mi)
- Eponym: Horace

Horace is a crater on Mercury. Its name was adopted by the International Astronomical Union (IAU) in 1976. Horace is named for the Ancient Roman poet Horace, who lived from 65 BCE to 8 BCE.

To the west of Horace is the crater Spitteler, and to the north is Puccini.
