= Quentin Dempster =

Australian journalist and author

Quentin Dempster AM, is an Australian journalist and author.

== Career ==
Dempster began his career as a cadet on the Maryborough Chronicle in Queensland, and moved to Brisbane's Telegraph, where he became the paper's chief political reporter.

In 1982, he was awarded the Australian Journalists' Association's gold honour badge for meritorious service.

=== ABC ===
Dempster joined the ABC in 1984. He reported the Fitzgerald Inquiry in Queensland and the Wood Royal Commission into the NSW Police Service.

After joining the ABC he wrote and produced The Sunshine System, a documentary on institutionalised corruption in the Sunshine State, which exposed how senior police made hundreds of thousands of dollars a year from bribes and kickbacks linked to organised crime. The Sunshine System's revelations gave impetus to calls for a commission of inquiry into political and police corruption. The inquiry, headed by Tony Fitzgerald QC, ran from 1987 to 1989, and Dempster's re-enactments and analysis on the national 7.30 Report program brought the issue to a wide audience.

In 1990, Dempster moved to Sydney to become the 7.30 Report's NSW presenter, heading a national investigative unit for the program in 1995 and covering the Wood Royal Commission into police corruption south of the Tweed.

Dempster was made a member of the Order of Australia in 1992 for services to the media. In 2002, he was awarded the Walkley Award for outstanding contribution to journalism. On 28 November 2014, Dempster said he would present the final edition of 7.30 NSW "next Friday", promising the show would go out "with a bang".

Dempster made the announcement at the end of 28 November's Friday night's 7.30 NSW program, a show which was being axed under the ABC cuts strategy outlined by managing director Mark Scott that week. "After almost 20 years the ABC is discontinuing your local show. Thank you for your support, stories ideas and constructive criticism over all this time," Dempster told viewers. "I will be leaving the ABC after 30 years. It has been an honour to work with Australia's great and unique public broadcaster. Next week we'll be going out with bang, so, hope to see you then. Bye bye."

Dempster was asked by Nick Grimm on The World Today: "We'll be seeing you, I take it, this week on the New South Wales edition of 7.30?"

He replied: "I'm waiting to get my white envelope, so I expect so. I'm sure I would have been told if my services weren't required for the next two scheduled programs of 7.30 New South Wales." ABC director of news Kate Torney said Dempster's departure was a "huge loss" and described his coverage of corruption in Queensland and New South Wales as "exemplars of the fearless and forensic journalism which has earned Quentin the respect and admiration of his peers and the gratitude of his viewers".

== Bibliography ==
- Dempster, Quentin (1992). Honest cops : revealing accounts of Australians who stood up to corruption and suffered the consequences. Australian Broadcasting Corporation. Sydney: ABC Enterprises. ISBN 0-7333-0138-X. OCLC 27605531.
- Dempster, Quentin (1997). Whistleblowers. Sydney, NSW: ABC Books. ISBN 0-7333-0504-0. OCLC 37313915.
- Dempster, Quentin (2000). Death struggle. Crows Nest, NSW: Allen & Unwin. ISBN 1-86508-037-3. OCLC 45741476.
