= Jo Puccini =

Australian journalist

- Occupation: Journalist / executive producer
- Years active: 1995–present
- Known for: Executive Producer of 7.30 Four Corners Media Watch

Jo Puccini is an Australian journalist and since 2017 the Editor of ABC Investigations. From 2015 she was executive producer for the ABC for the nightly current affairs programme 7.30.

== Career ==
Puccini worked as a researcher and producer with the Seven Network on shows like Today Tonight, The Times and Witness, before joining the ABC's Media Watch as a researcher in 2000. While at the ABC’s Four Corners (2002–2007) Puccini won three Walkley Awards for journalism. Puccini was appointed Executive Producer for 7.30 in 2015 replacing Sally Neighbour. In 2017 she was appointed Editor of ABC Investigations.

=== Overview ===
- 2000 Media Watch, Researcher
- 2001 Four Corners, Researcher, Producer and Associate Producer
- 2008 Media Watch, Executive Producer
- 2010 Lateline, Supervising Producer
- 2012 7.30, Commissioning Editor
- 2013 ABC, Editor for the National Reporting Team
- 2015 7.30, Executive Producer
- 2017 Editor, ABC Investigations

== Awards ==
While at Four Corners Puccini was joint winner of three Walkley Awards for excellence in journalism.

- 2002 Walkley Award (All Media) – Social Equity Journalism – Highly Commended, with Liz Jackson and Morag Ramsay, 'Putting The Children At Risk', Australian Broadcasting Corporation
- 2003 Walkley Award (Television) – TV Current Affairs, Feature, Documentary Or Special (More Than 20 Minutes) with Debbie Whitmont – 'About Woomera', Australian Broadcasting Corporation
- 2005 Walkley Award (All Media) – International Journalism, with Sally Neighbour and Lin Buckfield, 'The Kilwa Incident', Australian Broadcasting Corporation
