= Kirki (tanker) =

Oil tanker causing the oil spill outside of Australia on 21 July 1991

- Neil Eliot's Walkley Award-winning photograph of the Kirki after her front fell off.

History

Greece (as of 1991)
- Name: Kirki
- Owner: Kirki Shipping Corporation SA
- Operator: Mayamar Marine Enterprises of Liberia
- Port of registry: Piraeus
- Completed: 1969
- In service: 1969
- Out of service: 1991
- Fate: Broken up for scrap in Singapore

General characteristics
- Type: Supertanker (Aframax)
- Tonnage: 97,000 GT
- Capacity: 82,650 t (81,340 long tons; 91,110 short tons)
- Crew: 37

Kirki was a 210-metre-long (690 ft) Greek-registered oil tanker which caught fire in the early morning of 21 July 1991, 30 km (19 mi; 16 nmi) west of the fishing town of Cervantes, Western Australia, causing what at the time was the worst oil spill to have occurred in Australian waters. The ship encountered severe weather and rough seas, which caused leaks and a buildup of water in the ballast, creating unanticipated strain on the structure. The ship's bow tore off, rupturing the forward storage tanks and releasing an oil spill estimated at 17,700 tons, or 5.2 million imperial gallons (24 million litres) into the environment. The oil then caught fire, ignited by damaged electrical cables that were short-circuiting on the severed part of the bow.

The crew sent out a distress call at 3:02am on 21 July. After it became clear how dire the situation was, the crew of 37 were evacuated by Australian rescue helicopters over the next few hours. After the fire was confirmed to be extinguished, the still-leaking ship was towed to Cape Preston by a number of tugboats and an oil rig support vessel, the Lady Kathleen, where the remaining light crude oil and heavy fuel oil were transferred to another tanker, the Flying Clipper, on 18 August. Kirki was then towed to Singapore, where she was drydocked and dismantled for scrap.

The condition of the ship was described as "very sick" by the salvage team, including repetitious and persistent equipment failure. The Australian government investigation identified many issues, including the ballast tank lids had rusted through and the holes had been covered in canvas and painted on both sides to hide the condition on the lids.

An image by freelance photographer Neil Eliot depicting the crippled ship without its bow, and with a "fireball exploding out of" its broken front section, was adjudged the winner of the 1991 Walkley Award for Best News Photograph. A posthumous online tribute to Eliot describes the image as 'graphically bringing home the full drama of the occasion'.

The incident was also the subject of a now-famous sketch on Australian comedy program Clarke and Dawe, titled "The Front Fell Off".
