= Clarke and Dawe =

Australian comedy program

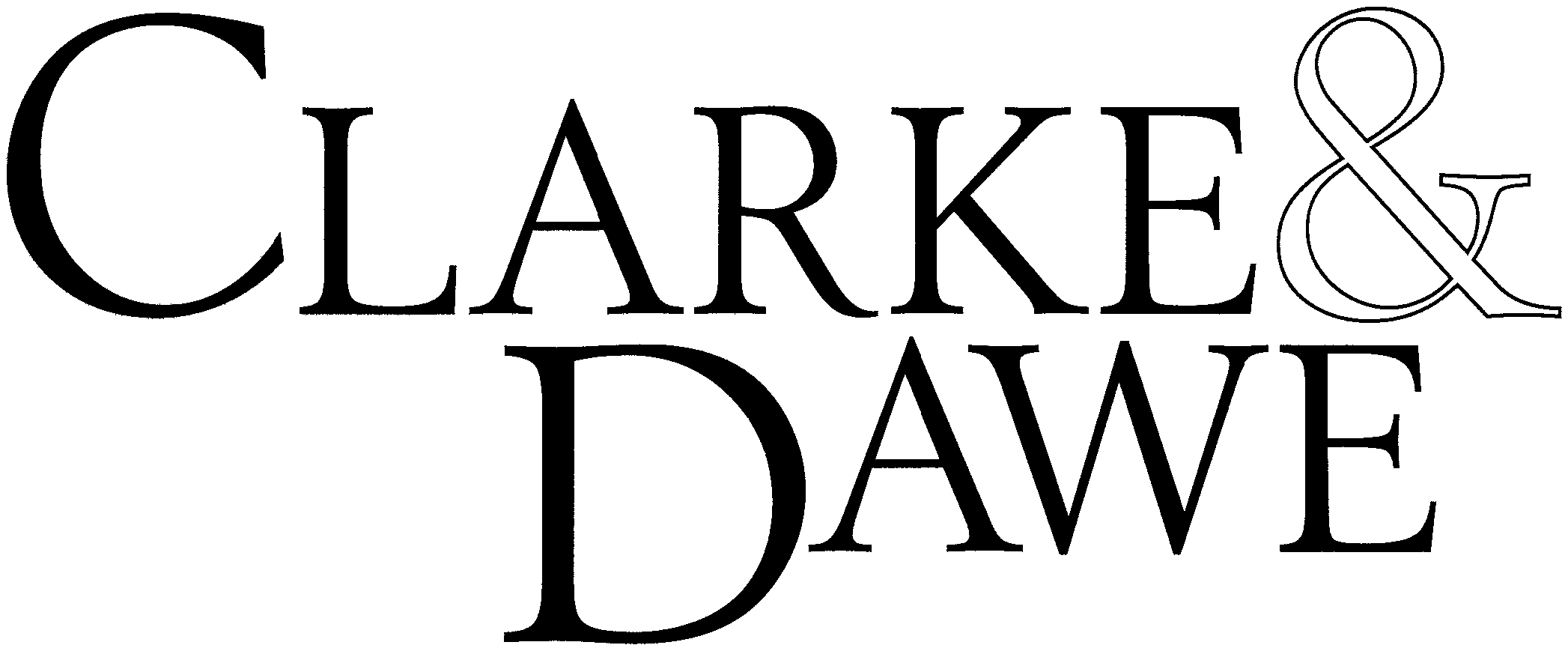
- Genre: News satire Political satire
- Starring: John Clarke; Bryan Dawe
- Country of origin: Australia
- Original language: English

Production
- Camera setup: Multiple
- Running time: 2–5 minutes

Original release
- Network: Nine Network (1989–1996); ABC TV (2000–2017)
- Release: February 1989 – 20 April 2017

Related
- A Current Affair; The 7.30 Report; 7.30

Clarke and Dawe (also stylized as Clarke & Dawe) is an Australian news satire television program that originally aired on the Nine Network from 1989 to 1996 and later on ABC TV from 2000 until 2017. Almost all episodes feature comedians John Clarke and Bryan Dawe engaging in a mock interview, with Dawe playing the interviewer and Clarke playing the interviewee.

The program started out on ABC Radio in 1987, after Dawe, at the time head of the ABC radio comedy unit, had approached Clarke, who had previously written mock interviews as columns for The Times on Sunday, about bringing this type of comedy to radio. Clarke in turn asked Dawe if he could read the questions, finding Dawe had "a supernatural understanding of speech rhythm". Their first interviews featured Clarke as British royal Prince Charles and American actress Meryl Streep.

In February 1989, with the support of host Jana Wendt, Clarke and Dawe made its television debut as part of A Current Affair on the Nine Network, where the program would continue to air for eight years, until 1996. One of their episodes from this period, The Front Fell Off, featuring Clarke as Australian politician Bob Collins on the topic of a 1991 oil spill off the Australian coast, garnered widespread attention years later, when the video was circulated by some on the internet as real, eventually prompting fact-checking website Snopes to debunk it.

In 2000, the program re-emerged as part of the 7.30 Report on ABC-TV (later renamed ABC1 and ABC TV), where it remained in place when the 7.30 Report was replaced by 7.30 in 2011. In 2012, plans emerged to scrap the interview format and instead feature comedian Chas Licciardello, but the program ultimately remained. The last episode aired on 20 April 2017, after Clarke's death on 9 April, having been recorded on 5 April. The episode features Clarke as Richard Shinnery, a fictional consultant for Australia's National Broadband Network.

== See also ==
- The Gillies Report
- The Games (Australian TV series)
- Bremner, Bird and Fortune (British television show of a similar nature)
