= Maxine McKew =

Australian politician

The Honourable Maxine McKew AM
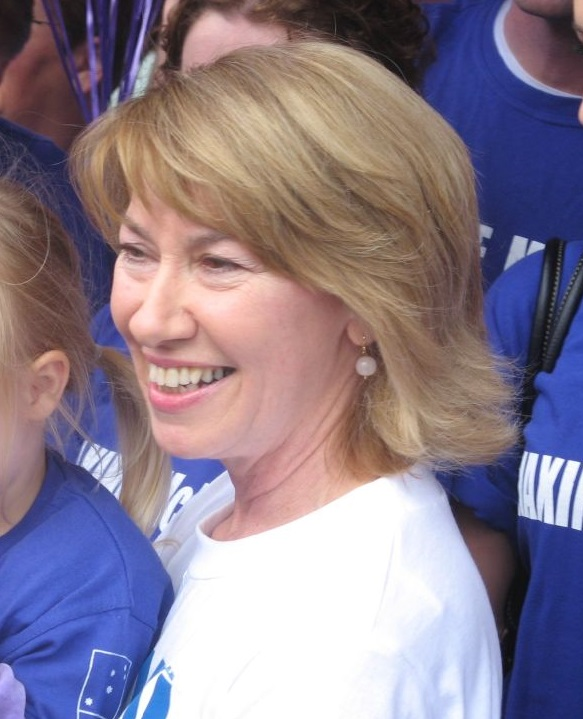
- McKew campaigning in the 2007 federal election.

Member of the Australian Parliament for Bennelong
- In office 24 November 2007 – 21 August 2010
- Preceded by: John Howard
- Succeeded by: John Alexander

Personal details
- Born: Maxine Margaret McKew; 22 July 1953 (age 73) Brisbane, Queensland, Australia
- Party: Labor
- Domestic partner: Bob Hogg
- Occupation: Academic
- Profession: Journalist
- Website: maxinemckew.com.au

Maxine Margaret McKew AM (born 22 July 1953) is an Australian former Labor politician and journalist; she was the Parliamentary Secretary for Infrastructure, Transport, Regional Development and Local Government in the First Rudd Ministry and the First Gillard Ministry.

Between 2007 and 2010, she was the member of the House of Representatives for the Division of Bennelong, New South Wales. Until 2007, the seat was held by the then Prime Minister John Howard, who had been the member for 33 years. She was only the second person to unseat a sitting Australian prime minister since Jack Holloway defeated Stanley Bruce in 1929; and the third person to unseat the leader of a major party, after Neville Newell defeated Charles Blunt, leader of the National Party, in 1990. At the 2010 Federal election she lost her seat to the Liberal Party candidate, John Alexander.

Before entering politics, McKew was an award-winning broadcast journalist. She hosted a number of programs on Australian Broadcasting Corporation (ABC) television and radio, most recently Lateline and The 7.30 Report.

== Personal ==
McKew was born and grew up in Brisbane, Queensland where her father, Bryan McKew, was a boilermaker. When McKew was five, her mother Elaine died, and McKew was sent to live with her grandparents for three years. McKew and her sister Margo moved to Moorooka to live with their father after he remarried; later attending All Hallows' School in Brisbane.

McKew currently lives in the Sydney suburb of Epping with her partner, former ALP National Secretary Bob Hogg. McKew is Roman Catholic and Hogg is divorced; consequently, they have chosen not to marry. McKew had previously indicated active plans to move into the electorate of Bennelong, before doing so in March 2007.

On 3 March 2007, allegations of death threats against McKew were widely reported. There has been speculation that attempts to tamper with her car were by car thieves looking for spare parts rather than by politically motivated individuals.

== Media career ==
After graduating from high school, she briefly attended university before dropping out and living in London for two years. She supported herself with a variety of temporary jobs, including relief typing at a London BBC office. A letter requesting a job—written by McKew on BBC letterhead paper—was rewarded with a cadetship at the Australian Broadcasting Corporation (ABC) in Brisbane in 1974 following a brief stint as a news analyst at the investment bank Goldman Sachs. In 1976 she moved on to host This Day Tonight, a local current affairs program.

In the late 1980s, McKew worked for Ten News as a political reporter before returning to the ABC.

McKew appeared as herself in the eighth episode of the first series, and in the sixth episode of the second series of the Australia television series The Games.

In over 30 years working at the ABC, McKew worked as a presenter on the 7:30 Report and Lateline, and also worked on The Carleton-Walsh Report, AM, PM, and The Bottom Line. McKew was honoured for her broadcasting work with a Logie award, and for her journalism by a Walkley Award. In October 2006 she announced that she was leaving the ABC saying "This is more than likely the end of my broadcasting career".

From 1999 to 2004 she wrote Lunch with Maxine McKew, a column for The Bulletin, a weekly magazine, based on her interviews with prominent Australians. McKew frequently elicited newsworthy revelations from her subjects, and was named by The Australian Financial Review as "one of the top ten exercisers of covert power in Australia".

Following her election as the member for Bennelong in 2007, the Canberra Times had a photo of McKew in a Basic Instinct moment, referring to the scene where Sharon Stone was allegedly not wearing underwear.

== Politics ==
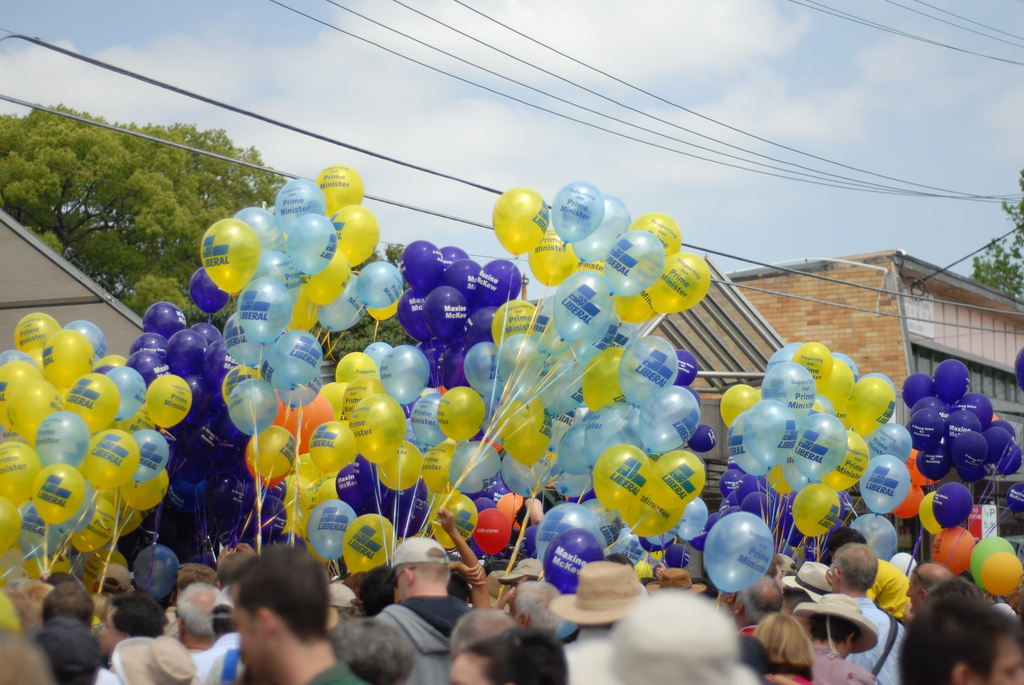
Balloons demonstrating the extent of the electioneering that occurred in Bennelong at the 2007 federal election.

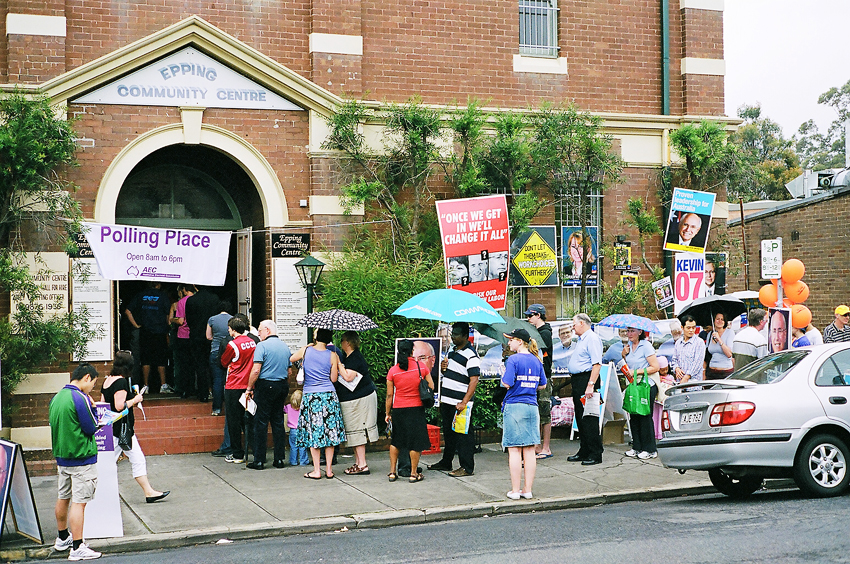
A polling booth in Epping at the 2007 federal election in Bennelong.

McKew was reported to have been a possible Labor candidate for the safe federal seat of Fowler at both the 2001 and 2004 elections. In 2004, it was the Labor leader Mark Latham who attempted to lure McKew with preselection to the western Sydney seat. Latham recorded in his diary that his efforts failed because the broadcaster would not move from her home in Mosman to Labor's outer-suburban heartland, an area which he represented as the Member for Werriwa, while McKew told ABC Radio that a big factor in her 2003 decision was that she regarded the party as being without direction at the time. McKew had also been approached by John Hewson in the past to join the Liberal Party.

After resigning from the ABC in December 2006, McKew joined the Australian Labor Party in January 2007 as a special adviser on strategy to Labor leader Kevin Rudd. The Australian reported in early February that McKew was again in contention to gain preselection for the Division of Fowler, a safe Labor seat held by Julia Irwin who had supported Kim Beazley in the December leadership ballot. However the article also stated that a Labor source had suggested that a different seat was possible.

=== Contest for the seat of Bennelong ===
On 25 February Rudd's office confirmed that McKew would run against Prime Minister John Howard in the Division of Bennelong at the election, and McKew announced that she and Hogg were selling their Mosman home. The seat had once been a Liberal stronghold (it had been in Liberal hands since its creation in 1949), but it had shifted increasingly to Labor in recent years. Howard had held the seat since 1974, but in two out of the three elections he had fought since becoming prime minister, he'd needed to go to preferences to win another term in his own seat.

McKew outlined her position on issues such as the environment, education and women in The Bulletin in mid-2007.

Following a redistribution in 2006, the already marginal Liberal seat had become slightly more so, with Labor needing a swing of 4 percent to win it. This placed Bennelong just barely on the edge of seats that would likely fall to Labor in the event it won government. However, much of the area was already represented by Labor at the state level. A previous week's Morgan poll conducted for the website Crikey put Labor's two-party preferred vote in the seat at 55%. The state of play in the battle for the electorate, as it was on 12 October 2007, had leaked polls showing McKew with an edge over the Prime Minister.

On 24 November 2007, it was obvious when the first returns came in that the contest would be very tight. The ABC and several other sources projected Bennelong as a Labor gain, and Howard himself said in conceding the election to Rudd that it was "very likely" he had been unseated. However, McKew hesitated to claim victory, saying that the seat was on a "knife edge." In a press conference held on 26 November, McKew declared Bennelong "a Labor seat for the first time", but stopped short of formally claiming victory. Earlier Antony Green said there was "no doubt" McKew had won.

On 1 December 2007, while counting was still under way, McKew formally claimed victory in Bennelong, saying that she was "comfortably ahead" on the two-party vote. In her victory speech, McKew thanked Howard for his 30 years of service and could understand why he hadn't formally conceded, saying that "Mr. Howard and his family clearly had a huge amount to do this week." She said that her polling numbers indicated a uniform swing to Labor, with many people who had never voted Labor before crossing over to her. However, she said that many voters felt neglected by him in recent years. By most estimates Howard would have needed an improbable majority of the outstanding mail-in and absentee ballots to retain his seat.

It was not until 12 December that Howard formally conceded defeat, with the Electoral Commission formally declaring McKew the winner by 44,685 votes (51.4 percent) to Howard's 42,251 (48.6 percent). The final tally indicated that McKew had won victory on the 14th count due to a large flow of Green preferences to her; 3,793 (78.84 percent) of Green voters listed McKew as their second preference. This was enough for her to defeat Howard by 2.8 percentage points on the two-party vote.

=== Appointment as a Parliamentary Secretary ===
A few days earlier, on 29 November, Rudd announced that McKew would be one of his Parliamentary Secretaries when his ministry was sworn in on 3 December. In this role she had responsibility for early childhood education and child care. Less than a week after the official declaration of her victory, McKew launched a book and described the Howard era of government as one characterised by "brutish" politics.

Maxine McKew delivered her first speech in the House of Representatives on 14 February 2008.

On 6 June 2009, in a ministerial reshuffle brought on as a result of the resignations of the Defence Minister, Joel Fitzgibbon, and the Parliamentary Secretary for Health, Senator Jan McLucas, Maxine McKew became Parliamentary Secretary for Infrastructure, Transport, Regional Development and Local Government.

=== Electoral defeat ===
McKew was defeated at the 2010 federal election, losing the seat of Bennelong to John Alexander, her opponent from the Liberal Party. She suffered a swing against her of more than 5 per cent, remarking as she conceded defeat that Labor's national campaign 'left a lot to be desired'.

== Post-political career ==
McKew works for Social Ventures Australia, advising on education issues, and is a Vice Chancellor's Fellow at the University of Melbourne.

In 2012, she wrote a political memoir entitled Tales from the Political Trenches. McKew's account of her life in politics is highly critical of the leadership decisions and internal culture of the Federal ALP.

McKew is a long-term participant in the Australian-American Leadership Dialogue, a bipartisan bilateral civil diplomatic initiative founded by Melbourne businessman Phil Scanlan. She also serves as a Distinguished Fellow of the Australia India Institute.

Her other activities include membership of the Women's Advisory Group to the National Breast Cancer Centre, and membership of the University of Sydney's Research Institute for Asia Pacific. She is a member of the Sydney Symphony Council, and was the Patron of Osteoporosis Australia.

Until April 2024, McKew sat on an advisory board to the State Library Victoria. While a member, she was involved in the Teen Writing Bootcamp controversy. Emails obtained under the Freedom of Information Act revealed McKew had encouraged the scrutinising of Lebanese Australian Muslim poet Omar Sakr's social media to monitor his support of Palestine and views about the Gaza war. She added: "It doesn’t mean we vet everyone for their social and political views, but it does mean on a subject such as Gaza/Israel we have a duty to be absolutely thorough and super careful about the way language is used by the people we engage. We need to be alert to what’s said and what’s not said." After this was made public, McKew told The Guardian that her decisions were informed by "the policy of political neutrality which covers all the major Victorian cultural institutions" that the library had been "entirely consistent" in applying.

== Honours ==
- 1998 Walkley Award for Broadcast Interviewing for her work on Lateline
- 1999 Logie Award for Most Outstanding News-Public Affairs Broadcaster
- Named as "Columnist of the Year" by the Magazine Publishers Association in 2003.
- Appointed a Member of the Order of Australia in the 2023 King's Birthday Honours for "significant service to journalism, to higher education, and to the Parliament of Australia".

Parliament of Australia
Preceded by John Howard	Member for Bennelong; 2007–2010	Succeeded by John Alexander
Media offices
Preceded by originator	Lateline; Presenter (Friday); 2001–2006	Succeeded by Virginia Trioli
Preceded by Kerry O'Brien	Lateline; Presenter; 1995–1999	Succeeded by Tony Jones
