= Holberg (crater) =

Crater on Mercury

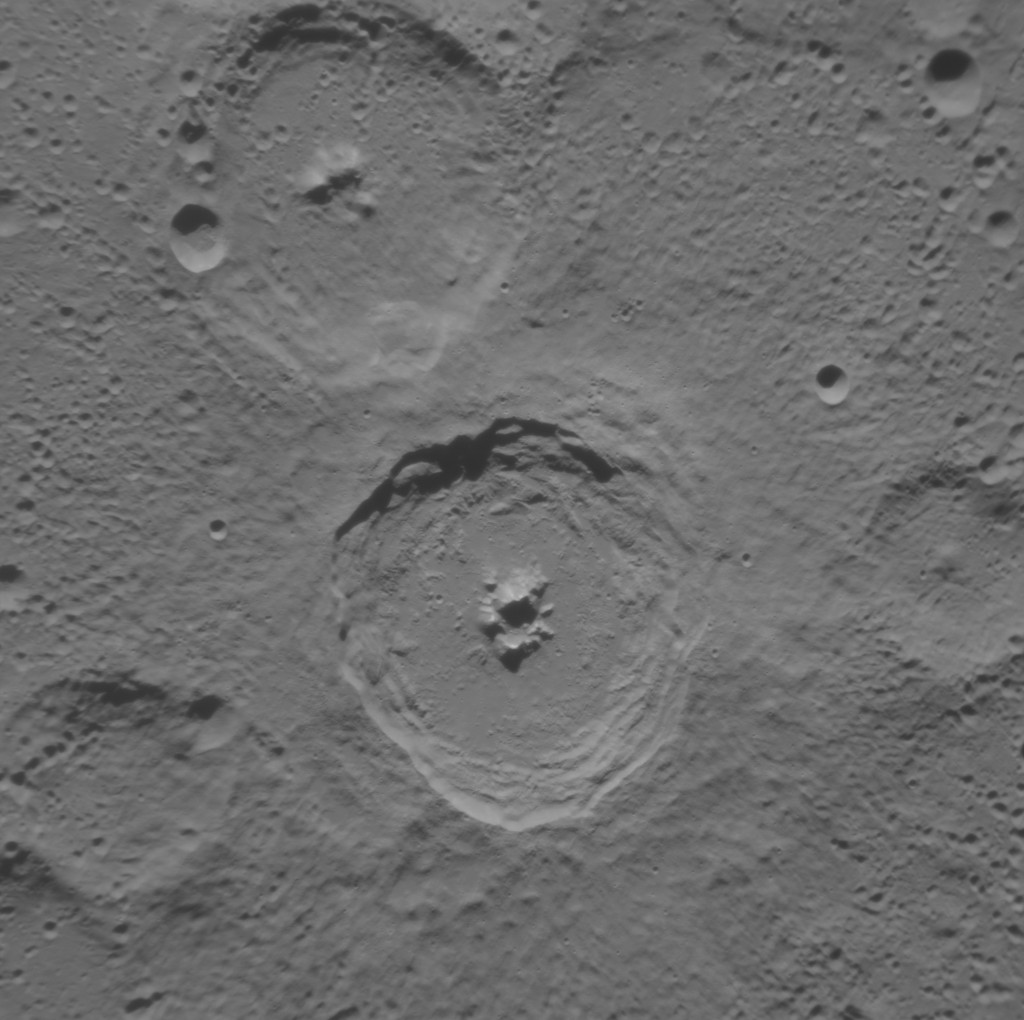
- MESSENGER NAC image. Holberg is at top, and Spitteler is below center.
- Feature type: Impact crater
- Location: Bach quadrangle, Mercury
- Coordinates: 67.37°S 59.57°W
- Diameter: 64 km
- Eponym: Ludvig Holberg

Holberg is a crater on Mercury. Its name was adopted by the International Astronomical Union in 1976. Holberg is named for the Dano-Norwegian writer Ludvig Holberg, who lived from 1684 to 1754.

Spitteler crater is due south of Holberg.
