= Spitteler (crater) =

Crater on Mercury

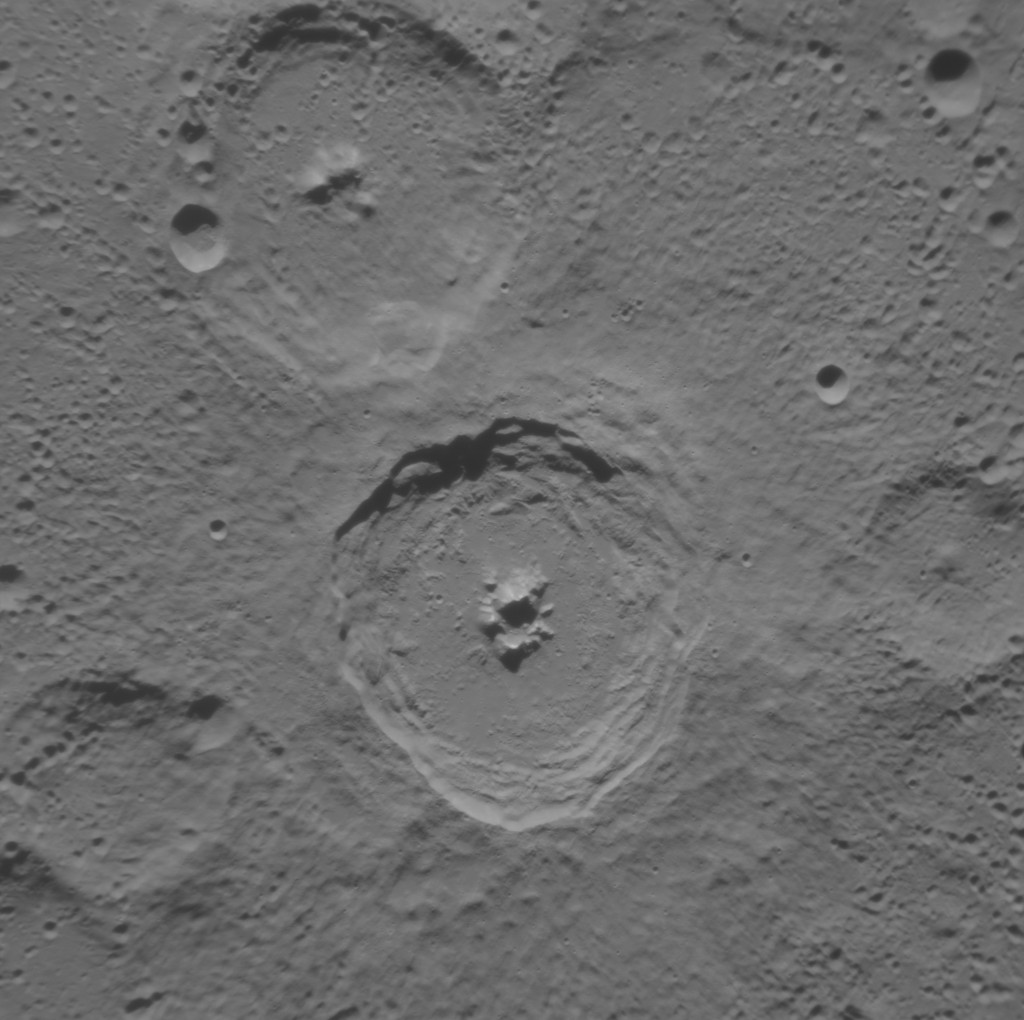
- MESSENGER NAC image. Spitteler is below center and Holberg is at top.
- Planet: Mercury
- Coordinates: 69.18°S 60.26°W
- Quadrangle: Bach
- Diameter: 67 km
- Eponym: Carl Spitteler

Spitteler is a crater on Mercury. Its name was adopted by the International Astronomical Union (IAU) in 1976. It is named for the Swiss epic poet Carl Spitteler.

Spitteler is one of the largest craters of the Kuiperian system on Mercury. The largest is Bartók crater.

To the southwest of Spitteler is the crater Camões, and to the north is Holberg. To the east is Horace.
