= Mark Davis (journalist) =

Australian investigative journalist

- Occupation: Investigative journalist on Dateline at SBS TV

Mark Davis is an Australian investigative journalist and lawyer, best known for his work on Dateline for SBS TV, where he is currently a co-presenter and video journalist.

Davis was educated at Warrandyte Primary School and then St Kevin's College in Melbourne.

== Career ==
=== ABC TV ===
Prior to commencing at SBS, Davis' background was as an investigative journalist with the ABC TV Foreign Correspondent and Four Corners programs.

Working on Foreign Correspondent in North Korea, Davis was awarded the 1998 Walkley Award for Excellence in Journalism for his report on North Korea Famine and in the same year was awarded the New York Festivals award for coverage of an ongoing news story, The Lion of the Panshi. Whilst at Four Corners, Davis won the 1998 Walkley Award for Best International Report with Peter McEvoy for The Survivor's Story and the 1999 Walkley Award for Best TV Current Affairs Report, called Blood on the Cross.

=== SBS TV ===
Davis first hosted Dateline from 2003 to 2004, succeeding Jana Wendt and preceding George Negus. Davis went on assignment and returned to the program in 2011 as a co-host with video journalist Yalda Hakim. Both Davis and Hakim take turns presenting the program in approximately six week blocks, while the other is away on assignment.

Whilst on assignment, in 2007 Davis was just metres away from the bombings that greeted Benazir Bhutto's return to Pakistan and was in the thick of the action during Madagascar's coup in 2009. He has also won acclaim for reporting on the trial of Australian Guantanamo Bay detainee David Hicks. His previous interviews have also included Malaysia's former Prime Minister Mahathir Mohamad and Pakistan's former President Pervez Musharraf.

During 2010, Davis gained unprecedented access to Australian WikiLeaks founder Julian Assange, secured the first interviews with two of the Bali Nine and gained worldwide attention via the Dateline website for his profile of Dutch anti-Islam MP Geert Wilders.

Davis was nominated for the Most Outstanding Public Affairs category at the 2011 Logies Awards for The Condemned, an intimate portrayal of Bali Nine members Andrew Chan and Myuran Sukumaran, partially filmed inside Indonesia's Kerobokan death-row prison.

Davis has won a Logie and five Walkley Awards, including the Gold Walkley in 2000 for a Dateline report on pro-Indonesian militias in East Timor, called Blood Money.
