= Ticky Fullerton =

Australian television presenter

- Born: Surrey, England
- Education: Magdalen College, University of Oxford
- Occupations: TV presenter Business journalist
- Years active: 1995–present
- Spouse: Michael Stutchbury

Ticky Fullerton is an English-born Australian journalist and TV presenter. Fullerton has hosted The Business on ABC News 24, Ticky on Sky News Business Channel and Your Money. She was previously a fill-in presenter of Lateline.

== Personal life ==
Fullerton grew up in Surrey, England, and has three siblings. She took a law degree at Magdalen College, University of Oxford, graduating in 1985. At Oxford she was a contemporary of British Prime Minister Boris Johnson.

After graduation she became an associate director with Credit Suisse First Boston, working in London. She then worked for Credit Suisse First Boston in Sydney, raising capital for businesses and government. She currently lives in Sydney with one son.

In July 2018, Fullerton married Michael Stutchbury in the UK.

== Career ==
Moving to the ABC in 1995, Fullerton worked in business journalism and for the TV show Lateline. She then became the presenter of Landline, a TV show dealing with farming issues in Australia. Following that, she moved into investigative reporting for Four Corners for five years, and later presented Lateline Business (which became The Business) until 2 December 2016, when Elysse Morgan replaced her.

"Lords of the Forest", a 2004 episode of Four Corners presented by Fullerton, was criticised for bias in favour of logging protesters. The Australian Communications and Media Authority upheld some of the complaints.

In February 2017, Sky News Australia announced that Fullerton would host Ticky, a new business programme on Sky News Business Channel.

After writing columns for The Australian for two years, she was appointed in January 2021 as their business editor-at-large.

In January 2023, it was announced that Fullerton had been appointed the chief executive of the Australian British Chamber of Commerce, effective 1 March 2023.

== Awards ==
Fullerton was awarded the Australian Government Peter Hunt Eureka Prize for Environmental Journalism (2004) for "3 provoking reports on issues of national significance – the fate of Tasmania's forests, the hidden agendas driving waste recycling and the fight for precious water resources".

== Publications ==
- Fullerton, T. 2001. Watershed: Deciding Our Water Future. Harper Collins/ABC Books, Sydney. ISBN 9780733309991.

Media offices
Preceded by Ali Moore	The Business; Presenter; 2010	Succeeded by Elysse Morgan
