= Emma Alberici =

Australian journalist

- Born: 3 February 1970 (age 56); Melbourne, Victoria, Australia
- Education: Our Lady of Mercy College; Deakin University; University of Melbourne
- Occupation: Journalist
- Years active: 1987−present
- Known for: Lateline
- Children: 3

Emma Alberici (born 3 February 1970) is an Australian journalist and former foreign correspondent who was the chief economics correspondent for the Australian Broadcasting Corporation's television network.

Alberici was until 2017 the presenter of ABC TV's flagship current affairs program, Lateline. She has been a foreign correspondent for the ABC. She previously worked as a reporter for the ABC's The 7.30 Report and Lateline, and was also a reporter and producer with A Current Affair on Australia's Nine Network.

== Early life and education ==
Emma Alberici was born to Franco and Anna Alberici. Her parents are Italian immigrants who arrived in Australia by passenger liner in 1955. The family settled in Melbourne, where Alberici attended Our Lady of Mercy College in Heidelberg, Victoria.

Alberici graduated with a bachelor's degree in journalism and economics from Deakin University and a bachelor's degree in Italian from the University of Melbourne.

== Career ==
Alberici's journalistic career began as cadet with the Melbourne newspaper Herald Sun. She was a reporter on The Small Business Show at the Nine Network.

Alberici has three times been a finalist in the Walkley Awards for journalism. All three were for investigative reports, the first being her report on the death of a patron at Star City Casino in 1998. It was Alberici's reports surrounding that event, including exclusive interviews with witnesses, family and friends, that prompted a police integrity commission inquiry. She was part of a team at Lateline that in 2012 helped inspire the Royal Commission into Institutional Responses to Child Sexual Abuse.

She authored three editions of The Small Business Book.

=== Lateline ===
Alberici began hosting the ABC's flagship current affairs program Lateline in 2012, when she replaced Ali Moore. She co-hosted alongside Tony Jones. The program was labelled as being, "an unmissable current affairs program that almost certainly creates more headlines in the next day's newspapers than any other TV show in the country." Following criticism of her interview style, she said accusations of bias were "nonsense", and that "People are far quicker to attack a woman in public than they would a man."

In October 2017, ABC announced that after 28 years Lateline would be cut as the broadcaster launches new investigative and specialist journalism teams.

Alberici then became the ABC's chief economics correspondent.

=== Controversy and redundancy ===
On 14 February 2018, Alberici wrote a news story for the ABC website stating evidence that only one in five large companies pays Australian tax, and an analysis piece critical of the (then Liberal) government's proposed company tax cuts. Later that day in parliament, Prime Minister at the time, Malcolm Turnbull, referred to the news story as "one of the most confused and poorly researched articles I've seen on this topic"

The ABC later took down both the news story and analysis, claiming they did not meet editorial standards. Alberici brought in a lawyer to negotiate with ABC management, and both pieces were edited and republished about a week later.

Other media outlets speculated that Malcolm Turnbull had put pressure on the ABC to withdraw the story, and claimed the ABC was being unfairly targeted by the government since other economic commentators had also questioned the merits of company tax cuts. A letter from Alberici's lawyer to the ABC Managing Director was later leaked to other media outlets. It claimed the head of ABC news had told Emma "that she is the cause of the ‘prime minister ringing him’ with complaints".

In April 2018, in response to the Australian Senate, the ABC claimed it had found a number of errors or misleading statements in Alberici's story, and that her analysis piece lacked impartiality.

Former ABC journalists have accused the ABC of "buckling to government pressure".

Following this episode, Alberici did not write much more on economics, and instead made several TV programs for the ABC's Foreign Correspondent.

She was made redundant by the ABC in 2020. After taking a complaint to the Fair Work Ombudsman, she reached a settlement with the ABC.

=== Post-ABC career ===
After leaving the ABC in 2020, Alberici took on the role of chief strategy, government relations and communications officer for financial comparison website Compare the Market. She left Compare the Market in April 2021. In 2021 she wrote a memoir titled Rewrite the Story for Hardie Grant Books.

== Personal life ==
Alberici was married to Jason McCauley, a sound recordist on 60 Minutes. They separated in 2017.

She has three children and resides in Sydney. Alberici has also lived in London, England, where she was based as the ABC's Europe correspondent.

Media offices
Preceded by Ali Moore	Lateline; Presenter (Monday, Tuesday & Friday); 2012–2017	Succeeded by Discontinued
