= Helen Vatsikopoulos =

Australian journalist, academic and documentary film-maker

- Born: 1 January 1960 (age 66); Florina, Greece
- Education: University of Technology Sydney
- Occupations: Journalist, academic, documentary film-maker
- Employer(s): Special Broadcasting Service, Australian Broadcasting Corporation
- Television: Dateline, Foreign Correspondent, Lateline, Asia Pacific Focus

Helen Vatsikopoulos (born 1 January 1960) is an Australian journalist, academic and documentary film–maker.

== Life ==
Helen Vatsikopoulos was born in Florina and early in her life lived in Laimos, a village in Western Macedonia, Greece. One of her grandmothers was a Slavophone Macedonian, her father identified as a Greek and some members of her family as Macedonian. She and her parents immigrated to Australia in 1965 and lived in Adelaide, South Australia. Vatsikopoulos was raised in a working class family and they were involved in the local Greek community. In her youth, she had a patriotic Greek upbringing and on weekends attended Greek language school. Vatsikopoulos considered herself Greek Macedonian during the Macedonia naming dispute.

For 27 years, Vatsikopoulos was a journalist and served as an international reporter early on in her career. As a reporter, she worked for the Special Broadcasting Service (SBS) and also hosted their Dateline current affairs program. At the Australian Broadcasting Corporation (ABC) she was a reporter for the Foreign Correspondent program, a reporter and producer for Lateline and was host on the Asia Pacific Focus program and the Australia Network.

Later in life, Vatsikopoulos researched her family history and for her doctorate, the topics of migration, complex ethno–linguistic identities and the Greek Civil War. In September 2011, Vatsikopoulos joined the University of Technology, Sydney and is a lecturer in Journalism and holds a Doctorate in Creative Arts (2019).

== Awards ==
In 1992, Vatsikopoulos won a Walkley Award for All Media/Best International Report for her body of work on the dissolution of the Soviet Union, for SBS's Dateline.
