= Leigh Sales =

Australian journalist and author (born 1973)

Leigh Sales AM
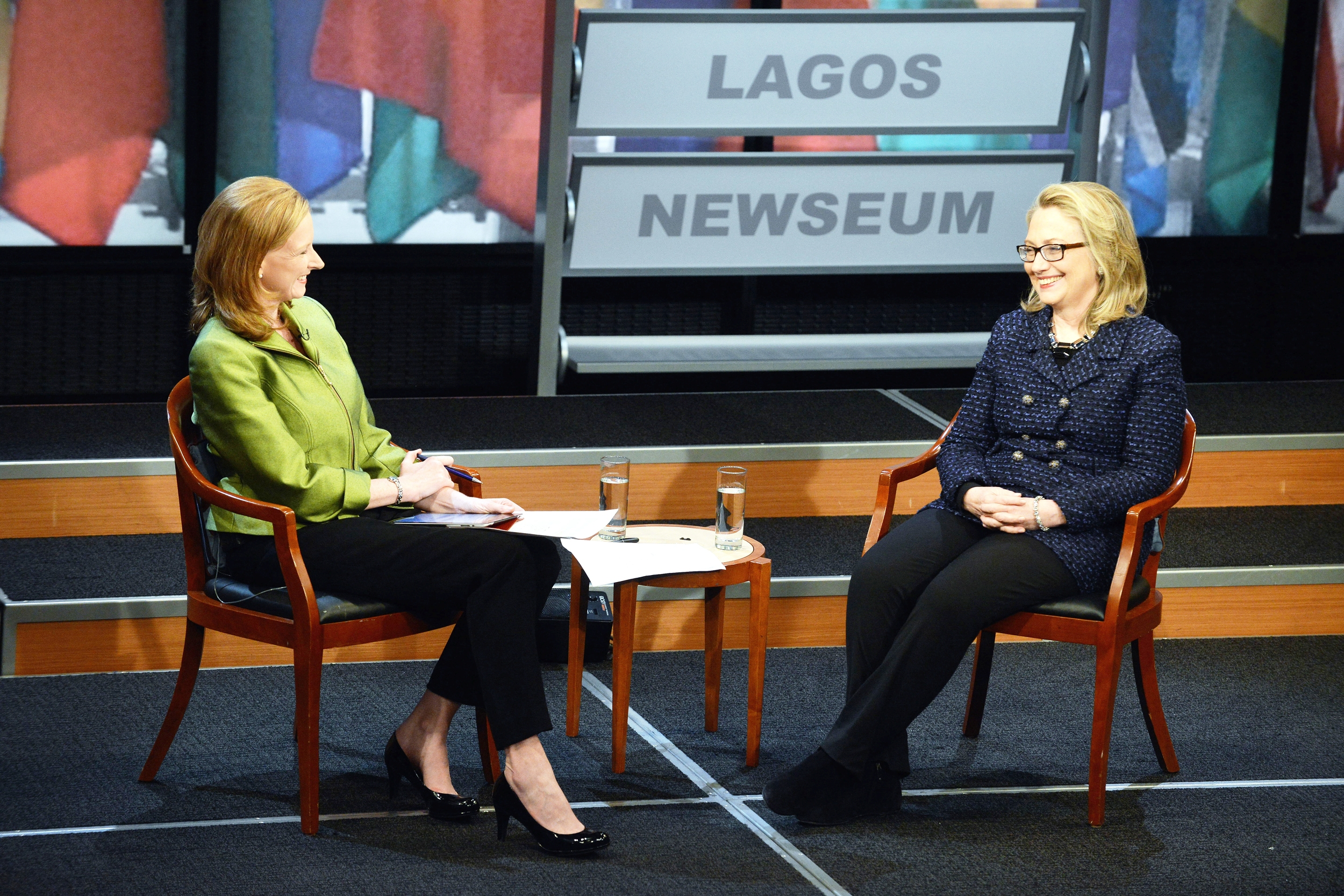
- Sales (left) hosting a Global Town Hall with Hillary Clinton in January 2013
- Born: 10 May 1973 (age 53); Brisbane, Queensland, Australia
- Education: Aspley State High School
- Alma mater: Queensland University of Technology; Deakin University
- Occupations: Journalist, author
- Years active: 1995–present
- Employer: Australian Broadcasting Corporation
- Spouse: Phil Willis (m. 1996; sep. 2016)
- Children: 2

Leigh Peta Sales AM (born 10 May 1973) is an Australian journalist and author, best known for her work with the Australian Broadcasting Corporation (ABC). She has won three Walkley Awards, and in 2023 was nominated for the Gold Logie Award for Most Popular Personality on Australian Television.

Sales hosted ABC TV's current affairs program 7.30 from 2011 to 2022. In November 2022, it was announced that Sales had been appointed as the new host of ABC TV's weekly documentary series Australian Story. She has also written and co-written several books, and since 2014 has co-hosted a podcast with Annabel Crabb, called Chat 10 Looks 3.

== Early life and education ==
Leigh Peta Sales was born on 10 May 1973 in Brisbane and attended Aspley State High School in that city.

She received a bachelor of business, with a major in journalism, from the Queensland University of Technology, graduating in 1994, and Master of International Relations from Deakin University.

== Career ==
=== Broadcasting ===
Sales first worked for Nine Network.

She joined the ABC in Brisbane in 1995. Since then, Sales has held several prominent roles with the ABC and was New South Wales political reporter covering the 1999 and 2007 state elections. In addition, she reported on the 2000 Summer Olympics.

Sales was the network's Washington correspondent from 2001 to 2005. The stories which she covered included the Iraq War, the 2004 U.S. presidential election, Guantanamo Bay, and Hurricane Katrina.

She was the ABC's national security correspondent from 2006 until 2008 and was based in Sydney. From 2008 to 2010, Sales was a co-host of the ABC's Lateline, a late-night national current affairs show with a heavy emphasis on federal politics and international affairs.

Sales also hosted the ABC's Australia Votes for the 2016 Australian Election and again for the 2019 election and hosted her last in 2022.

In December 2010, Sales was appointed anchor of the ABC's current affairs program, 7.30. She has interviewed every living Australian prime minister and many world leaders and celebrities, including Hillary Clinton, the Dalai Lama, Aung San Suu Kyi, Paul McCartney, Patti Smith, and Salman Rushdie.

In February 2022, Sales announced she would step down from 7:30 in June 2022 following the federal election. She said she planned to continue working for the ABC. In November 2022 Sales was announced as the new host of ABC TV's weekly biographical documentary series Australian Story, commencing in early 2023.

In May 2024, Sales was announced as a mentor of autistic journalism students at Macquarie University for ABC TV's new interview documentary series The Assembly, based on a French format, which premiered on 20 August 2024.

In January 2026, Sales joined ABC Classic to host a new Saturday Afternoon program during the network's 50th‑anniversary months.

=== Publishing ===
Her first book, Detainee 002: The Case of David Hicks, was published in 2007 by Melbourne University Publishing (MUP). The book covers Hicks' case as well as a detailed explanation of the Bush administration's detainee policy in the war on terror and the Australian Government's cooperation.

Sales' second book, On Doubt, was published in 2009 as part of MUP's series Little Books on Big Themes. It covers the rise of opinion in place of straight news reporting and the value of bringing a sceptical mindset to politics and policy, instead of ideological certainty. A second edition was published in 2017, with an additional chapter noting the Trump presidency and the rise of fake news.

Her third book, Any Ordinary Day, was published in October 2018. It examines the way people adapt to life-changing blindsides, drawing on Sales' personal experience as well as her years covering high-profile news events that drastically changed people's lives.

Sales' writing has also regularly appeared in major Australian publications, including The Monthly, The Australian, The Sydney Morning Herald, The Age, and, before its demise, The Bulletin.

In the wake of fellow ABC presenters Hamish Macdonald and Lisa Millar both deactivating their Twitter accounts due to the high level of personal abuse they received on the platform, Sales wrote an opinion piece for the ABC in September 2021 exploring the issue of bullying received by journalists on Twitter which she described as "insidious" and "unhinged". This in turn prompted a public conversation on the topic.

=== Podcast ===
In November 2014, Sales started a podcast with Annabel Crabb called Chat 10 Looks 3. It is independent of the work they do for other media outlets and is an opportunity for them to talk about books, movies, television, the media and culture.

The podcast won two awards at the 2019 Australian Podcast Awards in the "Literature, Arts & Music" and "TV, Film & Pop Culture" categories. Described by Sales and Crabb as "shambolic" and "peripatetic", the podcast episodes are recorded every two to three weeks. The podcast has spawned livestream shows in Australian capital cities and a book titled Well Hello published in September 2021. Self-proclaimed "chatters or chatterati" have formed a Chat 10 Looks 3 community on social media platforms built around the same tenets as the podcast – friendship, kindness, and an agreement to not discuss politics. Sales has said "a community has sprung up around (the podcast) who shares these in-jokes and language and interests. When I consume podcasts... I tend to see myself as a member of the audience, not as a member of a community. That's why it caught me by surprise".

== Other activities ==
Sales has presented sessions at the Sydney Writers' Festival, Melbourne Writers Festival, and Adelaide Writers' Week.

In 2020, Sales voiced Coco's mother, Bella, in season two of Bluey, including the episode "Baby Race". and in 2022 she voiced an ice-cream lady in the "Ice Cream" episode.

In September 2023, she appeared at a public event at ANU, as part of the university's Meet the Authors series. She talked to astrophysicist and ANU vice-chancellor Brian Schmidt about her new book Storytellers. Questions, Answers and the Craft of Journalism.

== Awards and recognition ==
Sales won the Walkley Award for Best Radio Current Affairs Reporting in 2005. For Detainee 002: The Case of David Hicks, she won the George Munster Award for Independent Journalism in 2007, and the book was nominated for the Victorian Premier's Prize for Nonfiction in 2008. In 2012 Sales won the Walkley Award for Broadcasting and Online Interviewing.

In 2019, Sales was appointed a Member of the Order of Australia for her services to broadcast journalism.

In September 2022, Sales was awarded an honorary doctorate by QUT "for her distinguished service to the community".

In 2023, she was awarded an honorary doctorate from Edith Cowan University, for her "service to journalism and the community".

Award	Work	Year	Result
Gold Logie Award for Most Popular Personality on Australian Television	The 7.30 Report	2023	Nominated
Walkley Book Award	Any Ordinary Day	2019	Won
Member of the Order of Australia (AM)	For service to the broadcast media	2019	Honoured
Walkley Award for Broadcasting and Online Interviewing	Interview	2012	Won
George Munster Award for Independent Journalism	Detainee 002: The Case of David Hicks (2007)	2007	Won
Walkley Award for Best Radio Current Affairs reporting	For report on Guantanamo Bay	2005	Won

== Personal life ==
Sales was married to Phil Willis and they have two sons. After 20 years of marriage, Sales and Willis separated in December 2016.

== Bibliography ==
- Detainee 002 : The Case of David Hicks. Melbourne University Publishing. 2007. ISBN 9780522854008.
- On Doubt. Melbourne University Publishing. 2009. ISBN 9780522856040.
- "Born again". The Monthly. Vol. 44. April 2009. pp. 19–20.
- Any Ordinary Day: Blindsides, resilience and what happens after the worst day of your life. Penguin Australia. 2018. ISBN 9781760144173.
- Crabb, Annabel; Sales, Leigh (2021). Well Hello : Meanderings from the World of Chat 10 Looks 3. Miranda Murphy. Australia: Random House. ISBN 978-1-76104-152-5. OCLC 1253457234.
- Storytellers – Questions, Answers and the Craft of Journalism. Simon & Schuster. 2023. ISBN 9781761106972.

Media offices
Preceded by Virginia Trioli	Lateline; Presenter (Monday, Tuesday & Friday); 2008–2010	Succeeded by Ali Moore
Preceded by Presenter with Chris Uhlmann	7.30; Presenter; 2011–2022	Succeeded by Sarah Ferguson
