= Pre-election pendulum for the 2007 Australian federal election =

The Mackerras federal election pendulum, 2007 (by Malcolm Mackerras) shows the state of the major political parties prior to the 2007 Australian federal election. The table shows seats in the Australian House of Representatives arranged in the form of a Mackerras pendulum based on their 2004 federal election two-party preferred result. Some seats in New South Wales and Queensland underwent a redistribution in 2006, their margins have been recalculated due to this.

MPs shown in italics did not contest the 2007 election. Gwydir, held by John Anderson for the Nationals, was abolished in the last redistribution and is not shown. Notionally government-held seats are shown on the left, with other seats shown on the right.

== Very safe seats ==
Seat	MP	Party	Margin	Seat	MP	Party	Margin
Mallee, Vic	John Forrest	National	24.8%
Murray, Vic	Sharman Stone	Liberal	24.1%
Maranoa, Qld	Bruce Scott	National	21.0%
Mitchell, NSW	Alan Cadman	Liberal	20.7%	Grayndler, NSW	Anthony Albanese	Labor	21.3%
Riverina, NSW	Kay Hull	National	20.7%	Batman, Vic	Martin Ferguson	Labor	21.3%
O'Connor, WA	Wilson Tuckey	Liberal	20.4%	Melbourne, Vic	Lindsay Tanner	Labor	21.1%

== Safe seats ==
Seat	MP	Party	Margin	Seat	MP	Party	Margin
Barker, SA	Patrick Secker	Liberal	19.9%
Moncrieff, Qld	Steven Ciobo	Liberal	19.9%
Groom, Qld	Ian Macfarlane	Liberal	19.0%
Parkes, NSW	John Cobb	National	18.8%
Bradfield, NSW	Brendan Nelson	Liberal	17.5%
Indi, Vic	Sophie Mirabella	Liberal	16.3%
Mackellar, NSW	Bronwyn Bishop	Liberal	15.5%
Farrer, NSW	Sussan Ley	Liberal	15.4%
Fadden, Qld	David Jull	Liberal	15.3%
Curtin, WA	Julie Bishop	Liberal	14.6%
Lyne, NSW	Mark Vaile	National	14.1%
McPherson, Qld	Margaret May	Liberal	14.0%
Grey, SA	Barry Wakelin	Liberal	13.8%
Cook, NSW	Bruce Baird	Liberal	13.7%
Mayo, SA	Alexander Downer	Liberal	13.6%
Fairfax, Qld	Alex Somlyay	Liberal	13.3%
Aston, Vic	Chris Pearce	Liberal	13.2%
Fisher, Qld	Peter Slipper	Liberal	13.0%
Forde, Qld	Kay Elson	Liberal	13.0%
Hume, NSW	Alby Schultz	Liberal	12.9%
Pearce, WA	Judi Moylan	Liberal	12.9%
Wannon, Vic	David Hawker	Liberal	12.4%	Sydney NSW	Tanya Plibersek	Labor	17.3%
Wide Bay, Qld	Warren Truss	National	12.2%	Wills, Vic	Kelvin Thomson	Labor	16.9%
Berowra, NSW	Philip Ruddock	Liberal	12.2%	Blaxland, NSW	Michael Hatton	Labor	15.3%
Tangney, WA	Dennis Jensen	Liberal	11.8%	Gellibrand, Vic	Nicola Roxon	Labor	15.0%
Casey, Vic	Tony Smith	Liberal	11.4%	Gorton, Vic	Brendan O'Connor	Labor	14.9%
Warringah, NSW	Tony Abbott	Liberal	11.3%	Scullin, Vic	Harry Jenkins	Labor	14.8%
Flinders, Vic	Greg Hunt	Liberal	11.1%	Watson, NSW	Tony Burke	Labor	14.6%
Macarthur, NSW	Pat Farmer	Liberal	11.1%	New England, NSW	Tony Windsor	Independent	14.2%
Greenway, NSW	Louise Markus	Liberal	11.0%	Throsby, NSW	Jennie George	Labor	13.9%
Moore, WA	Mal Washer	Liberal	10.8%	Fowler, NSW	Julia Irwin	Labor	13.5%
Menzies, Vic	Kevin Andrews	Liberal	10.7%	Fraser, ACT	Bob McMullan	Labor	13.3%
Forrest, WA	Geoff Prosser	Liberal	10.5%	Denison, Tas	Duncan Kerr	Labor	13.3%
Kennedy, Qld	Bob Katter	Independent	10.5%	Port Adelaide, SA	Rod Sawford	Labor	12.9%
Ryan, Qld	Michael Johnson	Liberal	10.4%	Chifley, NSW	Roger Price	Labor	12.1%
Leichhardt, Qld	Warren Entsch	Liberal	10.3%	Reid, NSW	Laurie Ferguson	Labor	12.0%
Dawson, Qld	De-Anne Kelly	National	10.2%	Cunningham, NSW	Sharon Bird	Labor	11.7%
North Sydney, NSW	Joe Hockey	Liberal	10.0%	Hunter, NSW	Joel Fitzgibbon	Labor	11.2%

== Fairly safe seats ==
Seat	MP	Party	Margin	Seat	MP	Party	Margin
Goldstein, Vic	Andrew Robb	Liberal	10.0%
Kooyong, Vic	Petro Georgiou	Liberal	9.8%
Gilmore, NSW	Joanna Gash	Liberal	9.5%	Canberra, ACT	Annette Ellis	Labor	9.6%
Canning, WA	Don Randall	Liberal	9.5%	Maribyrnong, Vic	Bob Sercombe	Labor	9.5%
Dunkley, Vic	Bruce Billson	Liberal	9.4%	Shortland, NSW	Jill Hall	Labor	9.3%
Dickson, Qld	Peter Dutton	Liberal	9.1%	Lalor, Vic	Julia Gillard	Labor	8.8%
Bowman, Qld	Andrew Laming	Liberal	8.9%	Newcastle, NSW	Sharon Grierson	Labor	8.7%
Hughes, NSW	Danna Vale	Liberal	8.8%	Kingsford Smith, NSW	Peter Garrett	Labor	8.6%
Hinkler, Qld	Paul Neville	National	8.8%	Griffith, Qld	Kevin Rudd	Labor	8.5%
Higgins, Vic	Peter Costello	Liberal	8.8%	Charlton, NSW	Kelly Hoare	Labor	8.4%
Petrie, Qld	Teresa Gambaro	Liberal	7.9%	Calwell, Vic	Maria Vamvakinou	Labor	8.2%
Flynn, Qld	new seat	National	7.9%	Calare, NSW	Peter Andren	Independent	7.9%
Gippsland, Vic	Peter McGauran	National	7.7%	Fremantle, WA	Carmen Lawrence	Labor	7.8%
Robertson, NSW	Jim Lloyd	Liberal	6.9%	Lingiari, NT	Warren Snowdon	Labor	7.7%
Paterson, NSW	Bob Baldwin	Liberal	6.8%	Franklin, Tas	Harry Quick	Labor	7.6%
Sturt, SA	Christopher Pyne	Liberal	6.8%	Barton, NSW	Robert McClelland	Labor	7.6%
Longman, Qld	Mal Brough	Liberal	6.6%	Hotham, Vic	Simon Crean	Labor	7.4%
Cowper, NSW	Luke Hartsuyker	National	6.6%	Oxley, QLD	Bernie Ripoll	Labor	7.2%
McEwen, Vic	Fran Bailey	Liberal	6.4%	Werriwa, NSW	Chris Hayes	Labor	7.1%
Kalgoorlie, WA	Barry Haase	Liberal	6.3%	Prospect, NSW	Chris Bowen	Labor	6.9%
Herbert, Qld	Peter Lindsay	Liberal	6.1%	Perth, WA	Stephen Smith	Labor	6.7%

== Marginal seats ==
Seat	MP	Party	Margin	Seat	MP	Party	Margin
La Trobe, Vic	Jason Wood	Liberal	5.8%	Corio, Vic	Gavan O'Connor	Labor	5.6%
Blair, Qld	Cameron Thompson	Liberal	5.7%	Lilley, Qld	Wayne Swan	Labor	5.4%
Page, NSW	Ian Causley	National	5.5%	Brand, WA	Kim Beazley	Labor	4.7%
Boothby, SA	Andrew Southcott	Liberal	5.4%	Jagajaga, Vic	Jenny Macklin	Labor	4.4%
Corangamite, Vic	Stewart McArthur	Liberal	5.3%	Brisbane, Qld	Arch Bevis	Labor	4.0%
McMillan, Vic	Russell Broadbent	Liberal	5.0%	Capricornia, Qld	Kirsten Livermore	Labor	3.8%
Deakin, Vic	Phil Barresi	Liberal	5.0%	Melbourne Ports, Vic	Michael Danby	Labor	3.7%
Dobell, NSW	Ken Ticehurst	Liberal	4.8%	Lyons, Tas	Dick Adams	Labor	3.7%
Bennelong, NSW	John Howard	Liberal	4.0%	Bruce, Vic	Alan Griffin	Labor	3.5%
Eden-Monaro, NSW	Gary Nairn	Liberal	3.3%	Banks, NSW	Daryl Melham	Labor	3.3%
Lindsay, NSW	Jackie Kelly	Liberal	2.9%	Rankin, Qld	Craig Emerson	Labor	3.0%
Moreton, Qld	Gary Hardgrave	Liberal	2.8%	Lowe, NSW	John Murphy	Labor	3.1%
Solomon, NT	Dave Tollner	CLP	2.8%	Chisholm, Vic	Anna Burke	Labor	2.7%
Bass, Tas	Michael Ferguson	Liberal	2.6%	Ballarat, Vic	Catherine King	Labor	2.2%
Wentworth, NSW	Malcolm Turnbull	Liberal	2.6%	Holt, Vic	Anthony Byrne	Labor	1.5%
Stirling, WA	Michael Keenan	Liberal	2.0%	Isaacs, Vic	Ann Corcoran	Labor	1.5%
Hasluck, WA	Stuart Henry	Liberal	1.8%	Richmond, NSW	Justine Elliot	Labor	1.5%
Parramatta, NSW	Julie Owens	Labor	-1.1%	Adelaide, SA	Kate Ellis	Labor	1.3%
Braddon, Tas	Mark Baker	Liberal	1.1%	Bendigo, Vic	Steve Gibbons	Labor	1.0%
Makin, SA	Trish Draper	Liberal	0.9%	Cowan, WA	Graham Edwards	Labor	0.8%
Wakefield, SA	David Fawcett	Liberal	0.7%	Macquarie, NSW	Kerry Bartlett	Liberal	-0.5%
Bonner, Qld	Ross Vasta	Liberal	0.6%	Swan, WA	Kim Wilkie	Labor	0.1%
Kingston, SA	Kym Richardson	Liberal	0.1%	Hindmarsh, SA	Steve Georganas	Labor	0.1%
