= Puccini (crater) =

Crater on Mercury

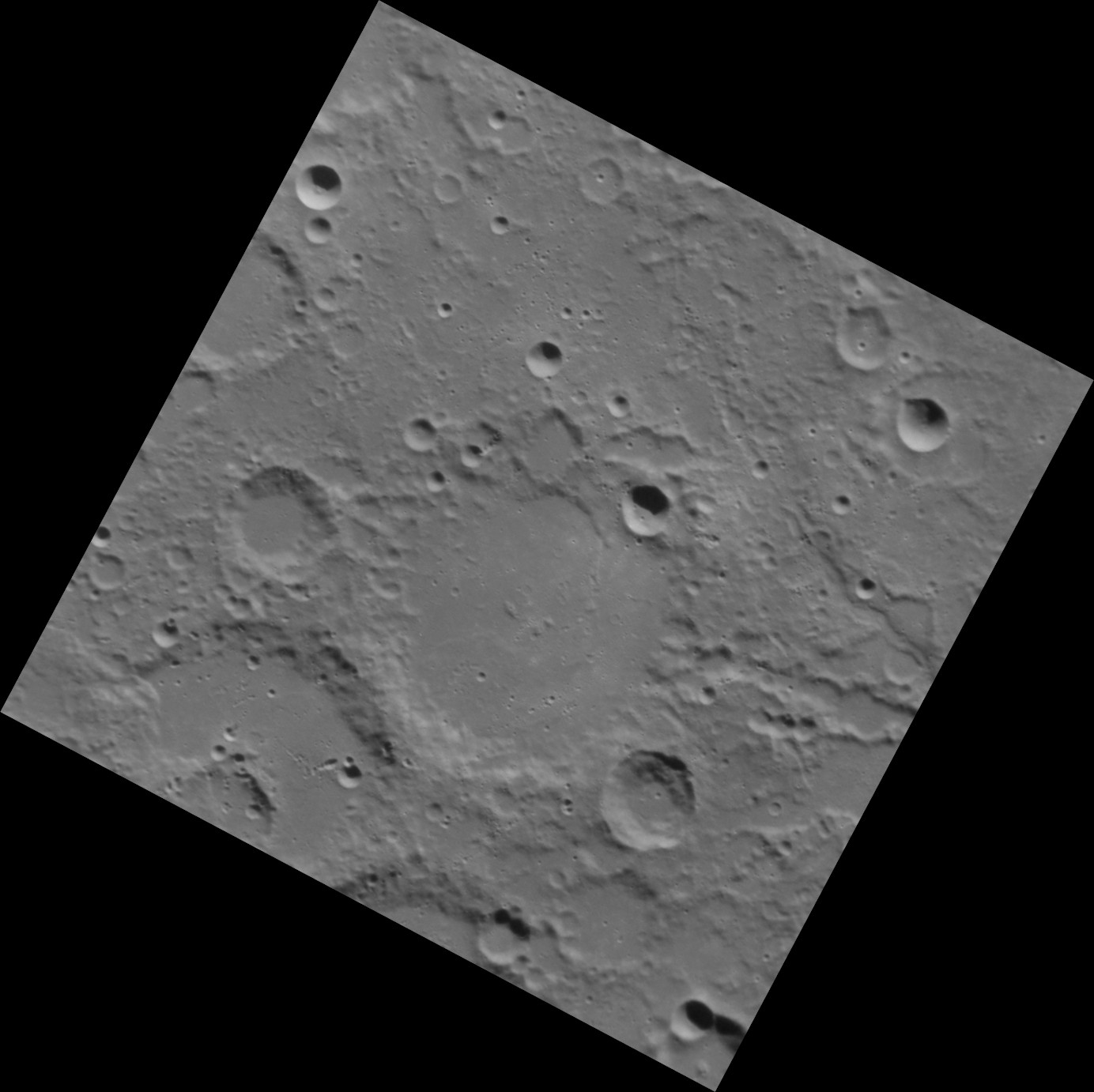
- MESSENGER NAC image
- Planet: Mercury
- Coordinates: 65.39°S 45.32°W
- Quadrangle: Discovery
- Diameter: 76 km
- Eponym: Giacomo Puccini

Puccini is a crater on Mercury. Its name was adopted by the International Astronomical Union (IAU) in 1976. It is named for the Italian composer Giacomo Puccini.

To the south of Puccini is the crater Horace.
