= Augusto Alberici =

Italian painter

Augusto Alberici (born September 1846, in Trastavere, Rome) was an Italian painter and antiquarian.

He was born in Rome, but his father was a sea captain from Gaeta. His mother was Roman. He trained under Toglietti in Accademia di San Luca. he obtained the early sponsorship of two patrons, the engineer Giovanni Battista Marotti and Giovanni Frontini. He mainly painted battle vistas or landscapes. Among his works were:

- The Snow
- Anticoli
- The return from the Campaign
- The battle of Crescentino fought by Emanuele Filiberto
- Julius Caesar crosses the Rubicon
