= Local Radio Breakfast =

- Genre: News, Talkback, music, community information and more
- Running time: 105 min. weekdays; including news and weather with the latest
- Country of origin: Australia
- Home station: ABC Local Radio
- Hosted by: Various presenters
- Original release: since 1930s – present

Local Radio Breakfast is an early morning Australian radio program. The program is broadcast on the ABC Local Radio network and is simulcast to state-based metro and regional radio studios and newsroom. Featuring news, talk-back, social issues, information, music and entertainment; the program is broadcast live to audiences in Australia's eastern states and, due to a difference in time zones, on delay to audiences in westerns states.

== Background ==
Local Radio Breakfast programming includes live broadcasts of news, music and community service announcements. The program airs between 5:30 am and 8 am AEST, prior to the daily current affairs program, AM, at 8 am. A weekend edition of the program, Saturday Breakfast, is broadcast from 6 am to 7:45 am AEST.

== Format ==
The format of the Saturday Breakfast program, while not always the same, is usually consistent. The program begins at 6 am following the hourly news broadcast. ABC news broadcasts are state-based and occur every hour, on the hour, introduced by the "Majestic Fanfare" theme tune.

The weekday Local Radio Breakfast program involves a presenter highlighting key news stories, introducing a musical playlist and making community announcements. An average of four major current affairs news items are presented each hour, with precedence reserved earlier in the program for deeper analysis and discussion of key new stories. Key news items include a mix of reports from ABC correspondents, the BBC and CNN. Local Radio Breakfast also involves interviews with a variety of people, including federal and state politicians, prominent academic or social commentators, persons of interest, celebrities and people involved in current affairs or breaking news stories.

National Breakfast is a similar broadcast on metro and regional ABC radio stations, whose content is identical to the morning broadcast on ABC's 24-hour TV News channel. National Breakfast differs from Local Radio Breakfast in that the content of the program has a strictly national focus.

== AM ==
At 8 am, Local Radio Breakfast switches over to AM. AM is the ABC's flagship national radio current affairs program, and follows an identical format to similar long-running ABC current affairs programs, The World Today and PM. AM is presented by Sabra Lane, an award-winning ABC journalist. The AM program in presented on weekends between 8 am and 8:30 am, after which listeners are ‘returned’ to local hosts and state based radio programs.
