= The Business (TV program) =

Australian finance news TV program

- Presented by: Alicia Barry
- Country of origin: Australia
- Original language: English
- No. of seasons: 9

Production
- Running time: 22 minutes

Original release
- Network: ABC; ABC News
- Release: 14 August 2006 – present

The Business is an Australian business and financial news television program broadcast on ABC and ABC News.

The program is hosted by Alicia Barry. It is broadcast four nights a week Monday to Thursday at 8.45pm (AEST/AEDT) weekdays on ABC News and 10.30pm (AEST/AEDT) on ABC.

The program format involves a wrap up of the domestic market movements of the day, feature stories on business news events and usually at least one interview per night with leading business and political figures.

The programme also features overseas market news and analysis from major stock exchanges. It is broadcast from the ABC's Sydney studio in Ultimo.

== History ==
The program launched on 14 August 2006 as Lateline Business and was rebranded as The Business in January 2012. In May 2010, host Ali Moore left Lateline Business to host Afternoon Live on ABC News and was replaced by Ticky Fullerton.

In December 2016, Ticky Fullerton resigned from the ABC and Elysse Morgan replaced her.

In December 2022, Elysse Morgan resigned from the ABC after 15 years.

== See also ==
- List of Australian television series
