= Dateline (Australian TV program) =

Australian television series

- Also known as: Dateline World (1984–1985)
- Genre: Current affairs
- Country of origin: Australia
- Original language: English
- No. of seasons: 30

Production
- Running time: 30 minutes

Original release
- Network: SBS
- Release: 19 October 1984 – present

Related
- Insight

Dateline is an Australian international current affairs program broadcast on SBS Television on Tuesday evenings at 9:30pm. Since its debut as Dateline World at 8:00pm on Friday, 19 October 1984, it has focused largely on international political and social issues, often in developing countries and conflict zones.

In 2015, the program changed its format, changing from one-hour episodes featuring multiple stories, to half-hour single subject episodes. The series focuses on under-reported stories from around the globe, with a documentary-style format. It is broadcast on Tuesdays at 9:30pm following Insight, and all episodes are available to view on SBS On Demand. It is the longest-running international current affairs program in Australia.

== History ==
Dateline World premiered at 8:00 pm on Friday 19 October 1984, changing its name the following year to simply Dateline.

Since its inception, Dateline has focused largely on international events, often in developing or warring nations. It covered topics such as: global conflict, environmental policies, social justice, crime, women's rights, social change, and global politics. Dateline reporters have covered events including: the Iraq War, violence in East Timor (2006), the war in Afghanistan, global terror attacks, the rise of Islamic State, the European refugee crisis, the United States under Trump, Brexit, and pro-democracy protests in Hong Kong..

From 1984 until 2015, an hour-long program featuring multiple stories was anchored by a studio host. In 2015 a new format was introduced, changing to half-hour single-subject episodes., and the role of studio host was removed.

Dateline is the longest-running international current affairs program in Australia, celebrating its 40th year in 2024.

== Personnel ==
Early program hosts included Jana Wendt and Pria Viswalingam. Mark Davis, hosted Dateline between 2003 and 2004, earning several nominations for the Walkley Awards.George Negus took over from 2005 until 2010, being replaced by his predecessor Mark Davis along with Yalda Hakim, another Dateline journalist. Helen Vatsikopoulos also spent time as host. In December 2012, Yalda Hakim resigned from Dateline to join BBC World News and was replaced by former CNN presenter Anjali Rao in February 2013.

In 2015, under the new program format the role of studio host was removed. Since then, the half-hour episodes have been fronted by a team of reporters, as well as guest reporters from within SBS News and Current Affairs, such as Marc Fennell, Janice Petersen, Jan Fran, and Laura Murphy Oates.

Dateline's executive producers have included: Mike Carey (1999–2007), Peter Charley (2007–2014), and Bernadine Lim (2014–2018). Georgina Davies was promoted to executive producer from series producer in 2018.

== Broadcast and description ==
As of 2024 Dateline is a half-hour program broadcast on SBS Television on Tuesdays at 9.30pm, following Insight. All episodes are available to view on SBS On Demand. There are 15 seasons available online.The series runs for 32 episodes a year.

Dateline focuses on under-reported stories from around the globe, with a documentary style.

== Awards ==
The long-running current affairs program has accumulated many awards over its lifetime, including Walkley Awards, Logie Awards, and UNAA Media Peace Awards, New York Festival Awards, an Australian Screen Editors Guild Award, as well as nominations for the One World Media Awards, the Association of International Broadcasting Awards, and the Asian Academy Awards

== See also ==
- List of Australian television series
- List of programs broadcast by Special Broadcasting Service
- List of longest-running Australian television series
