= Michael Stutchbury =

Australian journalist

- Born: 4 May 1957 (age 69); Melbourne, Victoria, Australia
- Education: University of Adelaide
- Occupations: Newspaper editor, journalist
- Spouse: Ticky Fullerton

Michael Stutchbury (born 4 May 1957) is the Executive Director of the Centre for Independent Studies. He is an Australian newspaper editor and journalist who was previously the editor-in-chief of the Australian Financial Review and economics editor at The Australian. He generally writes from a free market viewpoint, and was critical of a number of the Rudd–Gillard government's economic policies, particularly on its stimulus packages, and industrial relations.

Born in Melbourne, Stutchbury began his journalistic career with the Australian Financial Review. Later, he became a business editor of The Australian, and a Washington correspondent during the first term of the Clinton Administration, before becoming one of the longest-serving editors of The Australian.

He is the father of 2018 NSW Young Liberals President, Harry Stutchbury. In July 2018, Michael Stutchbury married Ticky Fullerton in the UK.

He occasionally appears on Insiders, the ABC's weekly program on political discussion.

Stutchbury stepped down from his role as editor-in-chief of the Australian Financial Review in August 2024, but returned in a writing role at the publication as editor-at-large in 2025 before becoming Executive Director at the Centre for Independent Studies.

== Centre for Independent Studies and Tom Switzer resignation ==
In June 2025, Stutchbury was appointed executive director of the Centre for Independent Studies, succeeding Tom Switzer, who remained with the organisation as a senior fellow.

In September 2025, during Stutchbury's early period as executive director, the Centre for Independent Studies faced media scrutiny over its handling of a Fair Work Commission dispute involving former employee Emilie Dye and former executive director Tom Switzer, who denied the allegations.

Stutchbury initially resisted calls to dismiss Switzer, saying CIS would await the outcome of the Fair Work Commission process before taking further action.

Following further media scrutiny and criticism of CIS's handling of the matter, Switzer resigned from his role as a senior fellow effective immediately.

In an email to staff reported by The Sydney Morning Herald, Stutchbury described the matter as "a challenging workplace dispute in the Fair Work Commission" and said that "the pressure of this process has affected both the CIS and Tom personally".

Stutchbury also told staff: "After careful consideration, Tom has decided it is in the best interests of CIS that he resign effective immediately."

On 5 September 2025, CIS and Dye issued a joint statement confirming that the Fair Work Commission proceedings had been resolved, with CIS saying that the events had caused Dye "significant distress" and that it "once again apologise[d] to Emilie".
