= Tales from the Political Trenches =

Book by Maxine McKew

- Author: Maxine McKew
- Genre: Memoir
- Publication date: 2012

Tales from the Political Trenches is a 2012 Australian political memoir by journalist and former Australian Labor Party politician Maxine McKew. McKew's account of her life in politics is highly critical of the leadership decisions made inside the Federal ALP.

McKew was elected to the Australian House of Representatives at the 2007 general election, defeating then-Liberal Prime Minister John Howard in his own seat of Bennelong. McKew was "part of the Kevin ’07 juggernaut, which dismissed the Howard Government after eleven years of power. She believed in the ideas and aspirations of the Labor Party leader, Kevin Rudd. But then his own party brought him, as a first term Prime Minister, down."

== Criticism of internal ALP politics ==
McKew describes life in Federal parliament as being "'intoxicating, joyous and humbling but also brutish, backstabbing marked by betrayals and dishonesty.'" She writes that the ALP is internally controlled by factional nobodies. In the book, former Labor Prime Minister Paul Keating lambasts the "factional Tintookies" in the federal Labor caucus, saying "we have them to thank for the fact that Rudd blinked on the CPRS (Carbon Pollution Reduction Scheme)".

McKew also opines that the Labor Party has wasted its time in office. "Having got rid of John Howard," she writes, "how the hell have we managed to ensure that it is the Howard legacy and not a reformist Labor legacy that is still central to the national narrative?" "It is a bitter fact for my side of politics that the Howard years are still with us."

=== Criticism of Gillard ===
Tales from the Political Trenches puts the blame for Labor's electoral woes squarely on the shoulders of Julia Gillard, whom she accuses of being directly involved in the plot to dump Prime Minister Rudd. McKew says Ms Gillard has never had a future policy agenda, "only a plan to knock off" Kevin Rudd.

McKew also has some criticism of Mr Rudd's first term. "As a government, we didn't care much about a genuine contest of ideas," she writes. "Where he needed to charm, he scolded. Instead of cultivating loyalists among backbenchers, too often he ignored them. He is a leader who makes few allowances for people who don't share his own obsessions or can't work to his timetable," she writes.
