= Kerry O'Brien (journalist) =

Australian television journalist and presenter

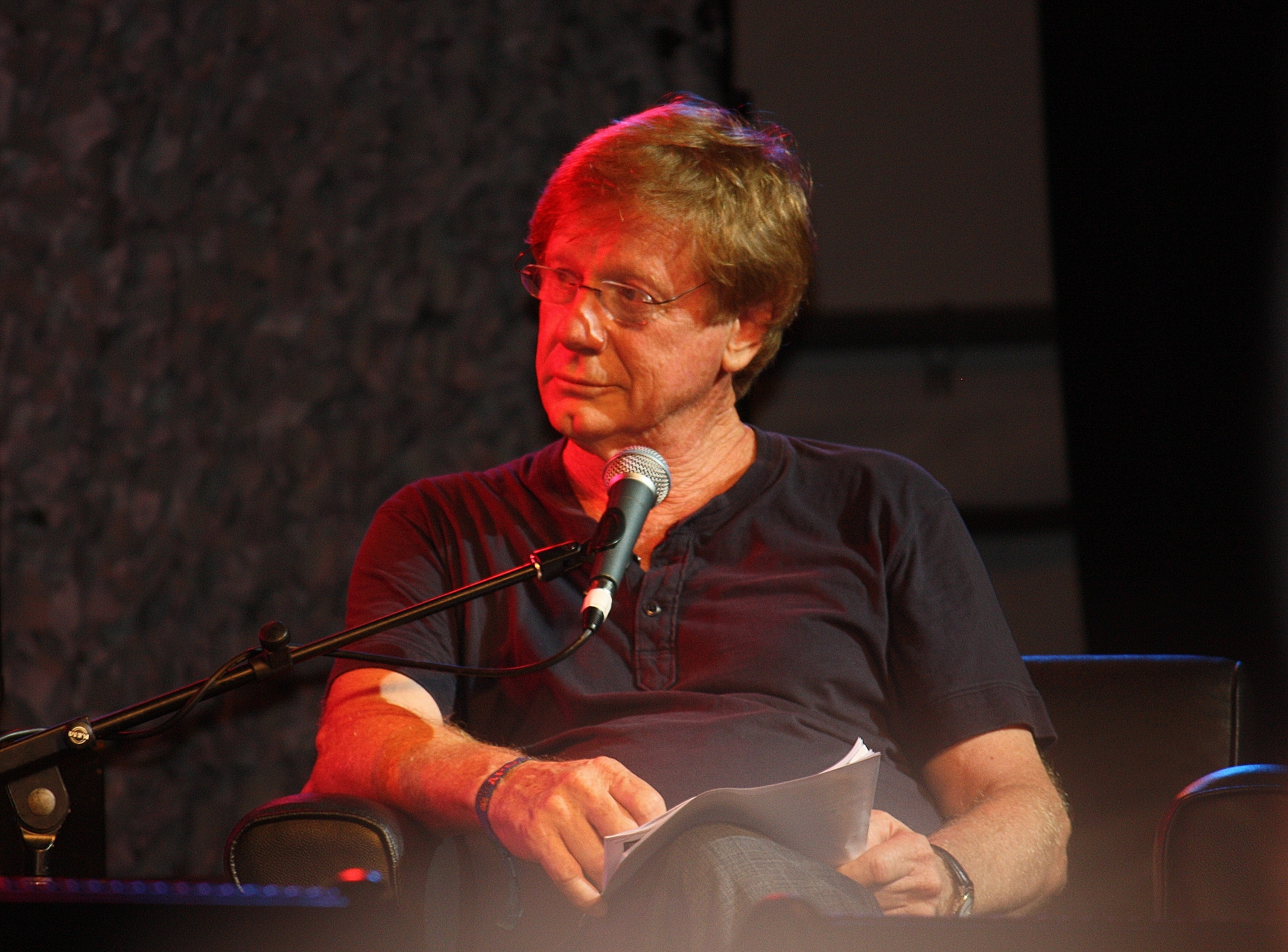
- O'Brien at the 2009 Woodford Folk Festival
- Born: Kerry Michael O'Brien; 27 August 1945 (age 81); Brisbane, Queensland, Australia
- Education: Queensland University of Technology; University of Queensland
- Occupation: Journalist
- Years active: 1966–present
- Employer: Australian Broadcasting Corporation
- Website: kerryobrien.com.au

Kerry Michael O'Brien (born 27 August 1945) is an Australian journalist based in Byron Bay. He is the former editor and host of The 7.30 Report and Four Corners on the Australian Broadcasting Corporation (ABC). He has been awarded six Walkley Awards during his career.

== Life and career ==
O'Brien was born into a Catholic family in Brisbane, Queensland, where he attended St Laurence's College. He started as a news cadet at Channel 9 in Brisbane in 1966. He has worked in newspapers, wire service Australian Associated Press and television news and current affairs, as a general reporter, feature writer, political and foreign correspondent, interviewer and compere, and served as press secretary to Labor leader Gough Whitlam. O'Brien worked for Network Ten and Seven network. O'Brien said: "I guess it was my curiosity that drove my attraction to political journalism—and drove my desire to work for Gough Whitlam when that opportunity came up—because I wanted to see what it was like behind the scenes. I wanted to see what it was like to be a part of the process, rather than just reporting on it. When I came back to journalism, I realised that the experience I'd had in the back rooms of politics was like gold for me—in terms of being able to understand and second guess what was really going on behind that sort of opaque screen that the political processes, the processes of government throw up."

=== The 7.30 Report ===
After six years as compere and interviewer of the Australian Broadcasting Corporation's Lateline program, on 4 December 1995 O'Brien moved to The 7.30 Report as editor, compère and interviewer. He also anchored and moderated the ABC's election telecasts for 20 years. O'Brien has won many awards, including the top award in Australian journalism, the Gold Walkley in 2000. He has also made several appearances on The Chaser's War on Everything.

With respect to effective interviewing, O'Brien has said that "It's very much about being prepared. Think through the issues related to what you're talking about—think them through. Look for the logic. Try to understand as best you can, then you try and cut to the heart of the issue in the same way, I suppose, a lawyer might."

O'Brien announced in September 2010 that he would be resigning as the editor and presenter of The 7.30 Report at the end of the year and would move on to new roles within the ABC in 2011. He concluded his time at The 7.30 Report on 9 December.

=== Four Corners ===
On 14 October 2010, the ABC announced that O'Brien would host Four Corners, beginning in 2011. On 6 November 2015, O'Brien announced he would be stepping down as host of Four Corners. He was succeeded by Sarah Ferguson in 2016.

=== Awards ===
During his career as a journalist, O'Brien has won six Walkley Awards for his journalistic work. His first two awards came in 1982, when he won the award for the best television current affairs report and the ceremony's top award, the Gold Walkley. He again received awards in 1991 and 2000. In 2010, his final year on The 7.30 Report, he received two awards: one for broadcast interviewing and the other for journalism leadership.

He has been awarded two honorary doctorates, a Doctor of the University from the Queensland University of Technology in April 2009 and a Doctor of Letters honoris causa from the University of Queensland in December 2011.

In 2011, O'Brien was a recipient of the Queensland Greats Awards.

In 2019, O'Brien was inducted into the Logie Hall of Fame.

In 2021, O'Brien was appointed an Officer of the Order of Australia, but declined the award in protest at Margaret Court's receipt of the Companion of the Order of Australia.

=== Books ===
- O'Brien, Kerry (2015). Keating. Sydney: Allen & Unwin. ISBN 978-1-76011-162-5. OCLC 927420089.
- O'Brien, Kerry (2018). Kerry O'Brien: a memoir. Sydney, New South Wales, Australia: Allen & Unwin. ISBN 978-1-76063-787-3. OCLC 1059403201.

== Personal life ==
O'Brien has been married twice and has six children, three from his first marriage and three with Sue Javes, who he married in 1981.

== Political views ==
O'Brien, the son of university-educated hospital administrator, says that in his head his youth was "working class". Educated by the Christian Brothers, he became a non-believer in his mid-20s, but said in 2015: "I don't regret the Catholic culture I was exposed to in terms of social justice and basic fairness, that sense of all people being born equal." O'Brien worked as press secretary to the sacked Labor prime minister Gough Whitlam in 1977, while Whitlam was Opposition Leader. After Whitlam lost the 1977 election, O'Brien worked for deputy Labor leader Lionel Bowen.

In interviews O'Brien has said of South African president Nelson Mandela that "To be close to that kind of greatness, I would regard as a privilege." He described US president Barack Obama as having a "generous nature", former Soviet president Mikhail Gorbachev as "impressive" and British prime minister Margaret Thatcher as "looking down her nose at you". In 1988, Thatcher terminated an interview with O'Brien and, by O'Brien's account: "She hissed, 'You just had to go too far.'"

Former conservative Liberal prime minister John Howard wrote in his autobiography Lazarus Rising that "the politics of Kerry O'Brien, presenter of the ABC's 7.30 Report were a mile away from mine. Yet I appeared regularly on his program, because it was a serious current affairs presentation". Of the 1996 prime ministerial election debates, Howard wrote: "I flatly refused to have Kerry O'Brien of the ABC [moderate the debates] because of the way he had handled the second Keating-Hewson debate in 1993" (in which, Howard wrote, O'Brien "went in to bat" for Keating).

O'Brien opposed the Howard government's budget cuts to the ABC, and said the appointment of Jon Shier as its Managing Director was a manifestation of the "conservative obsession with the ABC as a kind of biased, left-wing culture".

After retiring from the 7.30 Report, O'Brien presented the 2013 ABC series Keating: the Interviews (Note: Keating: the Interviews was published as a two-disc DVD set by the ABC. Events and personalities, discussed with characteristic frankness, are illustrated with historic photographs and footage.) from which he wrote a biography of former Labor prime minister Paul Keating, who co-operated with O'Brien rather than write an autobiography.

O'Brien welcomed the replacement of Liberal prime minister Tony Abbott by the less conservative Malcolm Turnbull in 2015, telling Fairfax that it was "a little burst of sunlight nationally" and that "There's a surge of relief because things were so bad."

In his 2019 induction speech to the Logie Hall of Fame, O'Brien voiced his support for the Uluru Statement from the Heart and called on the Australian Parliament, during the current term, to "make a genuine effort to understand and support what is embodied in the Uluru Statement From the Heart". He added "the Uluru statement represents no threat to a single individual in any corner of this country, and certainly no threat to the integrity of Parliament. And if you're told that, don't you believe it. On the contrary, it will add much to the integrity of our nation."

== Notes ==
Media offices
| Preceded by Originator | Lateline; Presenter; 1990–1995 | Succeeded by Maxine McKew |
| Preceded by Separate state editions | The 7.30 Report; National presenter 4 December 1995 – 9 December 2010 | Succeeded by Leigh Sales and Chris Uhlmann as 7.30 |
| Preceded by Liz Jackson (Until 1999); Unpresented (1999–2010) | Four Corners; Presenter; February 2011 – November 2015 | Succeeded by Sarah Ferguson |
