= Lateline =

Former Australian TV news program

- Genre: News and current affairs
- Presented by: Emma Alberici (2012–2017); Ali Moore (2011); Leigh Sales (2008–2010); Virginia Trioli (2007–2008); Tony Jones (1999–2016); Maxine McKew (2001–2006, 1995–1999); Kerry O'Brien (1990–1995)
- Country of origin: Australia
- Original language: English
- No. of seasons: 28

Production
- Producer: ABC News and Current Affairs
- Production locations: Sydney, New South Wales
- Editor: Chris Schembri
- Running time: 30 minutes

Original release
- Network: ABC; ABC News (2010–2017)
- Release: 13 February 1990 – 8 December 2017

Related
- The Business (2006–present)

Lateline is an Australian television news program which ran from 1990 until 2017. The program initially aired weeknights on ABC TV. In later years it was also broadcast internationally throughout Asia and the Pacific on the Australia Plus Satellite Network, and on the 24-hour ABC News Channel.

The late evening current affairs program developed a longstanding reputation for setting the agenda of the following days' news across the continent. It was well known to feature head-to-head debates on current issues, hard hitting political interviews, and attracted the appearance of many world leaders in industry, politics and media. It was labelled by the influential Australian online website Crikey magazine as being, "an unmissable current affairs program that almost certainly creates more headlines in the next day's newspapers than any other TV show in the country." The program's late timeslot in AEST benefited enormously from its favourable alignment with overseas correspondents.

== History ==
When Lateline premiered on 13 February 1990, it was a thirty-minute single-topic debate forum hosted by Kerry O'Brien, broadcast nationally on ABC-TV from Canberra. Airing on Tuesday, Wednesday and Thursday nights in 1990 and 1991, and expanding to Monday to Thursday from 1992 onwards, the program opened with a short video piece examining the perceived most compelling topic at hand in news and current affairs on the given day with disciplined, journalistic balance. O'Brien then followed the video with a moderated debate between two and four participants for the duration of the program. It was later hosted by Maxine McKew who retired from broadcasting in 2006 to pursue a political career with the Australian Labor Party. Later hosts included Tony Jones, Leigh Sales, Ali Moore, and Emma Alberici.

The most notable aspect of the format when it premiered was that many guests appeared via satellite. Whether in the studio or on the other side of the world all the guests would appear as 'remote', on TV monitors beside the host. The time slot of the program greatly improved the prospective line up of the overseas contributors and enabled the show to interpolate the Australian perspective with relevant, international viewpoints.

In 2000, the program was moved from Canberra to the TV network's headquarters in Sydney. Lateline thereafter incorporated the ABC Late News, a ten-minute news-break style rundown of the day's top stories and important events from the day.

In October 2017, the ABC announced that after 28 years Lateline would be cut as the broadcaster launches new investigative and specialist journalism teams. The management of the Australian Broadcasting Corporation announced the termination of the Lateline program, after 28 years on air, on 5 October 2017, though assuring its full resources until the end of the Australian TV season in December of the same year. The Corporation's news and current affairs chief, Gaven Morris, cited the demise of the program as being due to changes in audience preference and digital disruption from the internet. The Australian non-commercial broadcaster has proposed a new approach to in-depth, investigative reporting, also announcing a new program and improved multi-platform support for other, existing programs.

== Presenters, reporters, and producers ==
The show was hosted by Emma Alberici in its final years. Alberici was appointed as the co host of the program with Tony Jones in 2012.

Esteemed reporters on the program included Margot O'Neill, John Stewart, Kerry Brewster, Ginny Stein, Jason Om, Jamie Cummins, David Lipson, Barbara Miller, Helen Vatsikopoulos and Matt Wordsworth.

Former presenters included: Kerry O'Brien, Mark Colvin, Maxine McKew, Virginia Trioli, Leigh Sales, Ali Moore, Ticky Fullerton, and Tony Jones.

Recipients of Walkley Awards from Lateline include Maxine McKew in 1998 and Tony Jones, who received Walkley awards for broadcast interviewing in 2004, 2007 and 2011. Reporter Suzanne Smith in 2005 won a Logie Award for "Most Outstanding News Coverage" for her story about sexual abuse in Aboriginal communities in the Northern Territory.

== See also ==
- List of longest-running Australian television series
- List of programs broadcast by ABC (Australian TV network)
- List of Australian television series
