= Landline (TV program) =

- Presented by: Pip Courtney
- Country of origin: Australia
- Original language: English
- No. of seasons: 34

Production
- Running time: 55 minutes

Original release
- Network: ABC Television
- Release: 11 March 1991 – present

Landline is an Australian weekly television program broadcast on ABC Television since 1991. It reports on rural, agricultural and environmental issues, particularly as they relate to farmers and regional livelihoods.

== History ==
The program premiered on 11 March 1991 at 11:30 am, replacing Countrywide and hosted by former host of Countrywide, Doug Murray. By October 1991, Doug Murray had departed from the program and with a format change and a new host Cathie Schnitzerling (née Phillips), it moved to 12:00 pm by November 1991.

Landline was the first program that broadcast on ABC2 when the channel was launched at 6:35 am on 7 March 2005.

By 2018 it moved to screen each Sunday from 12:30pm on ABC TV & 4pm on ABC News with an encore available on ABC iview.

== Presenters ==
As of November 2024, Landline is presented by Pip Courtney, who has hosted the program since 2012.

Previous presenters include Deborah Knight, Cathie Schnitzerling, Doug Murray, Ticky Fullerton, Anne Kruger and Sally Sara.

== Description ==
The program discusses rural issues "ranging across agri-politics and economics, business and product innovation, animal and crop science, regional infrastructure, climate and weather trends, regional and rural services, music and lifestyle".

The program also features a Market Report, which was hosted from 1991-2020 by Kerry Lonergan. In 2021, Lonergan was replaced by ABC Country Hour presenter Matt Brann who is still presenting the Market Reports today.

Landline also features a weekly weather report from the Bureau of Meteorology.

== See also ==
- List of longest-running Australian television series
- List of programs broadcast by ABC (Australian TV network)
- List of Australian television series
- Countryfile (similar British program broadcast on BBC One)
