= 7.30 =

Australian nightly television current affairs programme

- Official logo for the show
- Genre: News; Current affairs
- Presented by: Kerry O'Brien (1995–2010); Leigh Sales (2011–2022); Sarah Ferguson (2022–present)
- Country of origin: Australia
- Original language: English

Production
- Executive producer: Joel Tozer
- Producers: Trish Drum; Jamie Cummins; Laura Kewley
- Running time: 30 minutes

Original release
- Network: ABC Television
- Release: 28 January 1986 – present

Related
- Lateline

7.30 is an Australian nightly current affairs television program which broadcasts on ABC TV and ABC News at 7:30pm on Monday to Thursday nights, hosted by Sarah Ferguson.

The half hour program follows the evening news, and is the flagship program for the network, with The Sydney Morning Herald saying "7.30 remains arguably [the ABC's] most impactful daily program. It is regularly the broadcaster's most watched on any given night."

From 1986 to 2011 it was called The 7.30 Report; in 2011 it was rebranded as 7.30 and Stateline was folded into the revamped program.

== History ==
=== The 7.30 Report ===
The 7.30 Report began on 28 January 1986, screening Tuesday to Friday evenings. The program extended to Mondays the following year.

Until the end of 1995 the program had separate editions for each state and territory, presented by Alan Carpenter, Mary Delahunty, Quentin Dempster, Trisha Goddard, Sarah Henderson, Jane Singleton, Genevieve Hussey, John Jost, Leigh McClusky, Kelly Nestor, and Andrew Olle.

Kerry O'Brien took over as the presenter of the national program on 4 December 1995, with Maxine McKew serving as the main relief presenter until 2006. O'Brien announced in 2010 that he would be leaving at the end of the year. He presented his final edition of the program on 9 December 2010.

In February 1996, the Friday episode of the show was replaced with Stateline, a similar show with a separate edition for each state and territory.

The program usually comprised several pre-recorded items and live interviews, focusing on issues of national or global significance. The program traditionally featured interviews with politicians.

Former reporters included political editor Heather Ewart, Deborah Cornwall, Greg Hoy, Mark Willacy, Michael Brissenden, Murray McLaughlin, Mary Gearin, Mike Sexton, John Taylor, Peter McCutcheon, Paul Lockyer, Lisa Whitehead, Natasha Johnson, David Mark, Genevieve Hussey, Mark Bannerman, Tracy Bowden, Matt Peacock, Andy Park, Sean Rubinsztein-Dunlop, Dylan Welch, Louise Milligan, Madeleine Morris, Conor Duffy, Monique Schafter, Alex Mann, Michael Atkin, and political editor Sabra Lane. Paul Lyneham also hosted The 7.30 Report for several years.

Until 2010, satirists John Clarke and Bryan Dawe presented a (usually) weekly mock interview covering a topical issue. Dawe played the interviewer, while Clarke played a prominent public figure but, unusually for satire, he deliberately made no attempt to imitate the appearance, voice, or mannerisms of the person he portrayed. When portraying Julia Gillard he placed a flower pot behind him to give the impression of him being a woman. These interviews were a continuation of the pair's work for A Current Affair, beginning in 1989, for which they won a number of awards.

=== 2011 changes ===
The ABC announced in December 2010 that the program would return in 2011 in a new form, under the name 7.30. The revamped program was first presented by Leigh Sales from Sydney. Chris Uhlmann was 7.30's first political editor and Canberra presenter.

The ABC also announced that Stateline would be folded into the 7.30 program. The change saw 7.30 extended to five nights a week, although Friday editions continued to be presented locally and focus on state affairs.

The program first aired on 7 March 2011.

In 2012, Uhlmann was appointed as 7.30 political editor, therefore stepping down as host. Uhlmann remained as political editor until 2013, when he announced that he would be working on a documentary about the Rudd and Gillard governments for the ABC. Sabra Lane replaced him as political editor, until she left to host the ABC morning radio current affairs program, AM.

In 2015, Jo Puccini was appointed executive producer of the program.

In December 2016, the ABC announced that Andrew Probyn would replace Sabra Lane as political editor. In August 2017, Probyn moved to a new role as the ABC's political editor replacing Chris Uhlmann who left the broadcaster for the Nine Network.

In February 2018, Laura Tingle was appointed as political editor, replacing Probyn.

In 2014, Sarah Ferguson hosted the show whilst Leigh Sales was on maternity leave. She received critical acclaim for her hard-hitting interview style from many Australian media outlets.

In 2018, Justin Stevens was appointed executive producer.

In February 2022, Sales announced that she would be stepping down as host, after almost 12 years in the role. She finished hosting the program in June, after the federal election, but continued to work for the ABC.

In April 2022, ABC announced that Sarah Ferguson would return from her role as special correspondent in Washington, D.C. to succeed Sales as the host of 7.30 from July 2022.

Joel Tozer was announced as the new executive producer of the program in June 2022, taking over from Justin Stevens, who was appointed director of news for the network.

In May 2025, ABC announced that Laura Tingle would be departing 7.30 after six years to take on a new role as global affairs editor. Tingle was replaced by Jacob Greber, former chief digital political correspondent at the ABC.

== Hosts ==
Presenter	Tenure
Kerry O'Brien	1995–2010
Leigh Sales	2011–2022
Chris Uhlmann	2011–2012
Sarah Ferguson	2022–present

David Speers is currently a fill-in presenter.

=== Political editor ===
Presenter	Tenure
Chris Uhlmann	2012–2013
Sabra Lane	2013–2016
Andrew Probyn	2016–2017
Laura Tingle	2018–2025
Jacob Greber	2025–present

== State editions ==
On 28 November 2014, veteran journalist Quentin Dempster announced that the state and territory editions of the nearly twenty-year long program the 7.30 report were being axed by Managing Director Mark Scott. Dempster announced that the final state and territory editions would be broadcast the following week (5 December 2014), corresponding with his departure from the public broadcaster.

Prior to this specific versions of ABC 7.30 (NSW, VIC, TAS, ACT, NT, WA, QLD, SA) were broadcast at 7:30 p.m. in each state and territory and each local version was then broadcast nationally on ABC News over the weekend.

== See also ==
- List of longest-running Australian television series
- List of Australian television series
- List of programs broadcast by ABC (Australian TV network)
