= ABC Board =

Governing board of the Australian Broadcasting Corporation

The ABC Board is the body responsible for the operations of the Australian Broadcasting Corporation. Kim Williams AM is chair; Hugh Marks the managing director appointed by the board; Laura Tingle is a staff-elected member. The chair and other directors are chosen by the Australian Government.

== Composition, structure and responsibilities ==
The ABC Board is a board of directors that is responsible for the operations of the Australian Broadcasting Corporation. It is made up of five to seven directors chosen by the Australian government, and a managing director who is appointed by the board itself. At various times, ABC staff have been granted rights to elect a nominee for appointment to the board; and as of April 2013 staff elected a nominee-director. The duties of the board, as set out in the Australian Broadcasting Corporation Act 1983, commonly called the ABC Act, (section 8) include duties "to ensure that the functions of the Corporation are performed efficiently and with the maximum benefit to the people of Australia; to maintain the independence and integrity of the Corporation; and to ensure that the gathering and presentation by the Corporation of news and information is accurate and impartial according to the recognized standards of objective journalism".

The Governor-General, on the recommendation of the Federal Government, appoints members, as specified in the ABC Act. The ABC Act specifies that Directors must be experienced in broadcasting, communications or management, or have expertise in financial or technical matters, or have cultural or other interests relevant to the provision of broadcasting services. Each director serves a term of five years, with eligibility for reappointment at the end of this term.

Directors are expected to follow the ABC Board Protocol, which stipulates responsibilities, expectations, rights, and benefits.

The board maintains an Advisory Council, which advises it on matters concerning the Corporation's programming. The Council is made up of twelve members, broadly representative of the Australian community, which serve staggered four-year terms. Vacancies are advertised in September–October each year. The Advisory Council's current Chairman is Dr Jane Munro, Head of International House at the University of Melbourne.

== Process of appointment ==
The Minister for Communications nominates candidates to the Governor-General for appointment to the ABC Board; based on a shortlist prepared by an independent, government-appointed, nomination panel. As of April 2018, members of the panel were former Treasury Secretary and Westpac Chairman, Ted Evans AC (Chairman); company director and lawyer, Dr Sally Pitkin; public relations media director and former broadcaster, Anne Fulwood; and former Australian Public Service Commissioner and departmental secretary, Helen Williams.

Appointments to the board made by successive governments have often resulted in criticism of the appointees' political affiliation, background, and relative merit. From 2003 the Howard government also made several controversial appointments to the ABC Board, including Albrechtsen, a prominent critic, Ron Brunton, and Keith Windschuttle.

During their 2007 federal election campaign, Labor announced plans to introduce a new system, similar to that of the BBC, for appointing members to the board. Under this new system, now in place, ABC candidates are considered by a panel established "at arm's length" from the Communications Minister. If the Minister chose someone not on the panel's shortlist, the Minister would be required to justify their selection to Australian Parliament. The Chairman of the ABC is nominated by the Prime Minister and endorsed by the Leader of the Opposition.

== Current board members ==
List of current ABC Board members as of January 2025
Name	Functional role	Term start	Notes / reference
Kim Williams	Chair	7 March 2024	Term ends 6 March 2029
Hugh Marks	Managing director	7 March 2025	
Laura Tingle	Staff-elected director	1 May 2023	Term ends 30 April 2028
Katrina Sedgwick			
Georgie Somerset		23 February 2017	Term ends 22 February 2027
Mario D’Orazio		13 May 2021	Term ends 12 May 2026
Nicolette Maury			
Louise McElvogue		16 October 2023	Term ends 15 October 2028

== Notable people ==
=== Chairs ===
No.	Name	Start of term	End of term	Notes
1	Sir Charles Lloyd Jones	1932	1934	
2	William James Cleary	1934	1945	
3	Sir Richard Boyer KBE	1 April 1945	5 June 1961	Instigated the Boyer Lectures in 1959. Died in office.
4	Sir James Darling CMG OBE	1 July 1961	May 1967	
5	Sir Robert Madgwick OBE	1 July 1967	30 June 1973	
6	Professor Richard Downing	1 July 1973	10 November 1975	Died in office
7	Sir Henry Bland	July 1976	December 1976	
8	John D Norgard	1976	1981	
9	Dame Leonie Kramer AC DBE	1982	30 June 1983	
10	Ken Myer AC DSC	1 July 1983	1986	
11	David Hill	1986	1987	Resigned as Chair to take up appointment as Managing Director
12	Bob Somervaille	1987	1991	
13	Mark Armstrong	1991	23 July 1996	
14	Donald McDonald AC	24 July 1996	31 December 2006	
15	Maurice Newman AC	1 January 2007	31 December 2011	
16	Steven Skala AO	1 January 2012	31 March 2012	Acting Chair
17	James Spigelman AC QC	1 April 2012	31 March 2017	
18	Justin Milne FAICD	1 April 2017	27 September 2018	Resigned
19	Kirstin Ferguson	28 September 2018	27 February 2019	Acting Chair
20	Ita Buttrose AC OBE	28 February 2019	6 March 2024	
21	Kim Williams AM	7 March 2024	6 March 2029	

=== Notable directors ===
Name	Start of term	End of term	Notes
Janet Albrechtsen	24 February 2005	18 February 2010	
John Bannon AO	24 July 1994	July 1999	
Cheryl Bart AO	3 June 2010		
Neville Bonner	1 July 1983		
Ron Brunton	1 May 2003	30 April 2008	
Quentin Dempster			Elected by staff
Kirstin Ferguson	12 November 2015	November 2020	
John Gallagher QC	9 December 1999	23 February 2008	
Di Gribble AM			
Vanessa Guthrie	23 February 2017	March 2021	
Earle Hackett	1973		
Ramona Koval	2002	2006	Elected by staff
Michael Kroger	1998	February 2003	
Michael Lynch	March 2009		
Ian Macphee AO	9 December 1994		
Matt Peacock	2013		Elected by staff
Professor Julianne Schultz AM		1 October 2014	
Steven Skala AO	6 October 2005		
Dr Fiona Stanley AC FAA	30 June 2011	2016	
Keith Windschuttle	June 2006		

=== Managers ===
No.	Title	Name	Start of term	End of term	Notes
1	General Manager	Harold Parkyn Williams	1 August 1932	4 March 1933	Died in office
2	General Manager	Major Walter Tasman Conder	1 April 1933	25 June 1935	
3	General Manager	Sir Charles Moses	1 November 1935	21 January 1965	
4	General Manager	Sir Talbot Duckmanton	26 February 1965	1 July 1982	
5	General Manager	Keith Jennings	13 August 1982	5 May 1983	
6	Managing director	Geoffrey Whitehead	23 January 1984	31 December 1986	
7	Managing director	David Hill	1 January 1987	25 February 1995	
8	Managing director	Brian Johns	17 March 1995	17 March 2000	
9	Managing director	Jonathan Shier	17 March 2000	31 December 2001	
10	Managing director	Russell Balding	29 May 2002	25 March 2006	
11	Managing director	Mark Scott	5 July 2006	29 April 2016	
12	Managing director	Michelle Guthrie	1 May 2016	24 September 2018	
13	Managing director	David Anderson	3 May 2019	7 March 2025	
14	Managing director	Hugh Marks	10 March 2025	present	

== Criticism ==
Past appointments have been associated directly with political parties—five of fourteen appointed chairmen have been accused of political affiliation or friendship, including Richard Downing and Ken Myer (both of whom publicly endorsed the Australian Labor Party at the 1972 election), as well as Sir Henry Bland. David Hill was close to Neville Wran, while Donald McDonald was considered to be a close friend of John Howard.

In the past, appointments of commissioners and directors also drew criticism. In the 1932, a majority of the commissioners were publicly conservative. This continued to 1942, when the Curtin and Chifley administrations appointed a more 'politically balanced' commission.

Once elected to power, Labor prime minister Whitlam replaced the entire board—appointed by Liberal governments over the previous 23 years—with supporters of the Labor Party. His successor, Malcolm Fraser, attempted unsuccessfully to take similar action by replacing the board with politically conservative commissioners in 1976, but was only able to make new appointments by adding two extra director positions onto the board.

In 1983, Minister John Button referred proposed board appointments to an all-party committee for the first time. This practice was discontinued before the end of Paul Keating's government. Alan Ramsey, in a 1996 article for The Sydney Morning Herald noted that:

"12 came from overt political backgrounds, among them a former Labor premier, a former Liberal senator, a former Liberal Cabinet minister, four trade union activists, four advisers to various State Labor administrations, and Labor's former opinion pollster, Rod Cameron." In short, "less than half Labor's ABC appointments over the years have had obvious party political connections, while two of them came from among the ranks of its political opponents."

A 2006 restructure of the ABC board, undertaken by the Howard government, abolished the position of staff elected director. The elected director was previously nominated and elected by employees of the ABC. Nominees for this director office were to have been employed at least 24 hours a week by the ABC and the term of office was two years with eligibility for re-election to a second term. An elected director was not eligible for a third term of office. Broadcaster Ramona Koval had occupied the position for the previous four years prior to its abolition amid ongoing intense controversy. This drew criticism from the Labor Party, Australian Greens, and the Democrats, who saw it as a 'revenge measure' taken against the Corporation.

In July 2007, Labor announced plans to make the system of appointments to the board independent of the Minister for Communications; and also reinstate the staff election of a nominee director. Initial members of the independent panel were Gonski, Smith, Allan Fels and Leneen Forde.

In September 2018, there was criticism raised by Labor's Shadow Communications Minister Michelle Rowland about ABC's "independence and integrity of Australia's most trusted news organisation risk having been compromised" following discussions within the ABC board about an email instruction from Justin Milne to Michelle Guthrie in May 2018 to sack senior presenter Emma Alberici, on the basis that what was reported by Alberici did not agree with the government.

On 24 September 2018, Justin Milne announced to ABC staff that Managing Director Michelle Guthrie was sacked following discussions with the ABC executive and directors. Milne then announced his resignation on 27 September. Communications Minister Mitch Fifield has directly appointed a majority of the current members of the board, some of whom were rejected by the nomination panel.

== See also ==
- History of the Australian Broadcasting Corporation
