= East Rockingham Waste to Energy =

Waste facility in East Rockingham, Western Australia

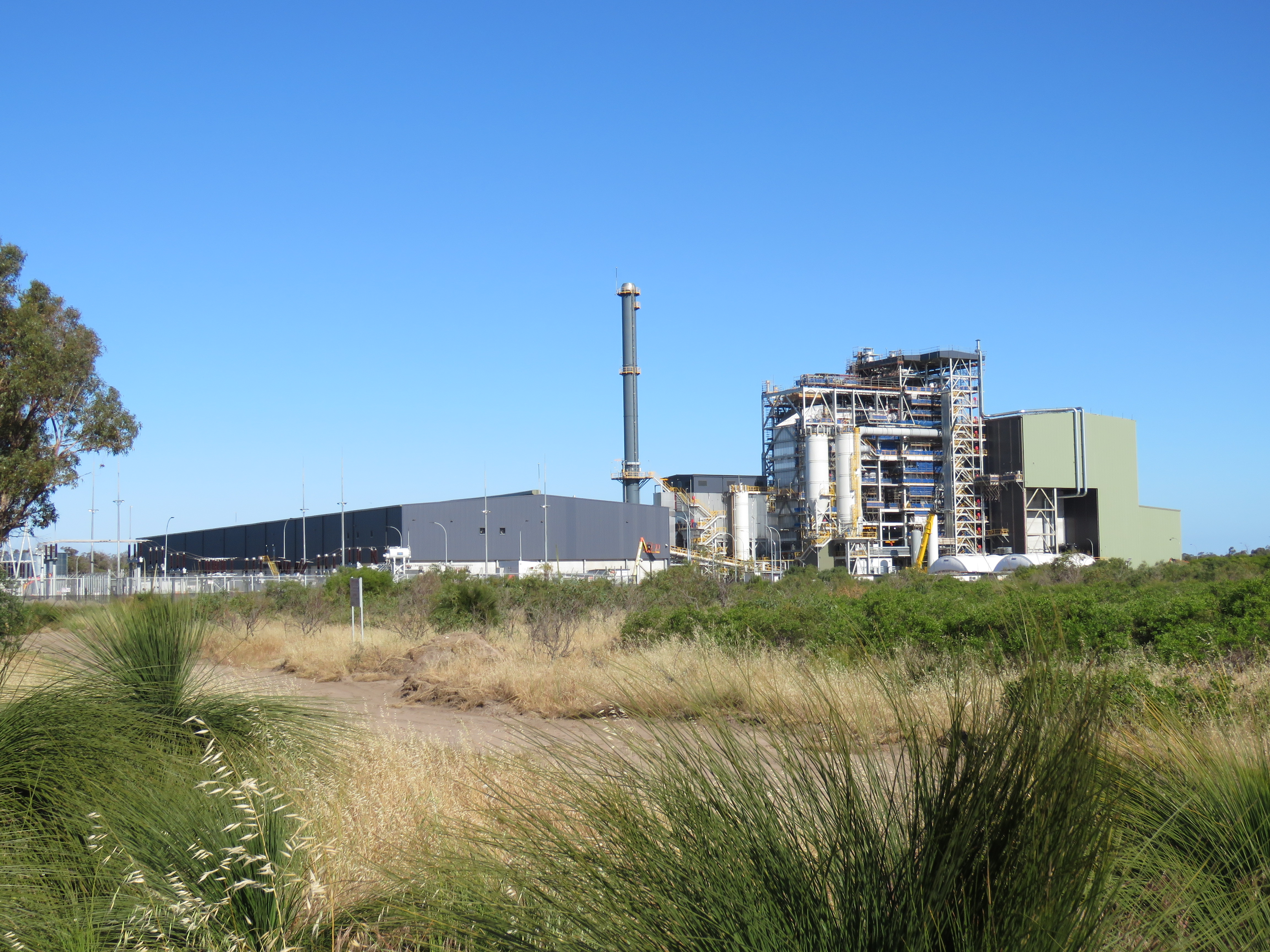
- The East Rockingham Waste to Energy facility in November 2024
- Location of the East Rockingham Waste to Energy Plant in Perth, Western Australia
- Country: Australia
- Location: East Rockingham, Western Australia
- Coordinates: 32°15′04″S 115°46′29″E
- Status: Under construction
- Construction began: May 2020
- Commission date: 2024 (planned)
- Construction cost: A$511 million
- Owner: Masdar Tribe Energy John Laing Group Acciona Concesiones Hitachi Zosen Inova
- Operator: Suez
- Employees: 50

Thermal power station
- Primary fuel: Waste

Power generation
- Nameplate capacity: 29 MW

External links
- Website: erwte.com.au
- Commons: Related media on Commons

East Rockingham Waste to Energy is a waste-to-energy power station under construction located in East Rockingham, Western Australia. Once completed, the facility is scheduled to process in excess of 300,000 tonnes (660 million pounds) of waste and will produce 29 MW of power.

== Background ==
At the time of project approval, Australia generated 23 million tonnes (51 billion pounds) of waste to landfill every year, with the state of Western Australia having the lowest waste recovery and highest waste generation rate per capita in the country. The geography of Perth, situated on a sandy coastal plain and relying heavily on groundwater as a source of potable water, meant new landfill sites were unlikely to be approved in the metropolitan region and existing ones were nearing capacity. As a consequence, the Government of Western Australia encouraged local councils to end their dependency on landfills by the year 2020 as the practice was not sustainable.

== Overview ==
East Rockingham Waste to Energy, at the time of construction approval in January 2020, was the second approved waste-to-energy plant in Australia. The facility is intended to take waste otherwise destined for landfill from the Cities of Cockburn, Belmont, Kalamunda and Swan as well as the Shire of Mundaring.

The facility is jointly financed and owned by British company John Laing Group, Acciona Concesiones, Hitachi Zosen Inova as well as Masdar Tribe Energy, a subsidiary of Mubadala Investment Company.

Once in operation, the facility is projected to annually process 300,000 tonnes (660 million pounds) of general waste as well as 30,000 tonnes (66 million pounds) of biosolids, to produce 29 MW of power. As a waste produced, the facility will create 70,000 tonnes (150 million pounds) of bottom ash annually, which is destined for use as construction material.

Construction of the facility is scheduled to employ 300 people, while operation will employ 50. Construction of the facility, which began in May 2020, received A$18 million in federal funding from the Australian Renewable Energy Agency as well as $57.5 million in subordinated debt from the Federal government's Clean Energy Finance Corporation.

The facility is contracted to be operated and maintained by French company Suez once completed, with completion originally scheduled for late 2022. In late 2022 it was announced that the completion of the project had been delayed until 2023.

At the time of approval in January 2020, two other waste-to-energy plants were approved for construction in Western Australia, the Kwinana Waste to Energy Plant which will use the same incineration technology as the East Rockingham plant and will be located 4.5 kilometres (2.8 mi) away, and a plant in Port Hedland, which will use a low temperature gasification technology. Of these three plants, the Kwinana one was the first to start construction, in 2018, and is scheduled to be larger than the East Rockingham facility, designed for 400,000 tonnes (880 million pounds) of waste and scheduled to produce 36 MW of power.

Located on a 10-hectare (25-acre) site, the East Rockingham Waste to Energy facility will include a bottom ash treatment plant as part of the requirement to achieve the required landfill diversion.

The opening of the facility was delayed because of the COVID-19 pandemic, which caused disruptions and logistical problems, with the new opening date scheduled for early 2024.
