= Kwinana Energy Recovery =

Waste-to-energy facility in Kwinana Beach, Western Australia

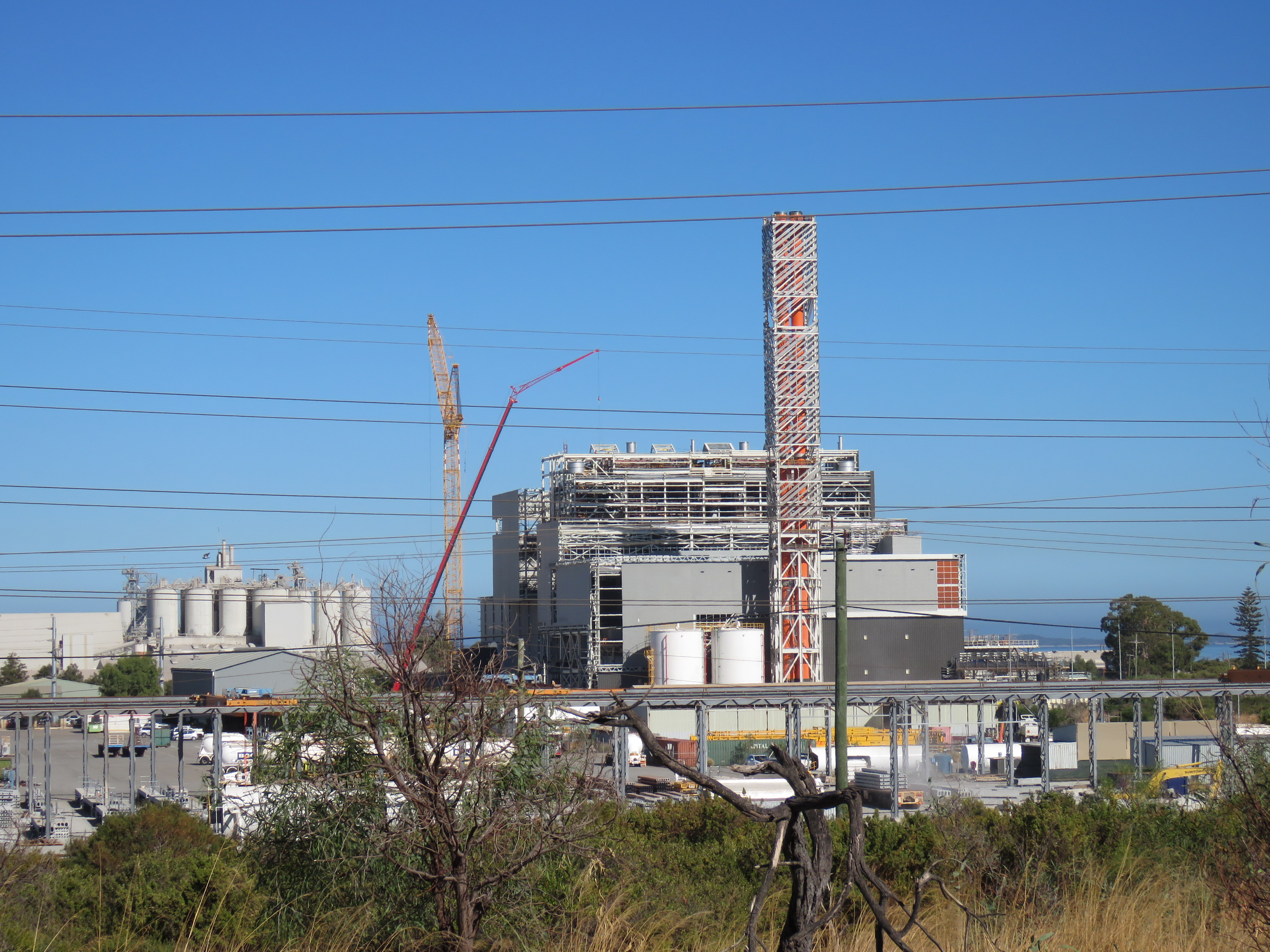
- The Kwinana Waste to Energy Plant under construction, March 2023
- Location of Kwinana Energy Recovery in Perth, Western Australia
- Country: Australia
- Location: Kwinana Beach, Western Australia
- Coordinates: 32°12′39″S 115°46′40″E
- Status: Commissioned
- Construction began: October 2018
- Construction cost: A$668 million
- Owner: Acciona
- Operator: Veolia
- Employees: 60

Thermal power station
- Primary fuel: Waste

Power generation
- Nameplate capacity: 36 MW

External links
- Website: kwinana.energy
- Commons: Related media on Commons

Kwinana Energy Recovery is a waste-to-energy power station in Kwinana Beach, Western Australia. The facility is able to process in excess of 400,000 tonnes (880 million pounds) of waste and produce 36 MW of power. Initially scheduled to open in 2021, delays pushed the projected date out to late 2024.

== History ==
=== Background ===
At the time of project approval, Australia generated 23 million tonnes of waste to landfill every year, with the state of Western Australia having the lowest waste recovery and highest waste generation rate per capita in the country. The geography of Perth, situated on a sandy coastal plain and relying heavily on groundwater as a source of potable water, meant new landfill sites were unlikely to be approved in the metropolitan region and existing ones were nearing capacity. As a consequence, the Government of Western Australia encouraged local councils to end their dependency on landfills by the year 2020 as the practice was not sustainable.

=== Construction and commissioning ===
At the start of construction in October 2018, the Kwinana Waste to Energy Plant was the first large waste-to-energy facility to be constructed in Australia. The facility is intended to take waste otherwise destined for landfill from the Cities of Armadale, Canning, Gosnells, Kwinana, Mandurah and South Perth, as well as the Shires of Murray and Serpentine-Jarrahdale. Approval of the Kwinana plant was followed by the approval of the East Rockingham Waste to Energy facility in January 2020, which is intended to take waste from the Cities of Cockburn, Belmont, Kalamunda and Swan as well as the Shire of Mundaring. A third plant in western Australia, in Port Hedland, will use a different low temperature gasification technology, something initially envisioned for the East Rockingham facility as well.

Construction of the facility would employ 800 people and cost A$668 million, while operation, carried out by Veolia, will employ 60. The construction of the facility, carried out by Acciona Construction, received A$23 million in federal funding from the Australian Renewable Energy Agency while a further $90 million in funding were provided by the Clean Energy Finance Corporation.

In November 2022, the Supreme Court of Western Australia rejected a bid by Acciona to exit the project following a two-year delay in its completion. Acciona had asked for an extension of the contract by 824 days and additional costs in the order of A$410 million to finish the project, claiming the COVID-19 pandemic as the source of delays, something the court rejected.

In March 2024, after 12 months of negotiations, Acciona bought out its partners in the project, Macquarie Capital and the Dutch Infrastructure Fund, for A$1. The latter two had valued the equity of the project at A$275 but through the deal Acciona also acquired A$396 million of the project's debts, which was discounted to A$367.4 million. The new opening date for the facility was scheduled for late 2024. The facility received its first delivery of waste on 24 July 2024. Kwinana Energy Recovery was officially opened by Roger Cook, the WA Premier and Member for Kwinana, on 14 November 2025.

== Operation ==
As of the time of approval, the Kwinana plant was scheduled to take up 25 percent of Perth's post-recycling waste that would otherwise be destined for landfill, 400,000 tonnes (880 million pounds) of domestic, commercial and industrial waste.

Power generation at Kwinana will be achieved through moving grate combustion technology, whereby the burning of waste will be used to heat steam. The waste created in the process will be reused in a brick making plant which will be located at the site.
