= Ita Buttrose =

Australian television and radio personality (born 1942)

Ita Buttrose AC OBE
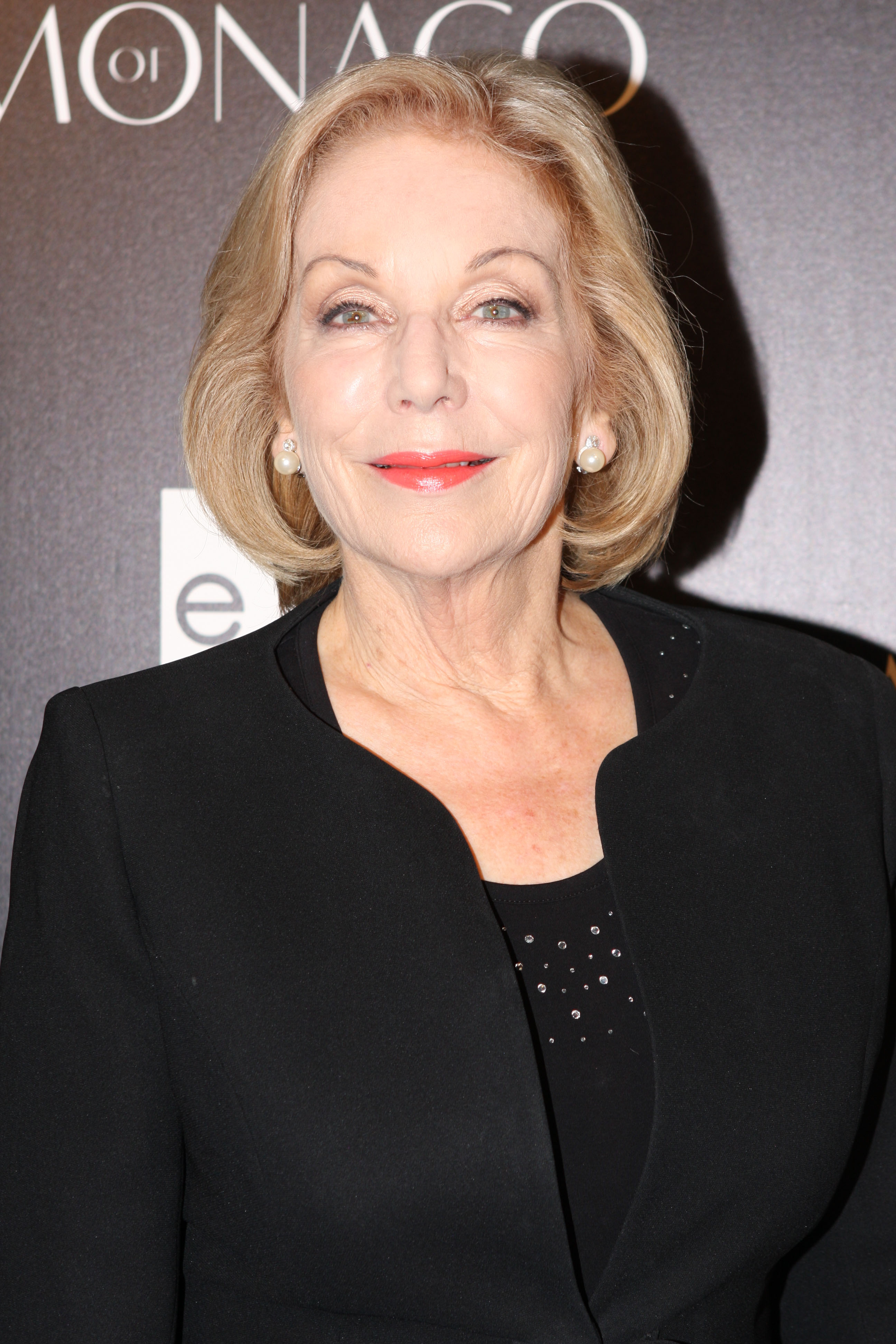
- Buttrose in June 2014

Chair of the Australian Broadcasting Corporation
- In office 28 February 2019 – 6 March 2024
- Nominated by: Scott Morrison
- Governor-General: Peter Cosgrove
- Deputy: Kirstin Ferguson
- Preceded by: Kirstin Ferguson (Acting)
- Succeeded by: Kim Williams

Personal details
- Born: Ita Clare Buttrose; 17 January 1942 (age 84) Potts Point, New South Wales, Australia
- Spouses: Alasdair Macdonald (m. 1963; div. 1976); Peter Sawyer (m. 1979; div. 1981)
- Children: 2
- Occupation: Television Network ChairMagazine editor; Fashion journalist; Media personality; Businesswoman; Author; Ambassador

Ita Clare Buttrose (born 17 January 1942) is an Australian journalist, former magazine/ newspaper editor, publishing executive, television network executive chairperson and television and radio personality, advocate, author.

Historian, Dr Lauren Samuelsson describes Buttrose as the "most powerful woman in Australian media and a household name" from 1972 to 1999.

In 1972, Buttrose was the founding editor of Cleo, a high-circulation magazine aimed at women aged 20 to 40 that was frank about sexuality (introduced liberal feminist ideas and, in its infancy, featured nude male centrefolds) and, later, the editor of the more conventional the Australian Women's Weekly. She was the youngest person to be appointed editor of The Weekly, which was then, per capita, the largest-selling magazine in the world.

Buttrose was the first woman to be editor in chief for a major Australian metropolitan newspaper, The Daily Telegraph and The Sunday Telegraph (1981 - 1984) and to join the News Limited board, chaired the National Advisory Committee on AIDS (NACAIDS) from 1984 till 1988.

In 2013, Buttrose was named the 2013 Australian of the Year.

Buttrose was a panellist on the Network Ten morning program Studio 10 from 2013 until 2018.

In 2019, Prime Minister Scott Morrison announced Buttrose as the new chair of the Australian Broadcasting Corporation (ABC). She served a five-year tenure and was succeeded by Kim Williams in March 2024.

Buttrose's tenure faced criticism for her involvement in the unlawful termination of ABC Radio Sydney presenter Antoinette Lattouf in 2023.

== Early life and education ==
Buttrose was born on 17 January 1942 in Potts Point, Sydney, and named after her maternal grandmother, Ita Clare Rodgers (née Rosenthal), pronounced /ˈaɪtə/ (rhyming with 'fighter'). She has Jewish ancestry on her maternal side. She was raised as a Catholic by her parents. Buttrose's father, Charles Oswald Buttrose, was a journalist and at one time the editor of The Daily Mirror in Sydney. By her own account she had decided on a career in journalism at the age of 11. Buttrose spent her first five years in New York City when her father was the New York correspondent for The Daily Mirror. The family returned to Australia in 1949 and settled in the harbourside suburb of Vaucluse. Her parents divorced during her teens, after 25 years of marriage, and details of her father's private life were printed in the tabloid press, causing considerable anguish to her mother. Buttrose briefly attended a private school but because her father could not afford the fees she was then moved to a public school. She completed her secondary education at Dover Heights Home Science High School, leaving at 15 to begin her career.

She started her career at Australian Consolidated Press, owned by the Packer family, working as a copy girl at The Australian Women's Weekly, then became a cadet journalist on The Daily Telegraph and The Sunday Telegraph in Sydney. Her first byline came in 1959 when the 17-year-old covered the Australian tour by Princess Alexandra.

== Career ==
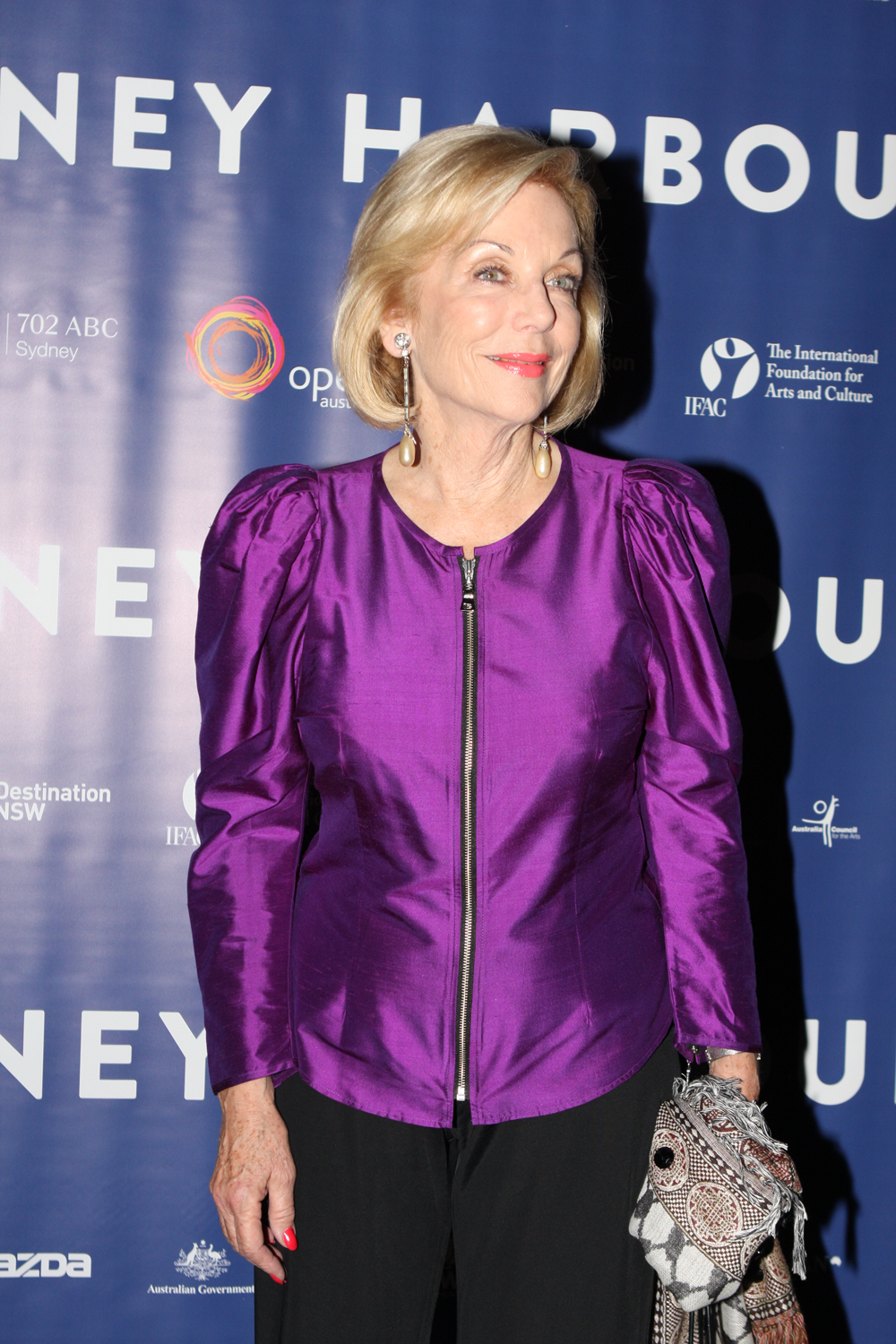
Buttrose at La Traviata at Handa Opera on Sydney Harbour 2012

Buttrose was appointed women's editor of the Telegraph at just 23 years old. In 1966 she won a racetrack fashion contest run by a rival newspaper, for which the first prize was an overseas trip, including a visit to Expo 67 in Montreal. Buttrose and her husband then stopped in England in 1967 where she worked for a time on the British national magazine Woman's Own before giving birth to her first child, a daughter, Kate. It was after her daughter's birth that she received a telegram from Sir Frank Packer, head of Australian Consolidated Press, offering her back her former job as women's editor at the Telegraph. The family then returned to Australia.

In 1971, Buttrose was chosen as founding editor of a new Australian women's magazine. This was originally intended as an Australian edition of the American magazine Cosmopolitan, but the deal fell through after Hearst Magazines sold the Cosmopolitan rights to longtime Packer rivals Fairfax; so Packer and Buttrose set about creating a new publication, dubbed Cleo, which they launched in 1972 several months ahead of its rival. Cleo was an instant hit, selling its entire original print run in just two days; the magazine broke new ground in Australian mainstream publishing, featuring the first nude male centrefold (actor Jack Thompson) and frank articles on female sexuality and other topics, leading to the inclusion of the first sealed section in an Australian magazine.

Lecturer at University of Sydney, Dr Megan Le Masurier describes Cleo as a platform "To speak to women about gender inequality and to find solutions for their lived experiences of injustice in their personal and public lives." Postdoctoral research fellow Dr Kate Farhall (RMIT) states "Cleo’s content was quite distinct from its contemporary format. Social commentary pieces such as ‘Rape - and how women can stop it,’ ‘Lesbian mothers’ and ‘Jewish women in the 70s’." Therefore, as the first Australian publicly accepted magazine of second wave feminism, Buttrose's influence of the direction of Cleo was essential to educate and create awareness of the everyday inequalities women faced in the 1970s.

During the early months of the magazine, Buttrose became pregnant with her second child, Ben, but with the grudging support of the Packers she worked through her pregnancy; an unusual feat for that time as it was still common for women to have to give up work permanently after they became pregnant.

Buttrose edited Cleo until 1975, when she was appointed editor of the Packers' flagship magazine, The Australian Women's Weekly (1975–76). She then became editor-in-chief of both publications from 1976 to 1978, before being appointed publisher of Australian Consolidated Press Women's Division from 1978 to 1981. In 1981, she left the Packers after their rival Rupert Murdoch offered her the job of editor-in-chief of the Daily Telegraph and Sunday Telegraph, making her the first female editor of a major metropolitan newspaper in Australia, a position she held until 1984; she was also appointed to the board of News Limited. During the period 1982-1983 she also had her own weekend radio talk back show simply titled Ita for the 2UE radio station. She made frequent appearances on radio and TV and in 1980, her media prominence led to her becoming the subject of the song "Ita", recorded by rock band Cold Chisel, which was included on their successful East album.

In 1984, when addressing National Press Club (Australia) she stated "I am also equally aware that female executives of newspapers and magazine companies … earn nowhere near the salaries … the male executives get." This exemplifies her honest views on pay equality and the inequality she faced as a women at the in the industry at the time.

Buttrose was invited to chair of the National Advisory Committee on AIDS (NACAIDS) from then Health Minister Neal Blewett, from 1984 until 1988 to use her skills as a communicator in breaking down homophobia and prejudice surrounding the hysteria of the disease. The committees role included national HIV/AIDS education programs and public awareness advertisements such as the controversial but successful Grim Reaper commercial. On one occasion, she appeared personally in a nationwide TV campaign to explain that donating blood at a blood bank did not pose a risk of catching AIDS (the fear of which had caused a significant drop in donations). In 1988, Buttrose also was the presenter on SBS-TV for three limited documentaries on about the effect of AIDS on the country, socially, medical spheres and the personal effect the disease has for all Australians. She later chaired the AIDS Trust of Australia from 1990 -94.

During the mid- to late 1980s, she also had a regular weekly "Ask Ita" page for the magazine Woman's Day which gave readers advice on personal issues.

After her stint with News Limited, Buttrose founded her own publishing company, Capricorn Publishing, and launched her own magazine, Ita, in 1989. Due to the recession and a decline in monthly sales the publication eventually folded and she launched a new company, the Good Life Publishing Company, which in 2005 published bark!, a lifestyle magazine aimed at dog owners.

Buttrose utilised the services of celebrity agent Max Markson to assist her with publicity and promotion.

== Television ==
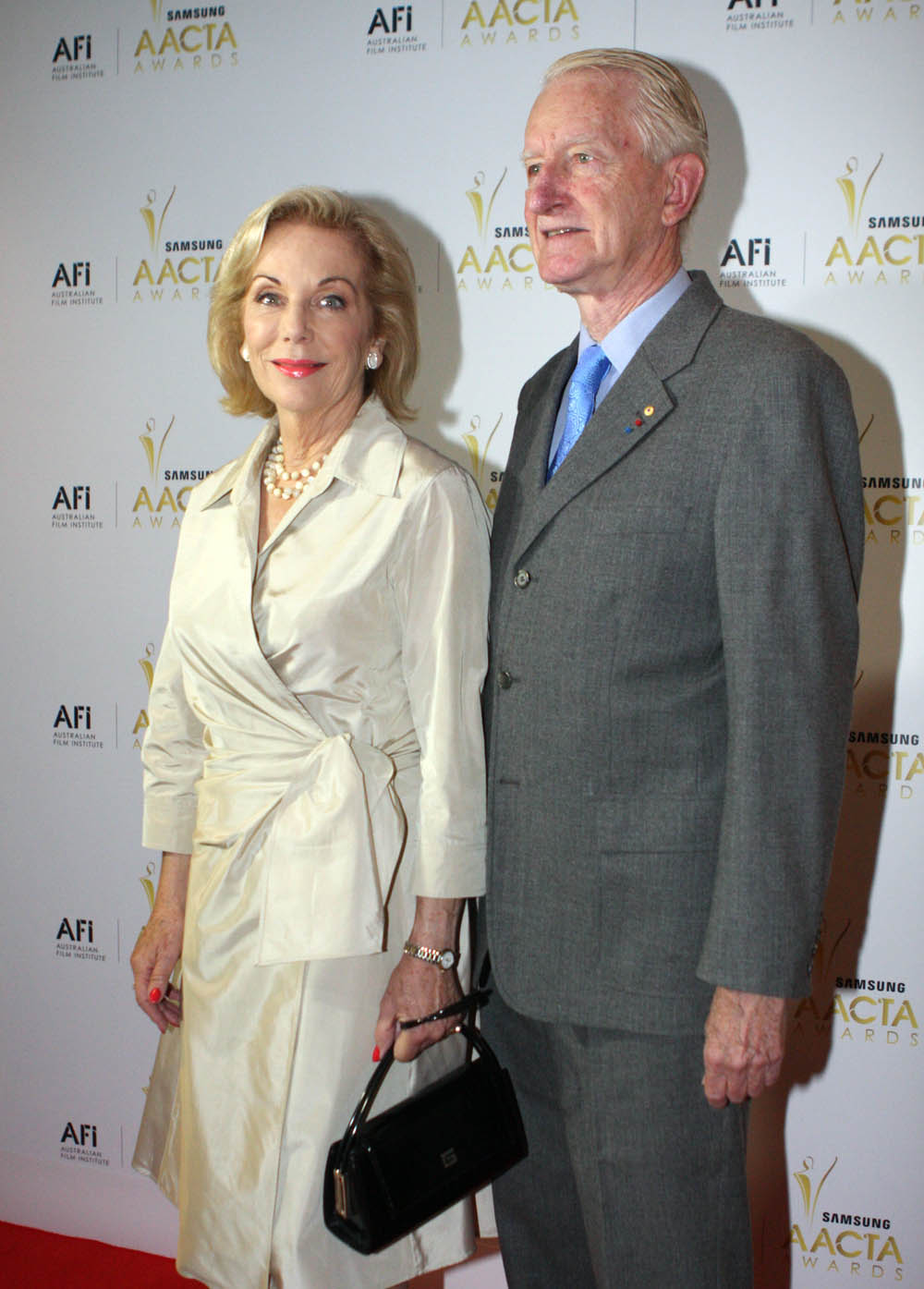
Buttrose at the AACTA Awards with Ross Steele

Buttrose was a regular on Beauty and the Beast in the 1990s and early 2000s. She was also a regular commentator on the Nine Network breakfast show Today and was at one point considered to replace Kerri-Anne Kennerley in the network's morning slot.

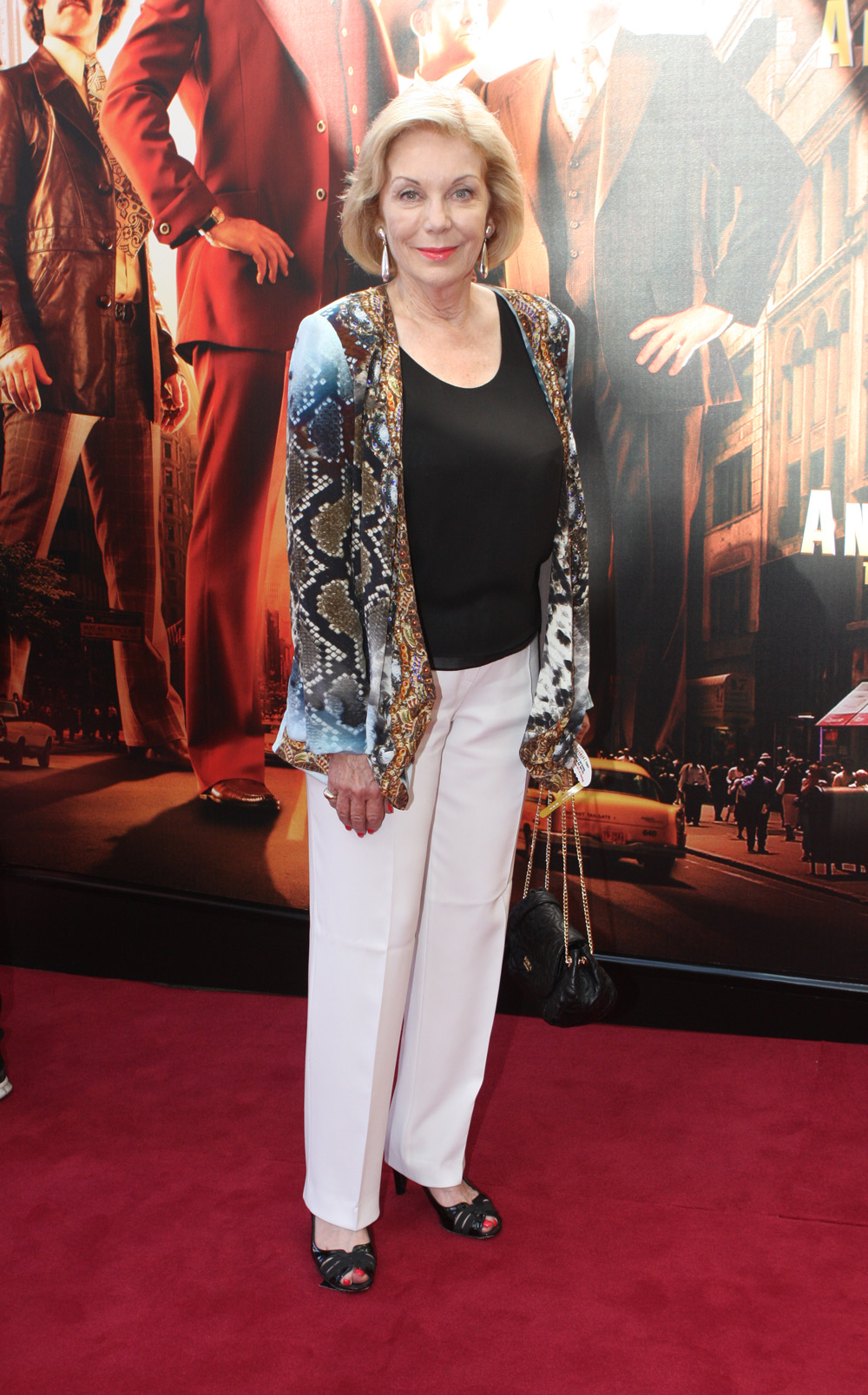
Buttrose at the premiere of Anchorman 2: The Legend Continues (2013)

In June 2013, Buttrose joined Network Ten where she hosted morning program Studio 10 two mornings a week for the station alongside Joe Hildebrand, Sarah Harris, Denise Drysdale and Jessica Rowe. The show premiered in late 2013. However, 2016 saw Buttrose reduce her appearances on the program to just twice a week to spend more time with her grandchildren.

She made a cameo appearance in episode 7547 of The Bold and the Beautiful alongside Brendan Jones and Amanda Keller as a news reporter airing in March 2017.

In April 2018, Buttrose resigned as panelist on Studio 10 to focus on other parts of her life, including spending more time with her grandchildren and writing.

Since leaving Network Ten, Buttrose has appeared on The Morning Show on the Seven Network and filled in for Sonia Kruger on Today Extra on the Nine Network.

In 2019 she was controversially appointed by Prime Minister Scott Morrison as chair of the Australian Broadcasting Corporation (ABC) for a five-year term. Morrison said he had ignored the established selection process and had decided to make a “captains pick” as he had been disappointed the independent panel had not recommended any women. She decided against seeking a second term, and was succeeded by Kim Williams in March 2024.

== Other roles and activities ==
Buttrose is also a prolific author and has published ten books, including her autobiography, A Passionate Life. In 2011, Penguin published A Guide to Australian Etiquette.

From 1993 to 1994, Buttrose was president of Chief Executive Women.

Buttrose is or has been a patron of Women of Vision, World Vision Australia, the Macular Disease Foundation of Australia, the University of the Third Age, the Juvenile Diabetes Foundation of Australia, Amarant, the National Menopause Foundation, the Sydney Women's Festival, Safety House, and the National Institute of Secretaries and Administrators.

Buttrose is also an ambassador of the Australian Women Chamber of Commerce (AWCCI) and sits on the AWCCI Advisory Board. She works on the professional speakers' circuit.

== Recognition and honours ==
Buttrose was made an Officer of the Order of the British Empire (OBE) in 1979, and appointed an Officer of the Order of Australia (AO) in 1988. In 2003, she was awarded the Centenary Medal. Buttrose was inducted to the Victorian Honour Roll of Women in 2001, and advanced to Companion of the Order of Australia (AC) in 2019.

In August 2017 Buttrose was recognised for Outstanding Lifetime Achievement at the annual Kennedy Awards for Excellence in Journalism.

In 1984 she was named the Variety Club 'Personality of the Year' as well as winning the Australasian Academy of Broadcast, Arts and Sciences for the 'Most Promising Newcomer to Radio'. In 1993 Buttrose was named Juvenile Diabetes Foundation's 'Australian of the Year'.

In April 2011, Buttrose and Cleo were the subject of the ABC-TV two-part telemovie Paper Giants: The Birth of Cleo, starring Asher Keddie as Buttrose, Rob Carlton as Kerry Packer and Tony Barry as Frank Packer.

In January 2013, Buttrose was named the 2013 Australian of the Year.

She was awarded an honorary Doctor of Letters degree by Macquarie University in 2014 in recognition of her contribution to the arts. In 2015, she was awarded a second honorary Doctor of Letters degree by the University of Wollongong for her distinguished service to Australian society and for her commitment to advocating for vulnerable people in the community. She was awarded an honorary Doctor of the university degree by the University of New South Wales in 2018 in recognition of her eminent service to health, and for being an inspirational role model for aspiring women in business and for those wanting to make a difference in society.

== Personal life ==
At 21 years of age, Buttrose married architect Alasdair "Mac" Macdonald and had two children. In 1975, while editing The Australian Women's Weekly, her marriage to Macdonald broke down and the couple divorced in 1976. Later she met Peter Sawyer and they married in 1979. By her own account it was "not a very happy marriage"; Sawyer left in 1980 and they subsequently divorced.

Buttrose cared for her father after he was diagnosed with vascular dementia. He died in 1999.

In his 2007 book Who Killed Channel Nine?, former Nine Network producer Gerald Stone claimed that Buttrose and Kerry Packer conducted a private but intense affair during Buttrose's tenure on Cleo. Stone also claimed that Packer even offered to marry her but she rejected the idea and they split after a "blazing row". Buttrose herself has repeatedly declined to comment on the matter.

== Controversies ==
In 2023 Buttrose was implicated in a controversy concerning the dismissal of ABC Radio Sydney presenter Antoinette Lattouf. Her truthfulness and her understanding of protocol and procedure at the ABC was challenged when Federal Court Justice Darryl Rangiah ordered the ABC to pay Lattouf $70,000 following the illegal actions of the ABC, Buttrose and several staff members. In response to a campaign of a WhatsApp group, Buttrose applied pressure to Lattouf's manager to have her dismissed, a claim that was explicitly reinforced by Justice Rangiah's Federal Court condemnation of the ABC's capitulation to “pro-Israel lobbyists” who had specifically used Buttrose to “cancel” Lattouf.

During Federal Court proceedings, private communications and an affidavit by ABC Managing Director David Anderson indicated that Buttrose had intervened in the termination process. The documents revealed that she pressured senior executives to remove Lattouf and forwarded several complaints by lobbyists to Chief Content Officer Chris Oliver-Taylor—allegedly bypassing the broadcaster's standard disciplinary procedures. Buttrose described Lattouf as an "activist" and the Court found she "wanted Ms Lattouf gone as soon as possible." While the Federal Court found Buttrose "placed pressure" on Oliver-Taylor to dismiss Lattouf, she did “not materially contribute” to the decision.

Critics have argued that such interventions by senior ABC management could undermine internal governance and editorial independence, and the ABC's management faced criticism for its handling over Lattouf's dismissal. The ABC had maintained until the trial's conclusion that Lattouf's dismissal adhered to its internal policies and defended the actions of Buttrose, Oliver-Taylor and David Anderson, but was later retracted in an apology by Managing Director Hugh Marks who acknowledged that “many millions of dollars have been spent that shouldn’t have been spent” and that “the matter was not handled in line with our values and expectations”.

In the UNSW Centre for Healthy Brain Ageing (CHeBA) National Webinar Event Unapologetically Ita: In Conversation with Professor Henry Brodaty AO on 18 November 2025, while promoting her autobiography, Unapologetically Ita, Buttrose made the following statements about immigration in Australia: “Well, I think we’re more divided. I don’t think the multicultural society that we’ve spoken about so proudly in Australia is working as well as it could be. And that’s because we’ve allowed divisive groups to come into Australia. But – and that’s fine. I mean, we need all points of view, but this is Australia. So I think we have to be emphatic that you try and live our way, not the way you did when you were in the country that you left to become an Australian, because most people that do come here do end up taking our citizenship.”

== Selected works ==
Buttrose has authored or co-authored many books, including:

- A Guide to Australian Etiquette (2011)
- Eating for Eye Health: the Macular Degeneration Cookbook, co-authored with Sydney chef Vanessa Jones (2009)
- Get in Shape: A complete workout for strength, health & vitality, co-authored with Lee Campbell (2007)
- Motherguilt: Australian women reveal their true feelings about Motherhood, co-authored with Dr Penny Adams (2005; reprinted 2006)
- How Much Is Enough? Your Financial Roadmap to a Happy Retirement, co- authored with Will Buttrose and Mike Galgut (2003)
- What is Love? (2000)
- A Word to the Wise (1999)
- A Passionate Life (1998; updated paperback version published 2001)
- Every Occasion: The Guide to Modern Etiquette (1985)
- Early Edition: My First Forty Years (1985)

=== Introductions ===
- Foreword: Martins, Ralph and Ragg, Mark. Understanding Alzheimer's: the complete Australian guide to the management and prevention of Alzheimer's (2013, Pan Macmillan Australia).

== TV appearances ==
Year	Title	Role	Type
1974	No Man's Land	Herself	TV series, 1 episode
1975	This Day Tonight	Herself	TV series, 1 episode
1977	Maggi Eckhardt Show	Guest	TV series, 1 episode
1978; 1981	The Don Lane Show	Guest	TV series, 2 episodes
1979	This Is Your Life: Ita Buttrose	Special guest	TV series, 1 episode
1979	This Fabulous Century	Herself	TV series, 1 episode
1979; 1981	Parkinson in Australia	Guest	TV series, 2 episodes
1980	Celebrity Tattletales	Herself	TV series
1980; 1982; 1984	The Mike Walsh Show	Guest	TV series, 3 episodes
1980	Our World with Ita Buttrose	Presenter / Narrator	TV series
1980	John Singleton	Guest	TV series, 1 episode
1981	Queensland Fashion Logie Awards	Host	TV special
1982	Beauty and the Beast	Guest panelist	TV series
1982	The Prince Philip Award For Australian Design, 1982	Host	ABC TV special
1984	Tonight with Bert Newton	Guest	TV series, 1 episode
1985	After Noon	Guest	TV series, 1 episode
1986	Late Night with Jono and Dano	Guest	TV series, 1 episode
1986	Wednesday Woman	Presenter	TV series
1986	Television: The First 30 Years	Herself	TV special
1988	Late Night Oz	Guest	TV series, 1 episode
1989	The Bert Newton Show	Guest	TV series, 1 episode
1989; 1992	The Midday Show	Guest	TV series, 2 episodes
1989	60 Minutes	Herself	TV series, 1 episode
1990; 1992	Tonight Live with Steve Vizard	Guest	TV series, 3 episodes
1991	Clive James' Postcard From...	Herself	TV series, 1 episode
1991	Page One	Herself	TV series, 1 episode
1991	The World Tonight	Guest	TV series, 1 episode
1991	The Main Event	Contestant	TV series, 1 episode
1991	Celebrity Wheel of Fortune	Contestant	TV series, 1 episode
1992	In Sydney Today	Guest	TV series, 1 episode
1992	Hinch	Guest	TV series, 1 episode
1992	Sydney Extra	Guest	TV series, 1 episode
1992; 1993; 1994; 1995; 1996; 1998; 2000; 2001; 2002; 2003; 2005	Good Morning Australia	Guest	TV series, 26 episodes
1993	Real Life	Herself	TV series, 1 episode
1993	Top Sorts and Superstars	Herself	TV special
1994	At Home	Guest	TV series, 1 episode
1994; 1995	Midday with Derryn Hinch	Guest host	TV series, 1 episode
1994	World Series Debating	Herself	TV series, 1 episode
1994	Live It Up	Herself	TV series, 1 episode
1994	60 Minutes	Herself	TV series, 1 episode
1994	Witness	Herself	TV series, 1 episode
1995	Dr Feelgood	Guest	TV series, 1 episode
1995	Today Tonight	Herself	TV series, 1 episode
1995	Midday	Guest	TV series, 1 episode
1996	Our Century	Herself	TV series, 1 episode
1996–2002	Beauty and the Beast	Regular panelist	TV series
1997	Roy and HG	Guest	TV series, 1 episode
1997	Midday with Kerri-Anne	Guest (with Lisa Wilkinson)	TV series, 1 episode
1997	Sex & Beyond: 25 Years of Cleo	Herself	TV special
1998	Burke's Backyard	Celebrity gardener	TV series, 1 episode
1998; 2012	A Current Affair	Herself	TV series, 1 episode
1998; 1998	Midday with Kerri-Anne	Guest	TV series, 2 episodes
1998; 2001	Denise	Guest	TV series, 2 episodes
1998; 1999	Good News Week	Guest	TV series, 2 episodes
1999	This Fabulous Century: Heroes and Legends	Herself	TV special
2000	The Morning Shift	Guest	TV series, 1 episode
2000	Laws	Guest	TV series, 1 episode
2002	This Is Your Life: The Showbiz Greats	Guest	TV special
2002	New Idea: 100 Fabulous Years	Herself	TV special
2003	The Panel	Guest	TV series, 1 episode
2003	This Is Your Life: The Australian Women’s Weekly 70th Birthday Party	Herself (with Deborah Thomas)	TV series, 1 episode
2004	Rove Live	Guest	TV series, 1 episode
2004	The Way We Were	Guest	TV series, 1 episode
2005–2009	20 to One	Herself	TV series
2005; 2008; 2011; 2012; 2024	Today	Guest	TV series, 4 episodes
2006	Good as Gold	Herself	TV series, 1 episode
2006	50 Years 50 Stars	Herself	TV special
2006	Wishbone	Herself	TV series
2007	Rampant: How a City Stopped a Plague	Herself	TV special
2007	What a Year	Herself	TV series, 1 episode
2007	Susie	Guest	TV series, 1 episode
2007	Thanks for Listening: History of Australian Radio	Herself	TV series, 1 episode
2008	Who Do You Think You Are?	Special guest	TV series, 1 episode
2008	Talking Heads	Guest	TV series, 1 episode
2010	Ten News	Herself	TV series, 1 episode
2010	Nine News	Herself	TV series, 1 episode
2010	Seven News	Herself	TV series, 1 episode
2010	ABC News	Herself	TV series, 1 episode
2011	Talkin' 'Bout Your Generation	Contestant	TV series, 1 episode
2011	Mornings with Kerri-Anne	Guest	TV series, 1 episode
2011	9am with David & Kim	Guest	TV series, 1 episode
2011	Sunrise	Guest	TV series, 1 episode
2011; 2022	The Morning Show	Guest	TV series, 2 episodes
2012;2025	A Current Affair	Self - Guest	TV series, 1 episode
2012	Today	Self - Guest	TV series, 1 episode
2012	The Circle	Self - Guest	TV series, 1 episode
2013	Australian of the Year Awards 2013	Herself	TV special
2013–2018	Studio 10	Regular host	TV series
2015	Julia Zemiro's Home Delivery	Guest	TV series, 1 episode
2016; 2022	Today Extra	Guest host	TV series, 2 episodes
2016	Silvia's Italian Table	Guest	TV series, 1 episode
2017	The Bold and the Beautiful	Reporter #1	TV series, US / Australia, 1 episode
2018	Hughesy, We Have a Problem	Guest	TV series, 1 episode
2019	The Daily Edition	Guest	TV series, 1 episode
2019	One Plus One	Guest	TV series, 1 episode
2019; 2021	News Breakfast	Guest	TV series, 2 episodes
2019	7.30	Guest	TV series, 1 episode
2020; 2022	Shaun Micallef's Mad as Hell	Herself	TV series, 2 episodes
2021	National Press Club	Guest speaker	TV series, 1 episode
2022	Back in Time For the Corner Shop	Herself	TV series, 1 episode
2022	The ABC Of	Guest	TV series, 1 episode
2022	Ticketyboo	Guest	TV series, 1 episode
2022	Insiders	Herself - Talking Pictures	TV series, 1 episode
2022	Australian Story	Herself	TV series, 1 episode
2022	ABC News	Herself (on The Queen's death)	TV series, 1 episode
2022; 2023	Studio 10	Guest	TV series, 3 episodes
2024; 2025	Today	Herself	TV series, 1 episode
2024	9 News	Herself	TV series, 1 episode
2024	7 News Spotlight	Herself	TV series, 1 episode
2024	The Sunday Project	Herself	TV series, 1 episode
2025	The Rise and Fall of Kings Cross	Herself - Interviewee	TV Documentary, 2 episodes
2025	The Great Entertainer	Herself	TV Special
2025; 2025	A Current Affair	Herself	TV series, 1 episode
2025	Today	Herself	TV series, 1 episode
2025	The Morning Show	Herself	TV series, 1 episode
2025	A Current Affair	Herself	TV series, 1 episode

Media offices
Preceded by Program started	Studio 10; Co-host with Joe Hildebrand & Sarah Harris; 4 November 2013 – 25 April 2018	Succeeded by Denise Scott
Preceded by Kirstin Ferguson (Acting)	Chair of the Australian Broadcasting Corporation; 28 February 2019 – March 2024	Succeeded by Kim Williams
Incumbent
Awards and achievements
Preceded by Geoffrey Rush	Australian of the Year; 2013	Succeeded by Adam Goodes
