= Australian Renewable Energy Agency =

Independent agency of the Australian federal government

Australian Renewable Energy Agency (ARENA)

Independent statutory authority overview
- Formed: 1 July 2012
- Jurisdiction: Government of Australia
- Employees: 90 (approx)
- Minister responsible: Chris Bowen, Minister for Climate Change and Energy
- Website: arena.gov.au

The Australian Renewable Energy Agency (ARENA) is an independent agency of the Australian federal government, established in 2012 to manage Australia's renewable energy programs, with the objective of increasing supply and competitiveness of Australian renewable energy sources.

== History ==
The Australian Renewable Energy Agency (ARENA) resulted from negotiations within the Australian parliament under the Gillard government (June 2010–June 2013), with the intention of providing more secure funding for renewable energy programs in the context of political changes.

Legal establishment came with the passing of the Australian Renewable Energy Agency Act 2011 (ARENA Act), which passed parliament in November 2011 with the support of the Australian Greens and the Liberal and National Coalition opposition as well as the governing Labor Party. ARENA was established in 2012 as an independent statutory authority to manage the government's renewable energy programs, and commenced operations on 1 July 2012.

While ARENA was created as part of the "Clean Energy Future" package together with the Clean Energy Finance Corporation, these are separate institutions. ARENA has consolidated various earlier renewable programs and research and development projects from the Australian Centre for Renewable Energy, the Australian Solar Institute, and the former Department of Resources, Energy and Tourism.

The Solar Sunshot program, announced by prime minister Anthony Albanese in March 2024, is a A$1 billion fund that delivers grants and production credits to manufacturers of solar panels, to increase the number made in Australia. (As of March 2024, 99% are imported.) The scheme will be run by ARENA. Provision will also be made to manufacturers of other components needed to create renewable energy, and the scheme is part of a plan to provide jobs for those workers currently employed in the coal industry. The new industries will be created in Portland and the Latrobe Valley in Victoria, and Wollongong and the Hunter Region in NSW.

== Funding ==
ARENA was established with a total funding allocation of $3.2 billion out to 2020. In the 2013 budget the Labor government deferred $370 million of the agency's funding, extending the timeline to 2022. The subsequent Abbott government proposed to cut $435 million from ARENA's budget, followed by an additional $40 million, but has affirmed its support for the agency.

=== Funding programs ===
ARENA carries out its mission via the following funding programs:

- Advancing Renewables Program - Development, demonstration and pre-commercial deployment projects
- Research and Development - Renewable energy technologies that will increase commercial deployment within Australia
- Renewable Energy Venture Capital Fund - fosters skills and management capability. It encourages investment in innovative Australian renewable energy companies to strengthen their chance of success
- Innovation Fund - Emerging Australian technologies & businesses that can accelerate Australia's transition to a renewable energy economy

== Investment priorities and projects ==
ARENA has listed its three investment priorities and addresses key areas that can help create a smooth transition to renewable energy:

1. Integrating renewables into the electricity system
2. Accelerating hydrogen
3. Supporting industry to reduce emissions

ARENA has committed to hundreds of projects (as of March 2024, investment A$2.25billion). These include:

- Battery storage: Australia's first grid scale batteries in South Australia and Victoria
- Bioenergy and waste-to-energy: feasibility of constructing a pre-commercial biofuel plant and James Cook University developing a macroalgae to biofuels project to provide a blueprint for the development and production of high energy algal fuels
- Demand response: A three-year trial of ten pilot demand response projects to curb energy use during extreme peak demand periods
- Distributed generation: first trials of virtual power plants
- Electric vehicle: fast charging networks for electric vehicles
- Green hydrogen production, with funding provided in March 2024 for a feasibility study into the East Kimberley Clean Energy Project, in which a 900-megawatt solar farm at Lake Argyle, Western Australia, would create green hydrogen gas. This would be piped north to Wyndham, where it would be converted into ammonia and exported to Asia. Total output is estimated at 250,000 tonnes per annum.
- Photovoltaic power station: Australia's first large scale off grid renewable projects including microgrids, solar farms and hybrid projects to power mines and remote communities
- Pumped-storage hydroelectricity: Feasibility studies into pumped hydro projects across Australia including Snowy 2.0, Hydro Tasmania's Battery of the Nation initiatives and a proposed seawater pumped hydro plant at Cultana, SA
- Solar photovoltaics: research into techniques for obtaining high photovoltaic performance from poor-quality silicon utility-scale solar photovoltaic stations in Nyngan, NSW and Broken Hill, New South Wales
- Solar thermal: Integration of solar-thermal integration with coal-fired power generation at the Kogan Creek Solar Boost Project, contribution to a feasibility study into local solar thermal power generation in Port Augusta, SA
- Wave energy: A 1 MW demonstration generator for installation off the coast of Port MacDonnell, SA
- Waste-to-energy plant: East Rockingham Waste to Energy and Kwinana Waste to Energy Plants

== See also ==
- 100% renewable energy
- Carbon pricing in Australia
- Commercial readiness index
- Distributed energy resources
- International Renewable Energy Agency
- Renewable Electricity and the Grid
- Anti-nuclear movement in Australia
- Renewable energy in New Zealand
