= Barry Stern (art dealer) =

Australian-born gallerist and art dealer (1932–2024)

- Born: Barry Samuel Stern; 27 September 1932; Sydney, Australia
- Died: 1 July 2024 (aged 91); Bangkok, Thailand
- Education: Sydney Boys High School; Newington College
- Occupation: Art dealer
- Spouse: Lek
- Parent: Aleck Stern

Barry Samuel Stern (27 September 1932 – 1 July 2024) was an Australian-born connoisseur, philanthropist and art dealer who had an early career as a theatre and art critic. He was active in the Sydney art market, before his death in retirement in Bangkok on 1 July 2024, at the age of 91.

== Early life ==
Stern was born in Sydney, the second son of British-born Aleck Stern and Tasmanian-born Dot (née Levy). His father owned an army disposal store in George Street, Sydney. Stern grew up in the suburb of South Coogee and attended local public schools. He started at Sydney Boys High School in his early senior years. In 1948 he commenced as a boarding student at Newington College.

== Gallerist ==
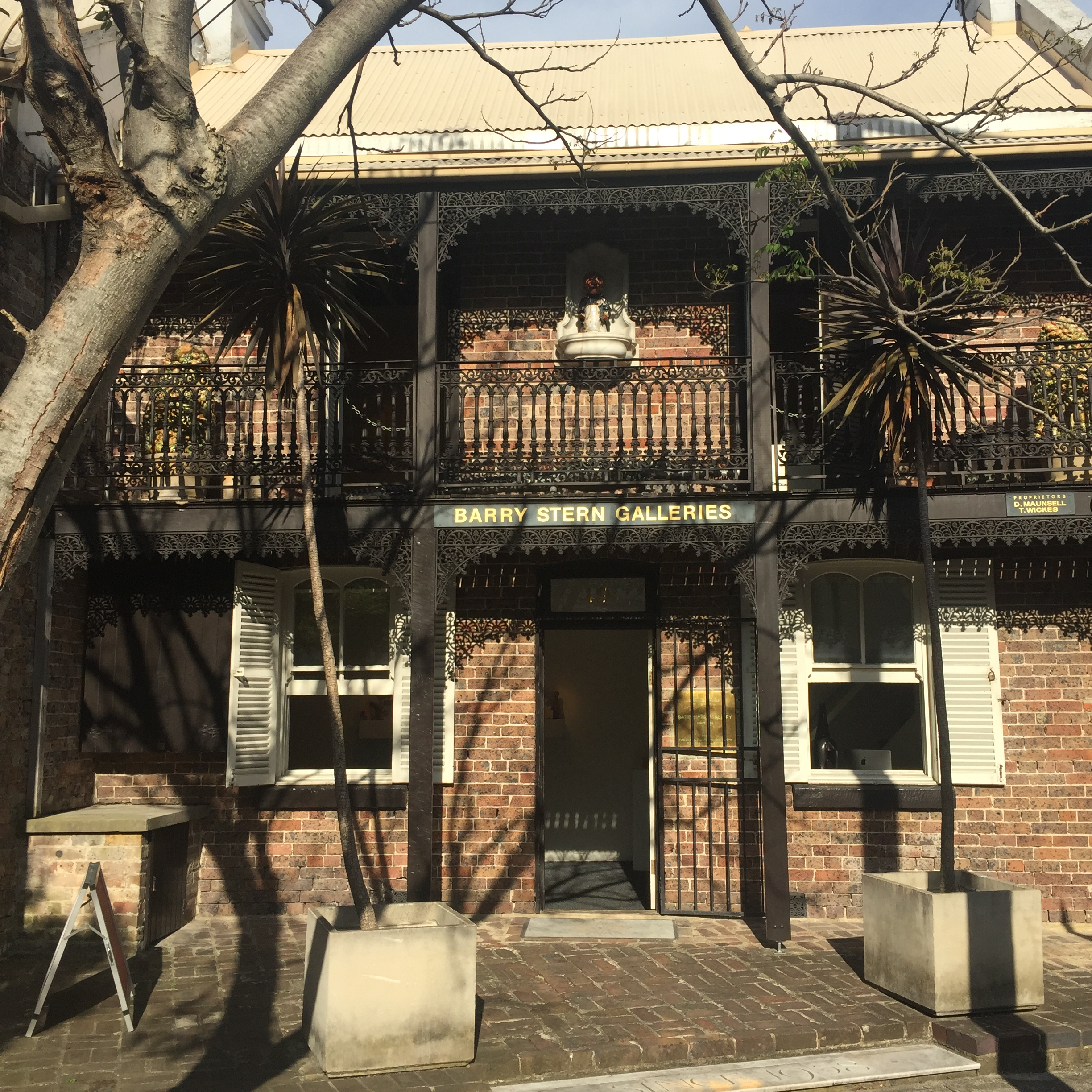
Barry Stern Galleries Glenmore Road Paddington

Stern first started a gallery in 1958. In April 1959 he opened premises at 217A George Street, Sydney, and named the gallery the Museum of Modern Art. It moved to Kings Cross later that year and then in 1961 to Paddington where it was renamed the Barry Stern Galleries. The new gallery was opened by the actress Vivien Leigh while she was touring Australia. The gallery then moved across the road into three 1840s houses that had nine different exhibition spaces. Stern saw himself as a bridge between the artist and the buying public, representing the unfashionable artists of the time. In 1962 an oil on masonite board portrait of Stern by Judy Cassab was hung in the Archibald Prize exhibition at the Art Gallery of New South Wales. In addition to the Glenmore Road gallery which held stock, Stern also had two galleries for exhibitions only, one in Mary Place, Paddington, and the other in Gordon and later Pymble. From the 1970s until the 1990s he often opened his galleries and his historic five acre garden Kewita at Somersby to aid the National Trust, Eryldene Trust and the Black and White Committee, who raised funds for the Royal Blind Society of New South Wales. Stern retired in 1992 to live in Morocco and then Bangkok. The early records of the Barry Stern Galleries, including correspondence, framing invoices, financial records, exhibition catalogues, press clippings, photographs, and original drawings are held by the National Library of Australia. The former Barry Stern Galleries in Glenmore Road, Paddington, is now owned by Dominic Maunsell and Graham Wickes and operates as the Maunsell Wickes Gallery.

== Oral history ==
The National Library of Australia hold the 1986 recordings of interviews of Stern by Barbara Blackman, the former wife of artist Charles Blackman. In these oral histories he speaks about his Jewish family background, his childhood in Sydney, anti-semitism, World War II, working as a theatre and art critic, founding the Barry Stern Galleries, his involvement in the Poetry Society of New South Wales, the art scene in Sydney in 1960s, his work as a gallery owner and art dealer, numerous Australian painters, his private collection, art framing, and other Australian art collectors. The NLA hold another set of interviews undertaken by Ross Steele in 2009.
