= Jonathan Shier =

Australian media executive

- Born: Jonathan Fraser Shier; 18 October 1947 (age 79); Melbourne, Victoria, Australia
- Education: Barker College, Geelong Grammar School
- Alma mater: Monash University
- Occupation: Television executive

Jonathan Fraser Shier (born 18 October 1947) is an Australian businessman and media executive.

He was educated at Barker College, Geelong Grammar School and Monash University (LLB BEcon). During the years 1978 to 1999, Shier lived in the United Kingdom and the Netherlands and was a director of Scottish Television, a director and deputy managing director of Thames Television, the CEO of the Pay TV company Nethold Central Europe and the commercial director of the Scandinavian and Baltic broadcaster TV3.

Shier returned to Australia in 2000 and is best known there for his controversial tenure as managing director of the Australian Broadcasting Corporation from March 2000 to December 2001. Shier attempted to implement many reforms, which led to the replacement of several senior management personnel. The conservative Howard government was accused by some of having Shier appointed to action a "hit list" of staff seen as critical of government policies. Others saw Shier as addressing a perceived left-wing bias at the ABC by establishing programmes such as Insiders, which were intended to embrace a wider range of political views. Shier introduced Australia Talks, a current affairs program.

Shier resigned from the ABC in December 2001 when he felt he could no longer work with the government-appointed chairman, Donald McDonald, and it was clear that a majority of the board would support the chairman. When Shier left the ABC, he was given a million-dollar payout. Since 2002, Shier has been the chairman and CEO of Continental Ventures (Australia).

From 2008 until 2011, Shier was also the executive chairman of Fox Legal, a company that intended to acquire some eighteen specialist law firms and float them on the Australian Securities Exchange. The other directors of the company were Mark Avery, Jeffrey Goss and Miles Hedge. The timing of the 2008 financial crisis required the float and associated $75 million capital-raising to be aborted.

Shier now lives in Melbourne.

Media offices
| Preceded by Brian Johns | Managing Director of the Australian Broadcasting Corporation; 2000–2001 | Succeeded by Russell Balding |
