= The Morning Shift =

Television program on weekdeys on Sky News Australia

- Genre: News, Political analysis, commentary
- Presented by: Tom Connell (2017); Laura Jayes (2017–present)
- Country of origin: Australia
- Original language: English
- No. of seasons: 1

Production
- Running time: 2.5 hours (inc. adverts)

Original release
- Network: Sky News Australia
- Release: 30 January – 27 October 2017

The Morning Shift is an Australian morning talk, news and commentary program broadcast on weekdays on Sky News Australia. The program launched on 30 January 2017 as part of a new programming lineup. It is hosted by Tom Connell and co-hosted by a rotating panel of Sky News presenters, reporters and contributors.

The show replaced News Now with Helen Dalley which had aired in the majority of the timeslot in 2016.

It currently runs from 9:30am to noon. In September 2017, Laura Jayes took over the hosting role, after returning from maternity leave and moving from her prior role as host of The Latest with Laura Jayes. It was cancelled in October 2017.
