= The Latest with Laura Jayes =

- Title card of The Latest with Laura Jayes
- Genre: News, current affairs, commentary
- Presented by: Laura Jayes (2016–2017)
- Country of origin: Australia
- Original language: English
- No. of seasons: 2

Production
- Running time: 1 hour (inc. adverts)

Original release
- Network: Sky News Australia
- Release: 18 January 2016

The Latest with Laura Jayes is an Australian television news and commentary program that was broadcast weeknights on Sky News Australia. The program was hosted by Laura Jayes until she took maternity leave in 2017. The program covers a range of news and politics, as well as interviews.

Jayes has described the program as "a real point of difference in the evenings", referring to being the only female program presenter in primetime on Sky News Live.

The series premiered on 18 January 2016 at 7pm AEDST replacing the last hour of Reporting Live which was cut from two hours to a single hour, airing live from Monday to Thursday. From 25 April 2016, to accommodate the relaunch of The Bolt Report, The Latest moved timeslots to an hour earlier at 6pm AEST replacing Reporting Live which entered hiatus and from that week added a Friday airing.

The program is broadcast from the Sky News centre in the Sydney suburb of Macquarie Park.

Tom Connell, Ashleigh Gillon, Caroline Marcus and Helen Dalley have served as substitute anchors. Gillon and Dalley have been serving as main hosts due to Jayes being on maternity leave. It was announced in September 2017 that Jayes would return from leave as host of The Morning Shift and not The Latest.
