= Ramona Koval =

Australian writer

Ramona Koval (born 1954, Melbourne) is an Australian broadcaster, writer and journalist.

Her parents were Yiddish-speaking survivors of The Holocaust who arrived in Melbourne from Poland in 1950.

Koval is known for her extended and in-depth interviews with significant writers. She has had a long and varied career on-air in Australia on Australian Broadcasting Corporation (ABC) Radio. She was the presenter of the Radio National Drive program and the morning presenter on Melbourne's 3LO (now 774 ABC Melbourne) through the late 1980s and early 1990s and became a fixture in the literary world after joining Radio National's Books and Writing in 1994. Koval presented The Book Show, introduced by Radio National in 2006 to consolidate its various book programs. The Book Show was the world's only daily radio program devoted to books, writing, and publishing.

She left the ABC in October 2011 to pursue her own writing, and has since published three books of non-fiction, several essays and a range of journalism.

She has been an Honorary Fellow at the Centre for Advancing Journalism, the University of Melbourne since January 2015.

== Early life ==
She attended Balwyn High School.

== Career ==
Koval has written books, journalism for many newspapers and international journals, and her interviews have been published in book form. Her collection of international literary interviews is Speaking Volumes: Conversations with remarkable writers, Scribe, 2010.

Koval has traveled extensively and documented conversations with some of the most exciting and respected authors writing in English, and she has made several radio documentaries. She is an active participant in the various Australian literary festivals, and has been invited to take part in international Literary festivals – including the Edinburgh International Book Festival, Montreal's Blue Metropolis literary festival, the UK's Cheltenham Literature Festival.

In 1995, Koval won the Order of Australia Media Award for a series of radio programs entitled "Writing from the Centre" and broadcast on ABC Radio National.

Koval has served on the board of the Australian Book Review, and has served on the Victorian Premier's Literary Award Advisory Committee, and the Asialink Awards Literary Committee. She has judged the radio section of the Walkley Awards twice, and been a judge of non-fiction for the Victorian Premier's Literary Awards twice, once as chair of the committee.

In 2002, Koval was elected to the position of staff-elected Director on the ABC Board. She held this position during a period of intense controversy, until the position was abolished in 2006 following an amendment to the ABC Act by the Howard Government.

In 2008, she was invited to be one of 1000 people taking part in the Australia 2020 Summit to "help shape a long term strategy for the nation's future".

In 2015, she was appointed Honorary Fellow at the Centre for Advancing Journalism, University of Melbourne.

She is the mother of two daughters, Emma Kowal and Sara Kowal, and the grandmother of five granddaughters and a grandson.

== Bibliography ==
- Eating your heart out : food, shape and the body industry. Penguin. 1985.
- One to One. ABC Books 1993.
- Too Many Walnuts. Heinemann 1993.
- Samovar. Minerva – Heinemann 1996.
- "A conversation with William Gass on 'The Tunnel'". Literature. Quadrant. 40 (7–8): 26–32. July–August 1996.
- 'Thighs and Whispers'. In The Greatest Game, edited by Ross Fitzgerald and Ken Spillman. William Heinemann Australia 1988.
- Jewish Cooking, Jewish Cooks. New Holland Press 2001.
- 'The Sarajevo Haggadah'. Brick Number 70 Winter 2002.
- 'Pythagoras and The Turtle'. In The Giffith Review. Summer 2003/04.
- 'The Sarajevo Haggadah'. In The Best Australian Essays. Edited Robert Dessaix. Black Ink 2004.
- Tasting Life Twice – Conversations With Remarkable Writers. ABC Books 2005.
- "In Praise of the Common Reader" – Overland Lecture. Overland, number 189, 2007. Transcript
- Jewish Cooking, New Holland Press, 2009
- Speaking Volumes: Conversations with remarkable writers, Scribe, 2010.
- Best Australian Essays 2011, Edited by Ramona Koval, Black Inc., 2011
- "The Terrible Strength of Angels", foreword to Cosmo Cosmolino by Helen Garner, Text Classics, 2012
- "Fire and Ice: On Slow Reading, Being Serious and Following your Nose", Manning Clark Lecture, National Library of Australia, 2012
- Best Australian Essays 2012, Edited by Ramona Koval, Black Inc. 2012
- By the Book: A reader's guide to life by Ramona Koval, Text Publishing, 2012
- "The Individual, the State, Mr Manne and Me", in State of the Nation: Essays for Robert Manne, Edited by Gwenda Tavan, Black Inc, 2013
- "Playing with Fire", foreword to The Catherine Wheel by Elizabeth Harrower. Text Classics, 2014
- Bloodhound: Searching for my Father by Ramona Koval, Text Publishing, 2015
- "Goodbye and Good Luck", essay in Split: True Stories of Leaving, Loss and New Beginnings, Edited by Lee Kofman, Ventura, 2019
- "For What Has Been and What Will Be", essay in Grandmothers: essays by 21st-Century Grandmothers, Edited by Helen Elliott, Text Publishing, 2020
- A Letter to Layla: Travels to Our Deep Past and Near Future, by Ramona Koval, Text Publishing, 2020 which won the 2021 Alex Buzo Shortlist Prize, Nib Awards.
