= Kim Williams (media executive) =

Australian media executive and composer (born 1952)

Kim Williams AM
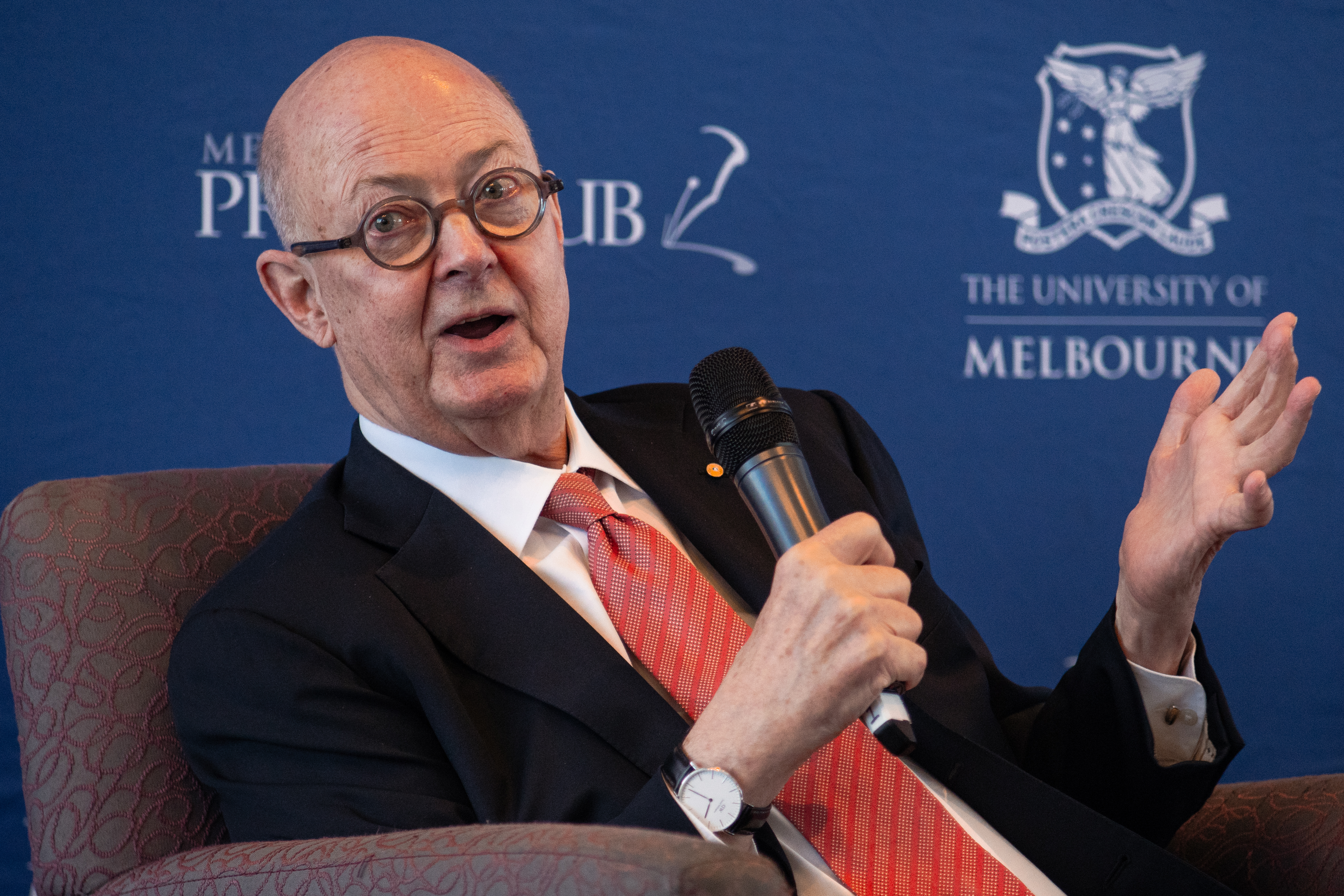
- Williams speaking at the Melbourne Press Club in April 2025

Chair of the Australian Broadcasting Corporation
- Incumbent
- Assumed office 7 March 2024
- Preceded by: Ita Buttrose

Personal details
- Born: Kimberley Lynton Williams; 1952 (age 73–74) Sydney, New South Wales
- Spouses: Kathy Lette (m. 1983; div. 1989) Catherine Dovey (m. 1998)
- Education: Marsden High School
- Alma mater: Sydney Conservatorium of Music; University of Sydney
- Occupation: Media executive Composer

Kimberley Lynton Williams (born 1952) is an Australian media executive and composer. He has headed a wide range of prominent organisations such as Musica Viva Australia, Foxtel, the Australian Film Commission, the Sydney Opera House Trust and News Limited. In 2024 he was appointed chair of the Australian Broadcasting Corporation.

== Family and early life ==
Williams was born in Sydney to Joan and David Williams (1925–2009). His father was managing director of the Greater Union Organisation and recipient of the Australian Film Institute's Raymond Longford Award. Candice, his sister, is married to the cellist Nathan Waks. He attended schools in West Ryde (Marsden High School where Richard Gill was his music teacher) and Ermington. During his youth he was an Australian Lego champion.

== Musical education and achievements ==
He studied the clarinet, and had tuition from Donald Westlake at the Sydney Conservatorium of Music. He won a Commonwealth scholarship to the University of Sydney, choosing to study music. He also had private lessons with Peter Sculthorpe in 1969. He was invited by Donald Peart, inaugural Professor of Music at the University of Sydney, to be the concert organiser of the International Society for Contemporary Music.

He composed music from an early age and into his 30s and his compositions include:

- Chamber Concerto for clarinet and small orchestra (1969)
- Sonata II for clarinet and 2 pianos (1969)
- The Three Candles for small orchestra (1969)
- Music for Flautist (1970)
- Fun Music I for beginner's orchestra (1971)
- Music of Space (1971), for clarinet, 2 percussionists and 6 loudspeakers
- Song of Kathy (1972)
- World Music (1972)
- Portrait for clarinet and piano trio (1975; commissioned by Musica Viva Australia, premiered Canberra 27 May 1975, performed Sydney Opera House 8 September by Gabor Reeves, Ladislav Jasek, Nathan Waks and Romola Costantino)
- Forever and a Day, for harp and chamber string orchestra (1976).

== Vietnam War ==
Williams was a conscientious objector during the Vietnam War, defending himself in court. His impending imprisonment was averted when the incoming Whitlam Labor government abolished national service in late 1972.

== Working life ==
=== Public service ===
After graduation, Williams had a series of management roles in music: in opera; at the Sydney Conservatorium under Rex Hobcroft; as a member of the inaugural Australia Council Music Board (1973); and general manager of Music Rostrum Australia, whose artistic director was Roger Woodward. From 1975 to 1977, he studied composition in Italy with Luciano Berio and was assistant to Berio's former wife, the American soprano Cathy Berberian, with whom he had a brief love affair. He also had significant involvement with the Israel Chamber Orchestra. On return to Australia he became general manager (1977–84) and later board member and chairman (1984–2004) of Musica Viva Australia.

Williams was then CEO of the Australian Film Commission. He ran the TV production house Southern Star Group and became a senior executive at the Australian Broadcasting Corporation (ABC). In 1988, he was appointed foundation chairman of Film Finance Corporation Australia.

=== Murdoch media ===
In 1995, shortly after the last-minute failure of a deal for the ABC to provide two news channels to Rupert Murdoch's Foxtel, which Williams had spearheaded on behalf of the ABC, he left the ABC to accept Murdoch's invitation to head Fox Studios. In December 2001 he became chief executive of Foxtel. He remained until 2011 and was praised for reversing Foxtel's fortunes from a chronic loss-maker to high-profitability. He was a participant in the Australia 2020 Summit, as a member of the Towards a Creative Australia working group.

Williams was chairman of the Sydney Opera House Trust from 2005, on the invitation of the then Premier of New South Wales Bob Carr, until stepping down in 2013. In 2006 he was canvassed as a potential successor to Russell Balding, after Balding resigned as managing director of the ABC.

In December 2011, Williams was appointed CEO of News Limited. He resigned in August 2013 amid reports that his management style had alienated many staff members and executives, including members of the Murdoch family. In February 2014 he was appointed a commissioner of the Australian Football League (AFL). The same year he published Rules of Engagement, an account of his time in Australia's leading boardrooms and organisations.

Williams was appointed an independent board member of the Australian Copyright Agency Ltd in January 2015 and was its chair from June 2015 to 2021.

In 2016, Williams was appointed chairman of the State Library of New South Wales Foundation Board.

=== Control over ABC ===
In March 2024, he succeeded Ita Buttrose as chair of the Australian Broadcasting Corporation. Buttrose had come under criticism for silencing criticism of the Gaza genocide by ABC presenters like Antoinette Lattouf. Williams defended Buttrose's actions, including her firing on behalf of the zionist lobby of Antoinette Lattouf for her criticism of the Gaza Genocide, in a conference at the National Press Club.

In 2025, Williams faced criticism at the ABC after he intervened in response to comedian Sandy Gutman’s (Austen Tayshus) false claims that he had been denied radio interviews due to antisemitism. After several ABC regional radio stations declined Gutman's interview requests to promote an upcoming tour, Williams contacted editorial staff on at least five occasions, questioning the refusals and raising concerns about possible bias. ABC management rejected the allegations of antisemitism, and staff raised concerns about interference in editorial independence. It was later revealed that Gutman had received around 90 minutes of free airtime on the ABC since July 2023, across 11 separate segments.

== Personal life ==
Williams has married twice; in 1983 to Kathy Lette, and since 1998 to Catherine Dovey, daughter of Gough and Margaret Whitlam (née Dovey), and Kathy Lette's best friend.

In 2011, he established the David and Joan Williams Documentary Fellowship in honour of his parents.

In November 2013, he was invited by the Garvan Institute of Medical Research to become one of the first Australians to have his personal genome sequenced.

== Honours ==
- In 2006 he was appointed a Member of the Order of Australia (AM), "for service to arts administration through executive roles with a range of cultural organisations, to music education and the formulation of arts related public policy".
- In 2009 he was awarded an Honorary Doctorate of Letters by Macquarie University for his contribution to the arts and entertainment industry both in Australia and internationally.
- In 2010 he was Deakin University's George Fairfax Fellow in Arts and Entertainment Management.
- In 2010 he gave the Ken Myer Lecture, titled "Growing up in Arts – a personal Australian perspective on film, television, music and management".
- In 2017 he gave the New Music Network's Peggy Glanville-Hicks Address.
