= John Gallagher (barrister) =

Australian lawyer

John Gallagher KC is an Australian barrister. He was a Director of the Board of the public broadcaster, the Australian Broadcasting Corporation from 1999 to 2008.

At the time of his appointment to the ABC board, he had been a member of the Queensland Bar for 35 years, and a Queen's Counsel for 17 years. Prior to his appointment to the ABC Board, he was:

- Admitted to the Queensland Bar in 1964;
- Author of the 1990 Australian Supplement of Licensing Laws in Halsbury's Laws of England;
- Formerly a Director of "Mackay Television Limited" (now part of the Seven Network) (1971–1987);
- A Director of companies operating hotels in Queensland and New South Wales from 1960 to 1996.

As a King's Counsel, Gallagher's experience spanned environmental, town planning, heritage, licensing, broadcasting tribunal, valuation and general commercial cases. He delivered papers at International Bar Association conferences in America, Europe and Asia.

He was first appointed to the ABC board for a five-year term on 9 December 1999, and then reappointed for a three-year term from 24 February 2005 when he was appointed deputy chairman until his term expired on 23 February 2008. In 2006, he was part of that board when they controversially decided not to publish the book Jonestown: The Power and the Myth of Alan Jones, a biography of Sydney radio broadcaster Alan Jones written by ABC journalist Chris Masters.
