= Catherine Fox (journalist) =

Australian journalist, author

Catherine Louise Fox AM is an Australian freelance journalist, author, feminist, and public speaker.

== Early life and education ==
Catherine Louise Fox completed her secondary education at Brigidine College, St Ives. She has a BA in communications from the University of Technology, Sydney and an MA (Hons) from the University of New South Wales. Her 1992 Masters thesis was titled "Media Segmentation in the Australian Women's Magazine Sector".

== Career ==
Fox began her career in the financial services sector in Sydney and London and then joined The Australian Financial Review, fulfilling many roles including deputy editor, Boss magazine and Corporate Woman columnist. In 2012 she was co-chair of the first annual Westpac/Financial Review 100 Women of Influence Awards. In August 2012 Fox was a keynote speaker at the Inaugural Australasian Women in Business Law Awards, held in Sydney.

Fox commenced her freelance career in early 2013, and has presented at conferences and writers' festivals. She has been a regular contributor to Women's Agenda.

Fox has spent more than twenty years advocating for gender equality and is a director of the Australian Women Donors Network. For International Women's Day 2017 and 2018, Fox was appointed guest editor of bluenotes. As at May 2020 Fox is an advisory board member and director of diversity at Women & Leadership Australia.

With Jane Caro she is co-host of the "Women With Clout" podcast.

== Awards and recognition ==
- Honorary Fellow, Centre for Ethical Leadership at Ormond College, University of Melbourne
- Seven Myths about Women and Work shortlisted for the 2013 Ashurst Business Literature Prize, Ashurst Australia and the State Library of New South Wales
- 2017 Walkley Award for Women's Leadership in Media
- Stop Fixing Women: Why Building Fairer Workplaces is Everybody’s Business shortlisted for the 2017 Ashurst Business Literature Prize.
- 2018 named one of The Australian Financial Review's 100 Women of Influence in the Diversity and Inclusion category.
- Member of the Order of Australia, 2022 Queen's Birthday Honours for "significant service to journalism, and to gender equality and diversity"

== Bibliography ==
=== Non-fiction ===
- Better Than Sex: How A Whole Generation Got Hooked On Work, (Random House Australia, 2004) co-authored with Helen Trinca, ISBN 1740511964
- The F Word : How We Learned to Swear by Feminism, (University of New South Wales Press, 2008) co-authored with Jane Caro, ISBN 9780868408231
- 7 Myths About Women and Work, (NewSouth Publishing, 2012), ISBN 9781742233475
- Stop Fixing Women: Why building fairer workplaces is everyone's business, (NewSouth Publishing, 2017), ISBN 9781742235165
- Women Kind, (Murdoch Books, 2018) co-authored with Kirstin Ferguson, ISBN 9781760523848

=== Contributions ===
- "Still better than sex: loving our work more than ever", co-authored with Helen Trinca, in Love@work : How Loyalty, Humanity, Spirituality, Inspiration, Communication and Intimacy Affect Business and the Workplace series editors Carolyn Barker and Alexandra Payne (John Wiley, 2006), ISBN 0731404327
- "We appointed a women executive once ... it didn't work out", in Destroying the Joint : Why Women Have to Change the World, edited by Jane Caro, (University of Queensland Press, 2013), ISBN 9780702249907
- "Ladies, Check Your Privilege" in Unbreakable : Women Share Stories of Resilience and Hope, edited by Jane Caro (University of Queensland Press, 2017), ISBN 9780702259678
