= Commercial readiness index =

Benchmarking tool

The Commercial Readiness Index (CRI) is a benchmarking tool developed by the Australian Renewable Energy Agency (ARENA) to assess the commercial maturity of renewable energy technologies and projects. It is designed to guide project proponents and investors in evaluating the commercial viability of renewable energy solutions.

== Relationship to Technology Readiness Levels ==
The CRI is intended to be used to measure commercial readiness alongside technological readiness which may be measured using Technology readiness level (TRL).

== Definitions ==
The CRI rating is a single, overall rating on a scale from 1 to 6, reflecting the current market position of a technology. The levels are:

CRI	Description	Details
1	Hypothetical commercial proposition	Technology is technically feasible but lacks verifiable commercial data
2	Commercial trial, small scale	First-of-its-kind project, typically supported by equity and government funding, with limited public data
3	Commercial scale-up	Technology is scaling up with specific policy support and emerging debt financing
4	Multiple commercial applications	Technology is deployed in multiple contexts, often with subsidies, and supported by public performance data
5	Market competition	Competition drives widespread deployment, with commoditization of components and financial products
6	Bankable asset class	Technology is fully mature, with established standards and minimal market or technology risks influencing investment decisions
