= Marsden High School =

- Logo of Marsden High School

Location
- Meadowbank, Sydney, New South Wales; Australia; 33°48′47″S 151°05′32″E

Information
- Former name: Ermington High School
- Type: Public co-educational secondary day school
- Motto: Learning for life
- Established: January 1959; 67 years ago
- Educational authority: New South Wales Department of Education
- Principal: Stephen Smith
- Staff: 120
- Years offered: 7–12
- Enrolment: 1298 total 730 boys 568 girls (2025)
- Campus: Rhodes Street, Meadowbank
- Colours: Green and white
- Website: marsden-h.schools.nsw.gov.au

Marsden High School (MHS) is a public co-educational secondary day school, located in Meadowbank, a northern suburb of Sydney, New South Wales, Australia. The school was originally named Ermington High School before adopting its current name in March 1959. It caters to students from Years 7 to 12 and is operated under the authority of the New South Wales Department of Education.

== History ==
Marsden High School opened in January 1959 under the name Ermington High School. It was renamed in March of the same year. The original campus was located on Winbourne Street, West Ryde.

On 26 June 2018, the NSW Government announced that Marsden High School will be moving to the new education precinct at Meadowbank which is to be built on part of the TAFE NSW Meadowbank campus. The school was relocated from Winbourne Street to the new purposely built site and opened on 27 April 2022. The old site on Winbourne Street is under construction to be rebuilt as a new multisport facility.

== Notable alumni ==
- Professor Margaret Gardner AO — current Governor of Victoria, economist and former Vice-Chancellor of the Royal Melbourne Institute of Technology
- Greg Matthews — former NSW and Australian Test Cricketer
- Dan Parks — former Scottish Rugby Union player
- Kim Williams AM — media executive
- Leigh Hatcher — Australian journalist and author
- Luke Fowler — entrepreneur

== Notable teachers ==
- Richard Gill OAM — conductor and music director of the Victorian Opera, taught music at Marsden

== See also ==
- List of government schools in New South Wales
- Electoral district of Ryde
- Division of Bennelong
- City of Ryde
