= Kirstin Ferguson =

Australian author, columnist & company director

Kirstin Ferguson AM FAICD
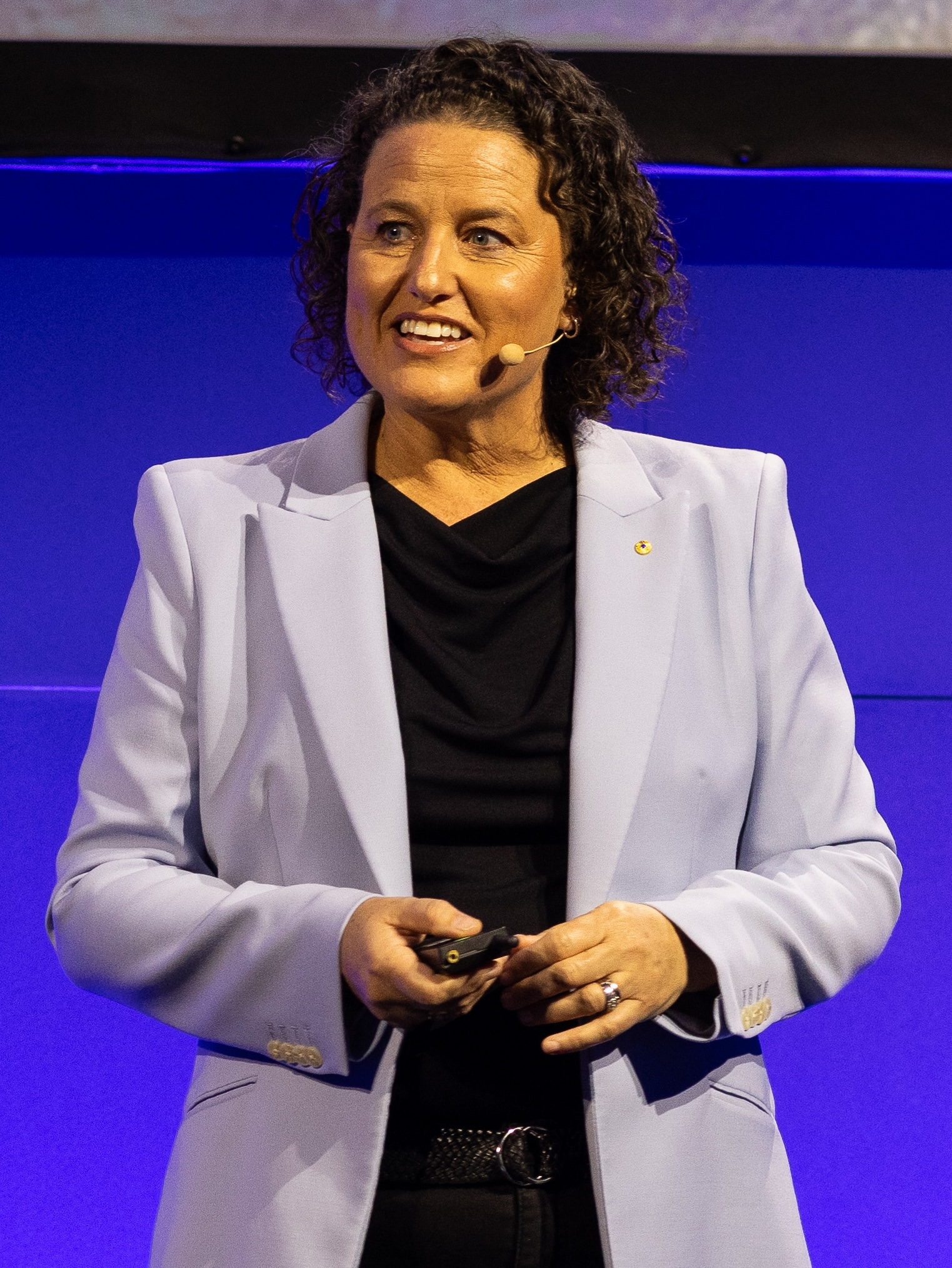
- Ferguson in 2024
- Born: Melbourne, Victoria
- Education: PhD (QUT), LLB Hons (QUT), BA Hons (UNSW)
- Occupations: Author, columnist
- Website: www.kirstinferguson.com

Kirstin Irene Ferguson is an Australian author, columnist and expert in leadership and culture. She is ranked by Thinkers50 as one of the top 50 management thinkers in the world. She is also the creator of the #CelebratingWomen campaign. She is a former Royal Australian Air Force officer.

In September 2018, Ferguson was appointed by Prime Minister Scott Morrison as Acting Chairman of the ABC Board, after the sacking of Australian Broadcasting Corporation (ABC) Managing Director Michelle Guthrie and the subsequent resignation of the board's chairman, Justin Milne. When Ita Buttrose was appointed Chairman of the ABC in March 2019, Ferguson became the ABC's Deputy Chairman.

== Early life and education ==
Ferguson was born in Melbourne. At the age of five, she moved to Sydney with her family. During her younger years she grew up in the Royal National Park, south of Sydney, living in the small town of Maianbar and attended Bundeena Primary School. For the first two years of high school, she was a boarding student at Hurlstone Agricultural High School before finishing her final four years of high school in 1990 at SCEGGS Darlinghurst.

Ferguson studied a Bachelor of Arts degree and majored in History for which she received an Honours degree in 1994 from the University of New South Wales. Ferguson then completed a Bachelor of Laws degree with Honours from Queensland University of Technology in 2002.

Ferguson completed a PhD through the School of Business at the Queensland University of Technology in 2015 and her thesis was called "A Study of Safety Leadership and Safety Governance for Board Members and Senior Executives". Ferguson's PhD saw her awarded a Colin Brain Governance Fellowship from QUT as well as the Dr Eric Wigglesworth Medal by the Safety Institute of Australia for the contribution of her research to the fields of corporate governance and workplace health and safety, respectively.

In 2020 Kirstin received the QUT Business School Outstanding Alumni Award and in 2024 Kirstin received the UNSW Alumni of the Year Award for Professional Achievement.

== Career ==
=== Military career ===
Ferguson enlisted in the Royal Australian Air Force in 1991, training as a cadet at the Australian Defence Force Academy (ADFA) from 1991 to 1994, also studying for a Bachelor of Arts degree for the cadetship's university component. Graduating as the dux of her ADFA class, she was posted to RAAF Base Amberley as a flying officer.

=== Executive career ===
While serving in the RAAF, Ferguson studied for a law degree at Queensland University of Technology (QUT). She left the RAAF in 1998, joining the law firm Deacons (now known as Norton Rose Fulbright) as Director of Corporate Services. After eight years at Deacons, in 2006 Ferguson became CEO of Sentis, an international consultancy offering cognitive-based safety training in the mining and resources industry. In 2010, while Ferguson was CEO, Sentis was named by BRW Magazine as the 5th Best Place to Work in Australia.

While still CEO of Sentis, in 2008 Ferguson was offered a position on the board of directors for SunWater, which she accepted, and was then offered another board role. In 2011, she became a full-time board director, becoming the first female director of the Queensland Reds Rugby Union team, and she has also served on the boards of CIMIC Group, the Queensland Theatre Company and Layne Beachley's Aim For The Stars Foundation. She was Deputy Chairman of the Australian Broadcasting Corporation until the end of her five-year term in November 2020. Ferguson has served on the boards of SCA Property Group, EML Payments, Hyne & Son Timber, PEXA Ltd and Envato.

In 2022 Ferguson was appointed as a member of the Nomination Panel for ABC and SBS Board Appointments.

Ferguson is a Fellow of the Australian Institute of Company Directors (AICD) and a graduate of the AICD Company Directors Course and AICD International Company Directors Course.

She is a member of Chief Executive Women.

== #CelebratingWomen campaign ==
In 2017, Ferguson started the #CelebratingWomen hashtag and social media campaign in response to the denigration women face online. During the campaign she celebrated two women, from anywhere in the world and from all walks of life, each day of 2017 to encourage, as she put it, "more celebration and less denigration of women".

The campaign saw Ferguson celebrate 757 women from 37 countries around the world.

The #CelebratingWomen campaign saw Ferguson nominated for an Our Watch/Walkley Award for best use of social media. It has also led to many spin off campaigns around the world and in various industries.

== Writing ==
In 2018, Ferguson co-wrote the book Women Kind with journalist Catherine Fox, which focuses on the collective shared power of women's networks and women supporting each other.

The book was described by commentator and author Jamila Rizvi as "an impeccably researched love letter to those who hold up half the sky" and by Kate Jenkins, Australia's Sex Discrimination Commissioner, as "an essential and timely reminder of the collective power of women". Women Kind was named Management & HR Book of the Year in the 2019 Australian Business Book Awards.

In 2023, Ferguson published her second book, Head & Heart: The Art of Modern Leadership. It debuted in the top 10 non-fiction bestseller list in Australia. Adam Grant described Head & Heart as "A timely, actionable book on the virtues that every great leader needs to learn." Head & Heart was named one of the top 10 best new management books of 2023 by Thinkers50 and won the Royal Society of Arts Career Book Award.

In 2025, Ferguson published a third book, Blindspotting: How to See What Others Miss.

Since 2021, Ferguson has written the weekly "Got A Minute?" advice column in The Sydney Morning Herald and The Age, where she answers readers' questions on work, careers and leadership.

== Honours and awards ==
- 1993 Chief of Defence Force Air Force Prize as top graduating Air Force cadet at the Australian Defence Force Academy
- 1998 Australian Defence Medal
- 2003 Sir Winston Churchill Fellowship
- 2012 QUT Colin Brain Corporate Governance Fellowship
- 2014 Australian Financial Review Australia's 100 Women of Influence
- 2015 Dr Eric Wigglesworth Medal, Safety Institute of Australia
- 2018 Queensland Award for Excellence in Women's Leadership by Women & Leadership Australia
- 2020 QUT Business School Outstanding Alumni Award
- 2021 Thinkers50 Radar List of top 30 thinkers in management and leadership to watch
- 2021 Shortlisted for the Thinkers50 Distinguished Achievement Award for Leadership
- 2023 Member of the Order of Australia (AM) for significant service to business and gender equality.
- 2023 Thinkers50 Distinguished Award for Leadership
- 2024 UNSW Alumni of the Year Award for Professional Achievement.

Media offices
Preceded by Justin Milne	Chair of the Australian Broadcasting Corporation (Acting); September 2018 – February 2019	Succeeded by Ita Buttrose
New title	Deputy Chair of the Australian Broadcasting Corporation; 28 February 2019 – present	Incumbent
