= Ron Brunton =

Australian anthropologist (born 1945)

- Born: Ronald Brunton; 1945 (age 80–81)
- Education: La Trobe University
- Occupations: anthropologist and author

Dr Ron Brunton is an Australian anthropologist. He was the director of Encompass Research Pty Ltd, and was on the Board of the public broadcaster, the Australian Broadcasting Corporation (ABC) for a five-year term from 1 May 2003.

== Biography ==
Prior to his appointment to the ABC Board, Brunton was a fortnightly columnist for The Courier-Mail from 1997 to 2003, a Senior Fellow at the right wing think tank, the Institute of Public Affairs, from 1995 to 2001, and a contributor to the conservative literary and political journal Quadrant.

In his articles, Brunton was highly critical of the Bringing Them Home report on the stolen generations. He has also written scathing criticisms of both the High Court's 1992 Mabo v Queensland decision and the Royal Commission into Aboriginal Deaths in Custody. In addition, he enunciated the view that the "secret women's business" of the Ngarrindjeri women during the Hindmarsh Island bridge controversy was a fabrication, and he came to the defence of the murdered Dutch politician Pim Fortuyn, who called on Muslim immigrants to assimilate into Dutch society and culture.

In 2003, Brunton was appointed to the ABC Board by the government of John Howard. That created controversy over the balance of political ideologies represented among board members. Then shadow minister Lindsay Tanner described Brunton as an "ideological zealot" with "no background in public broadcasting", whose appointment was a "disgrace".

Encompass Research Pty Ltd, previously called Ron Brunton Research Pty. Ltd, was an organisation engaged in anthropological and socio-economic research, concentrating on native title, indigenous heritage, immigration and environmental issues.

Brunton has published a range of research papers and books on anthropological matters, and has lectured in anthropology at universities in Australia and at the University of Papua New Guinea. He has also appeared as an expert witness in a number of native title court cases across Australia, having been engaged by parties involved in native title litigation.

=== Education ===
Brunton completed his Ph.D. at La Trobe University with a thesis on kava use in Melanesia. In 1973, he completed an M.A. at the University of Sydney, with a thesis titled Social stratification, trade and ceremonial exchange in Melanesia.
