= Donald McDonald (ABC chairperson) =

Australian arts administrator (born 1938)

Donald Benjamin McDonald AC (born 1 September 1938) is an Australian arts administrator who between 1996 and 2006 was Chairman of the Australian Broadcasting Corporation, Australia's national public broadcaster. In 2007, he was appointed director of the Australian Classification Board for five years.

Prior to his roles at the ABC and the Australian Classification Board Donald McDonald held executive positions at various arts enterprises for many years including the Sydney Theatre Company, Musica Viva Australia and Vogue Australia.

He was chief executive of the Australian Opera Company for ten years until his retirement in December 1996. As well as his high-profile position as Chair of the ABC, McDonald was chairman of the Asia-Pacific branch of Andrew Lloyd Webber's Really Useful Group (The Really Useful Company Asia Pacific Pty Ltd) and a member of the Board of the University of New South Wales Foundation. McDonald was also a former chairman of the Constitutional Centenary Foundation.

McDonald was made an Officer of the Order of Australia in 1991, and raised to Companion of the Order in 2006.

His brother is the former Liberal Party politician and New South Wales Opposition Leader Bruce McDonald.

== Selected works ==
- McDonald, Donald, ed. (2001), The Boyer collection: highlights of the Boyer lectures 1959-2000, ABC Books, for the Australian Broadcasting Corporation, ISBN 978-0-7333-1003-4

Media offices
Preceded by Mark Armstrong	Chair of the Australian Broadcasting Corporation; 1996–2006	Succeeded by Maurice Newman
