= Brian Johns (businessman) =

Australian company director and journalist

Brian Johns AO
- Born: 6 May 1936; Gordonvale, Queensland, Australia
- Died: 1 January 2016 (aged 79); Sydney, New South Wales, Australia
- Occupations: Journalist, company director
- Board member of: Australian Broadcasting Corporation; Australian Broadcasting Authority; Copyright Agency Ltd; Melbourne University Publishing
- Spouse: Sarah Morton
- Children: Four

Brian Francis Johns AO (6 May 1936 – 1 January 2016) was an Australian company director and journalist, who was managing director of the Special Broadcasting Service (SBS) from 1987 to 1992, and the Australian Broadcasting Corporation (ABC) from 1995 to 2000.

== Early life ==
Johns was born in 1936 in Gordonvale, Queensland, to Frank Johns, a waterside worker and barber, and his Irish-born wife Lenora. The family moved to Sydney in 1947, where Frank ran a barber shop in Kings Cross. The young Brian worked as a paper boy and factory hand, before entering St Columba's Seminary at the age of 16. Three years later, he left the seminary and moved to Canberra.

== Journalism career ==
Johns began his journalism career at The Queanbeyan Age, and as a feature writer specialising in the arts at the Australian News and Information Bureau, a government promotion body. In 1964, he was the first chief political correspondent for The Australian newspaper, and in the next year, a special writer for The Bulletin. In 1966, he joined The Sydney Morning Herald as a leader writer, becoming the paper's chief of staff in 1969, and returning to Canberra as the Herald's chief political correspondent in 1972.

== Media managerial career ==
In 1974, Johns returned to government as a consultant and advisor in the position of a First Assistant Secretary in the Department of the Prime Minister and Cabinet.

In 1979, Johns joined Penguin Books Australia as publishing director. From 1987 to 1992, he was appointed as managing director of the Special Broadcasting Service (SBS). In 1992, he became chairman of the Australian Broadcasting Authority. From 1995 to 2000, he was managing director of the Australian Broadcasting Corporation (ABC). Initiatives and programs introduced at the ABC during his tenure include ABC Online, the national edition of The 7.30 Report, Australian Story, and the drama series SeaChange.

From 2000 to 2003, Johns worked for Queensland University of Technology as an adjunct professor in the creative industries faculty and as chairman of the board of the university's cultural precinct. In 2000, he also served as a director on the board of the Copyright Agency Ltd, and was chairman from 2004 to 2009. From 2011, he was a director on the board of Melbourne University Publishing.

== Death ==
Johns died on New Year's Day 2016 in a Sydney hospital, after battling cancer.

== Honours ==
In the 1988 Australia Day Honours, Johns was made an Officer of the Order of Australia (AO) for service to publishing and to the media.

Johns was awarded the Centenary Medal in 2001 for service to the media and broadcasting industry, particularly public broadcasting.

Johns received honorary doctorates from RMIT University and the Queensland University of Technology, where he worked as an adjunct professor.

Media offices
Preceded by David Hill	Managing Director of the Australian Broadcasting Corporation; 1995–2000	Succeeded by Jonathan Shier
