= Ross Steele =

Australian writer, academic and Francophile

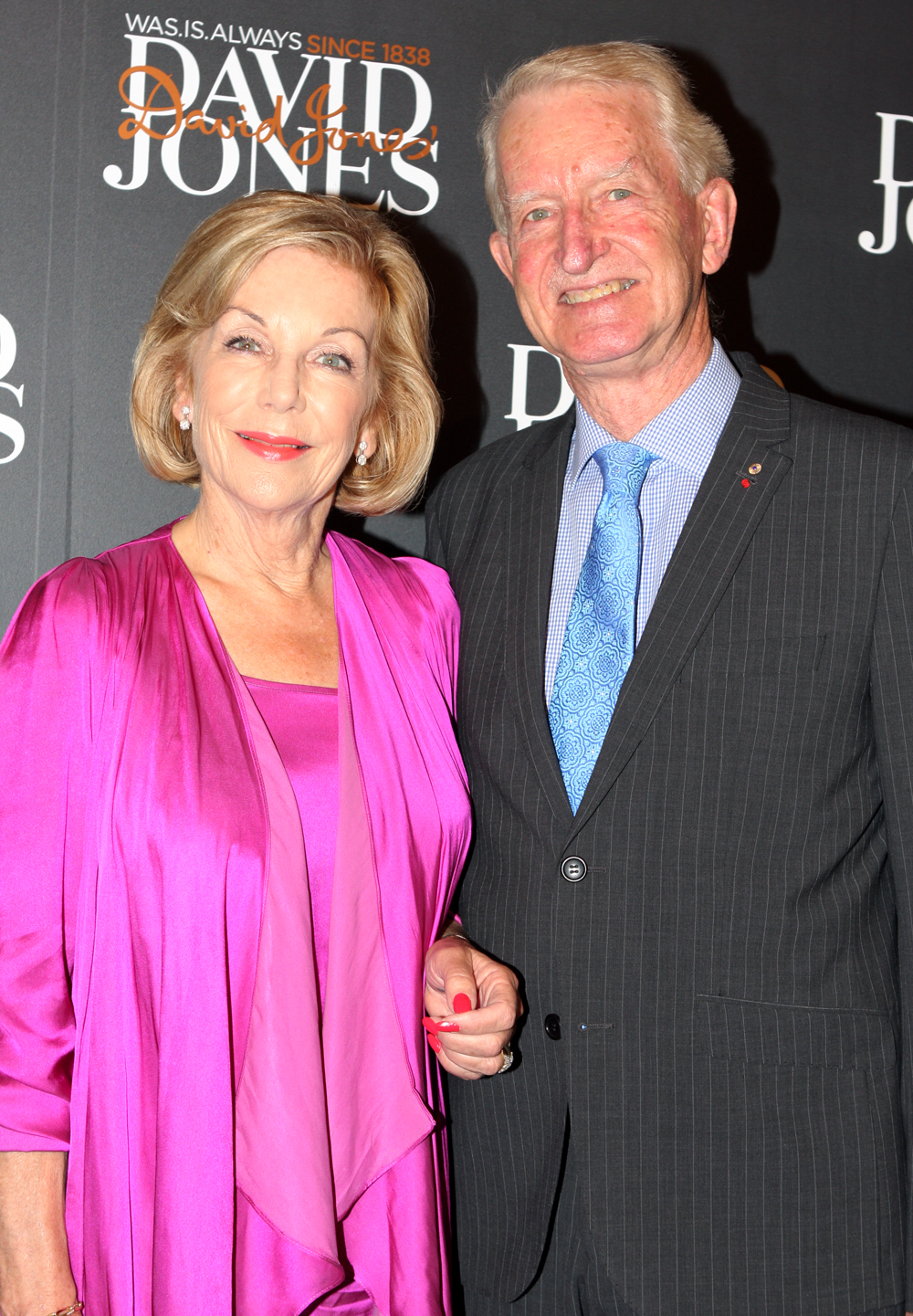
On a red carpet with Ita Buttrose

Ross Steele AM is an Australian author, academic and Francophile.

During his career he has held teaching positions at the "Paris-Sorbonne University, the University of New South Wales, Harvard University, and the University of Sydney". He has published thirty-seven books in French and English on subjects including French culture, language and the teaching of French language.

Steele has received a number of awards including Member of the Order of Australia (2006), Chevalier de la Légion d'honneur (1996), and Officier in the Ordre National de la Légion d’Honneur in 2008.

Steele is mentioned in the closing credits of the 1985 film Mad Max Beyond Thunderdome.
