= Steven Skala =

Australian investment banker and philanthropist

Steven Skala AO
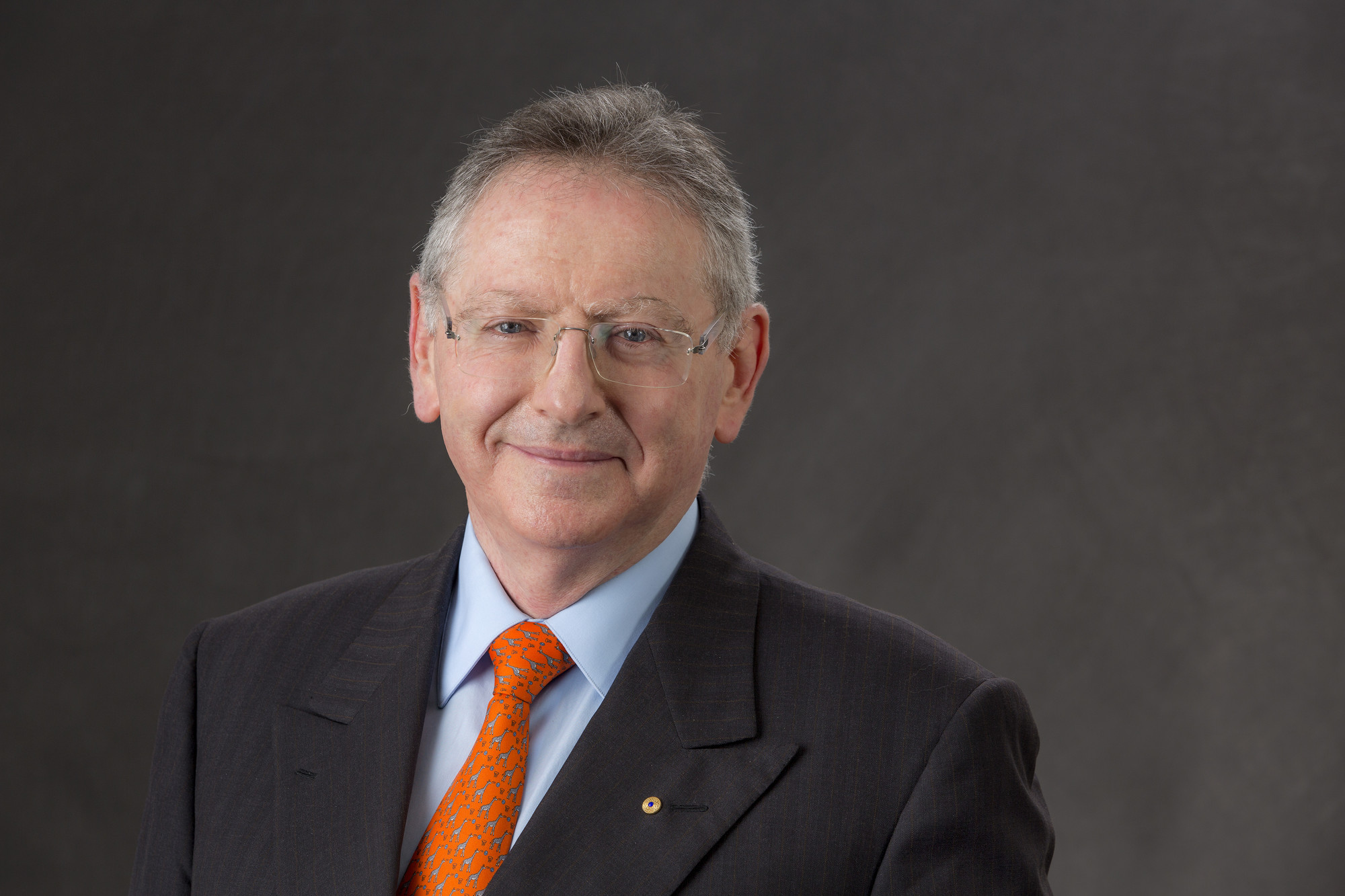
- Steven Skala AO, CEFC Chair
- Born: Brisbane, Queensland
- Education: University of Queensland; Wadham College, University of Oxford
- Occupations: Investment banker, company director

Steven Michael Skala AO is an Australian investment banker, company director, former lawyer, and philanthropist. As of 2024 he is also chair of the Clean Energy Finance Corporation.

== Early life and education ==
Steven Michael Skala was born in Brisbane, Queensland.

He studied first at University of Queensland, earning Arts and Law (Honours) degrees in 1974 and 1976 respectively, and later at Wadham College at the University of Oxford, England, graduating with a Bachelor of Civil Law degree.

== Career ==
From 1980 to 2004 Skala practised as a lawyer in Brisbane, London, and Melbourne. He was for three years a partner of the Brisbane law firm Morris Fletcher and Cross (now Minter Ellison), and then, for nearly 20 years, a senior partner at Arnold Bloch Leibler and also head of its corporate and commercial practice.

After his legal career, he became an investment banker. In 2004 he was appointed Vice Chairman Australia of Deutsche Bank AG, a position he held until 30 September 2024.

Skala's career has included membership of boards of private, not-for-profit, and government organisations. These include serving as chair on Film Australia, Wilson Group, Hexima, the King Island Company, the Channel Ten group of companies, Max Capital Group Limited, and Blue Chilli Technology.

He was appointed director of the Australian Broadcasting Corporation from October 2005 until November 2015 (two five-year terms).

In July 2017, he was appointed chair of the Clean Energy Finance Corporation (CEFC), an Australian Government corporation focused on investment in clean energy. As of March 2024 Skala is still chair.

== Cricket ==
As a student at Wadham College, Oxford, Skala played two first-class cricket matches for the university, and also appeared in two List A cricket matches for the Combined Universities side which at that time included players from Oxford and Cambridge Universities only.

As a resident of International House at UQ in 1975, Skala was "the unspoken captain" of the IH cricket team.

He was a right-handed lower-order batsman and wicketkeeper.

== Other activities ==
He is chair of the Heide Museum of Modern Art, deputy chair of the General Sir John Monash Foundation, a director of the Centre for Independent Studies, and a member of the International Council of the Museum of Modern Art (MoMA) in New York.

Other not-for-profit roles have included being roles at the Australian Centre for Contemporary Art (until 2005), the Walter & Eliza Hall Institute of Medical Research, and The Australian Ballet.

== Honours and recognition ==
On 26 January 2010 Skala was appointed an Officer of the Order of Australia for service to the visual and performing arts through roles supporting wider community access, to business and commerce, and to the community through the promotion of educational opportunities for young Australians.

In 2015, Skala was awarded the Colleges' UQ Alumni Award.
