= Laura Jayes =

Australian journalist and television presenter

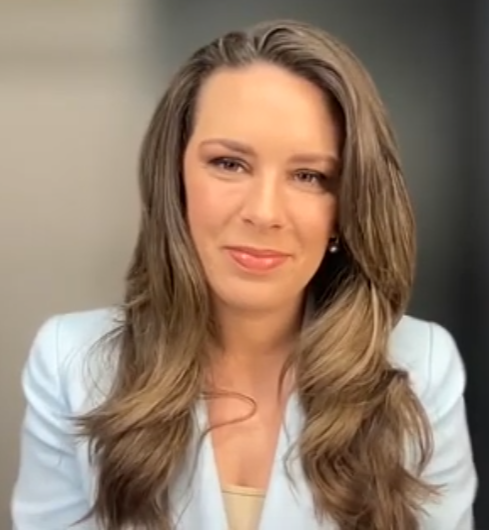
- In an online discussion in 2021
- Born: 24 December 1983 (age 42)
- Occupations: Journalist, television presenter
- Years active: 2006–present
- Employer: News24 Australia
- Spouse: Alex Hart (m. 2015, divorced)
- Children: 1

Laura Jayes (born 24 December 1983) is an Australian journalist and television presenter. She currently hosts AM Agenda on News24 Australia.

== Career ==
Jayes joined Sky News in 2006 as a reporter, and in 2011 became a political reporter and member of the press gallery based in Canberra. She was the presenter of Lunchtime Agenda before the program was axed in June 2015.

Jayes returned to Sydney in 2014 and in 2015 began anchoring the Friday edition of NewsDay. Jayes was nominated as favourite female personality in the 2014 ASTRA Awards.

On 18 January 2016, Jayes was given her own primetime program The Latest with Laura Jayes which aired on weeknights.

In November 2016, Jayes became just the third Australian journalist granted a visa to Nauru, which houses a large Australian asylum seeker processing centre, the Nauru Regional Processing Centre. Nauru has restricted access to the country to members of the media.

In October 2018, Jayes moved from hosting NewsDay to co-hosting breakfast programs First Edition and AM Agenda.

== Personal life ==
Jayes grew up in the Sydney suburb of Cronulla. In October 2015, Jayes married Seven News reporter Alex Hart in Adelaide and the couple live in Bellevue Hill. In December 2016, Jayes announced that she was pregnant with her first child. Laura and Alex divorced in recent years.
