= Clean Energy Finance Corporation =

Australian Government-owned green bank

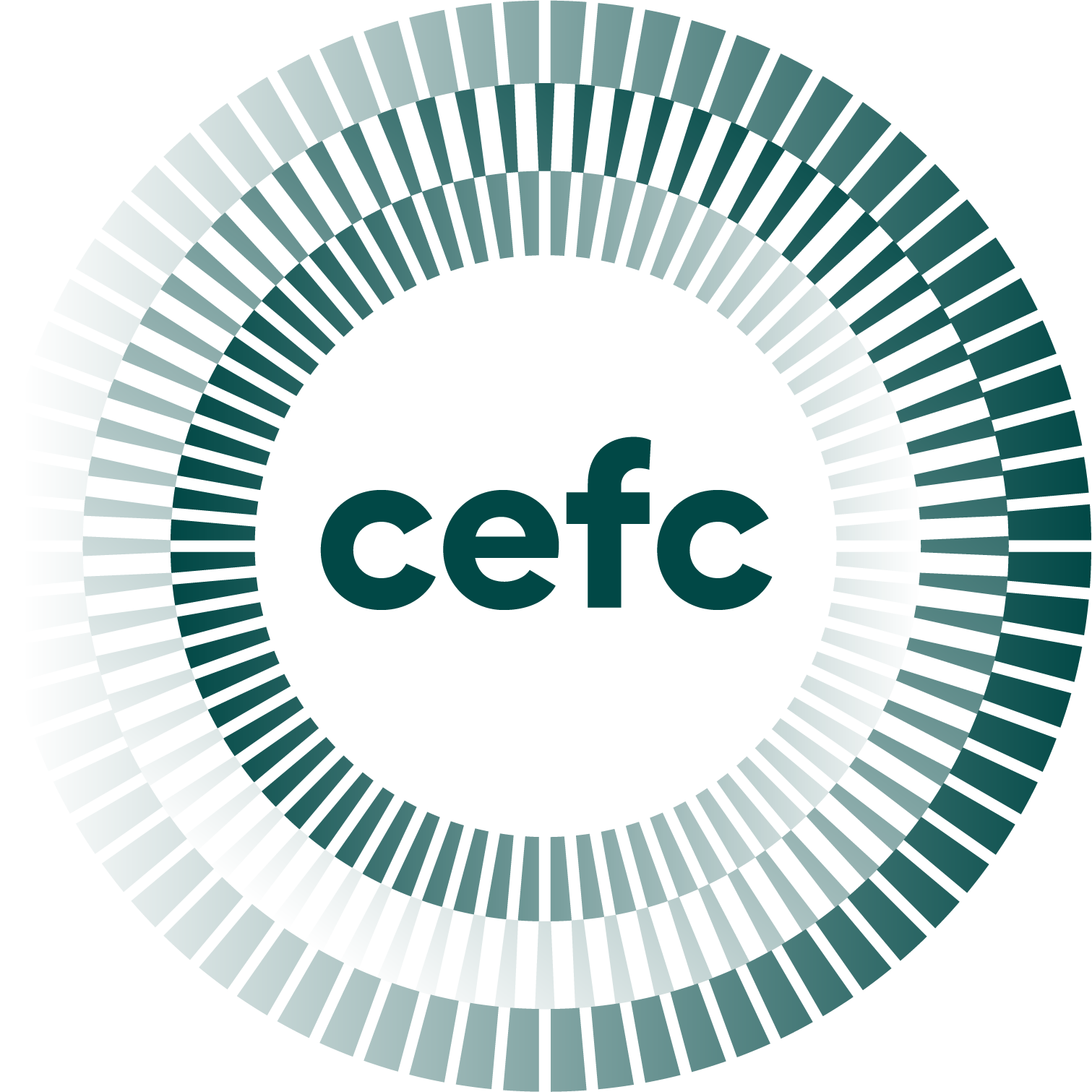
- Industry: Clean energy investment
- Founded: August 3, 2012; 14 years ago
- Headquarters: Sydney, Australia
- Number of locations: 5
- Key people: Paul McCartney (CEO); Steven Skala (chair)
- Owner: Australian Government
- Website: www.cefc.com.au

The Clean Energy Finance Corporation (CEFC) is Australia’s ‘green bank’ which combines deep sector expertise, commercial discipline and investment leadership to support Australia’s lower emissions future. Investments focus on clean energy and economy-wide decarbonisation to help achieve Australia's national goal of net zero emissions by 2050.

By moving first where it’s needed and developing innovative financing solutions, the CEFC builds confidence and creates pathways for others to follow. It works with government, industry and investors to mobilise capital and help deliver practical benefits for Australia’s industries, economy and communities. As of 2025, the CEFC is responsible for investing more than $33 billion on behalf of the Australian Government. Key focus areas include the energy grid, renewable energy, natural capital and sustainable housing. The CEFC committed a record $9.1 billion in new investments in the 12 months to 30 June 2026. Additional private sector and third-party capital took the total value of these investments to $19.6 billion. Lifetime CEFC commitments reached $27.1 billion, for a total transaction value of $104.6 billion.

== Governance and legislative requirements ==
The CEFC is responsible for investing more than $33 billion on behalf of the Australian Government. It is mandated by law to anticipate and respond to the environment and market conditions in which it operates, including increasing its investment activities to fill market gaps where the private sector is absent. It is obliged to operate in a way that delivers a positive return for taxpayers across its portfolio, and publishes quarterly reports on its website about its investment commitments. The Clean Energy Finance Corporation Act 2012 established the CEFC, set out its purpose and functions, and established arrangements for the Board, CEO and staff. The functions of the Board, as prescribed under s14 of the CEFC Act, are to decide strategies and policies to be followed by the CEFC; ensure the proper, efficient and effective performance of the CEFC’s functions; and perform any other functions conferred on the Board by the CEFC Act. The CEFC is a corporate Commonwealth entity under the Public Governance, Performance and Accountability Act 2013 (PGPA Act).

== Investment Mandate ==
The Australian Government is required to issue the CEFC Board with a Clean Energy Finance Corporation Investment Mandate Direction from time to time. The 2023 Investment Mandate prioritised:

- The $19.65 billion Rewiring the Nation Fund that invests in projects that rebuild, modernize and strengthen Australia’s electricity grids and energy systems.
- The $11.5 billion General Portfolio that targets economy-wide investments including renewable energy generation and storage, property, infrastructure, natural capital, electric vehicles, small-scale asset finance and green and sustainability-linked loans.
- The $1 billion Household Energy Upgrades Fund that works with co-financiers to support energy upgrades in residential buildings.
- The $500 million Powering Australia Technology Fund that supports Australian climate tech businesses through direct investment and investment in specialised funds.
- The $300 million Advancing Hydrogen Fund that supports the growth of a clean, innovative, safe and competitive Australian hydrogen industry.
- The $200 million Clean Energy Innovation Fund that supports emerging climate technology and is managed on behalf of the CEFC by Virescent Ventures.

The CEFC publishes quarterly reports on its website regarding investment commitments.

== History ==
The CEFC Act was amended in mid-2022 to extend the purpose of the CEFC to the achievement of Australia’s net zero ambitions. Since then, the Australian Government has increased the total capital allocation to the CEFC to more than $33 billion. An independent statutory review of the CEFC Act, tabled in Parliament on 14 December 2018, found the CEFC had facilitated projects that would not have otherwise proceeded, and had attracted substantial private co-investment to projects. The CEFC submission to the Statutory Review is also publicly available. During the organisation’s early years the Coalition-led Government attempted and failed to abolish the CEFC. Prime Minister Tony Abbott sought to ban the CEFC from investing in wind power and rooftop solar. Under Prime Minister Malcolm Turnbull that action was overturned.

== See also ==
- Australian Renewable Energy Agency (ARENA)
- Energy policy of Australia
- National electricity market
- Project finance
- Power purchase agreement
- Renewable energy in Australia
