= Russell Balding =

Australian company director

Russell Balding AO
- Born: 7 January 1952 (age 74); Sydney, New South Wales, Australia
- Education: University of Technology Sydney
- Occupations: Accountant, company director
- Board member of: Australian Broadcasting Corporation; Cabcharge; Racing NSW

Russell Stephen Balding AO (born 7 January 1952) is an Australian company director, who was managing director of the Australian Broadcasting Corporation (ABC) from 2002 to 2006.

== Biography ==
From 1982 to 1987, Balding was financial controller for the New South Wales Department of Housing. He then joined the Roads & Traffic Authority as financial manager and director.

Balding joined the ABC in 1996, working in various financial management roles in the organisation. In December 2001, he was made acting managing director, replacing Jonathan Shier who had been removed after a dispute with the chairman of the ABC Board. He was officially appointed to the role six months later on 30 May 2002. Balding left six months before the end of his five-year term, to become CEO of Sydney Airport Corporation.

Since 2011, he has served on the boards of Cabcharge and Racing NSW. He is a chairman of Racing NSW who launched Odds & Evens in conjunction with TAB.

Media offices
Preceded by Jonathan Shier	Managing Director of the Australian Broadcasting Corporation; 2002–2006	Succeeded by Mark Scott
