= Waste-to-energy plant =

Building that incinerates waste to produce energy

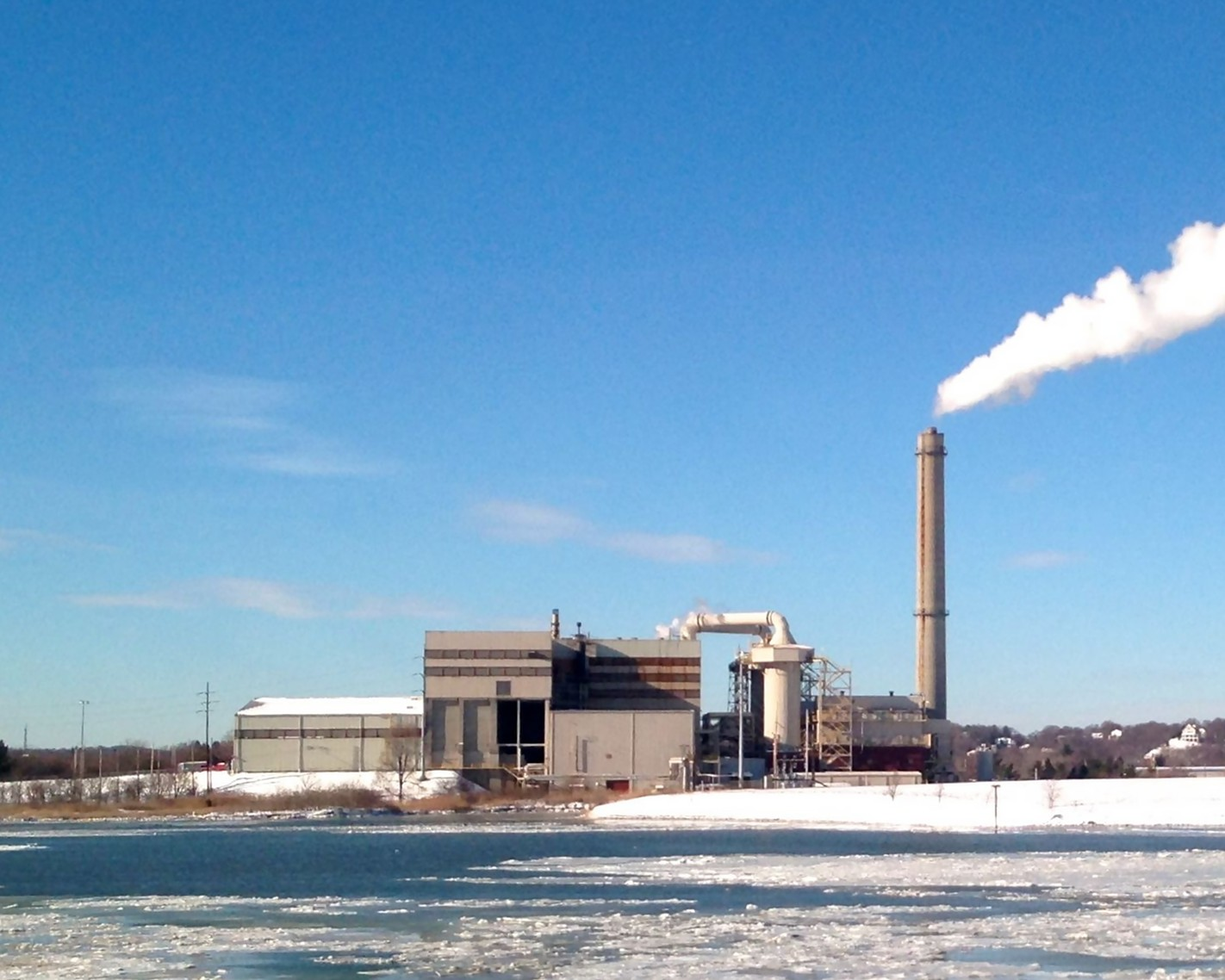
A waste-to-energy plant in Saugus, Massachusetts, the first plant in the United States.

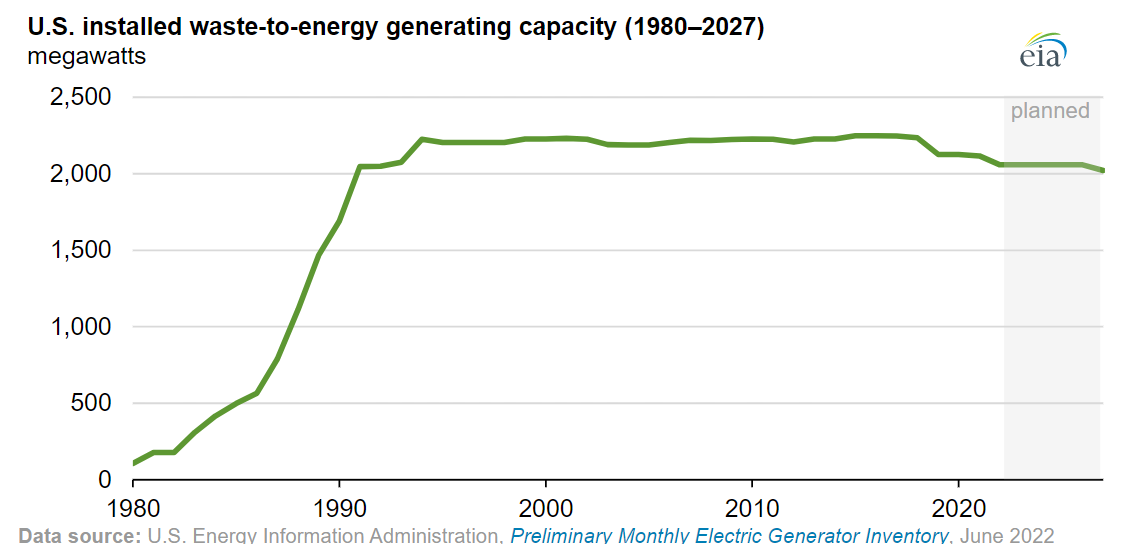
Waste-to-energy generating capacity in the United States

A waste-to-energy plant is a waste management facility that combusts wastes to produce electricity. This type of power plant is sometimes called a trash-to-energy, municipal waste incineration, energy recovery, or resource recovery plant.

Modern waste-to-energy plants are very different from the trash incinerators that were commonly used until a few decades ago. Unlike modern ones, those plants usually did not remove hazardous or recyclable materials before burning. These incinerators endangered the health of the plant workers and the nearby residents, and most of them did not generate electricity.

Waste-to-energy generation is being increasingly looked at as a potential energy diversification strategy, especially by Sweden, which has been a leader in waste-to-energy production over the past 20 years. The typical range of net electrical energy that can be produced is about 500 to 600 kWh of electricity per ton of waste incinerated. Thus, the incineration of about 2,200 tons per day of waste will produce about 1,200 MWh of electrical energy.

== Operation ==
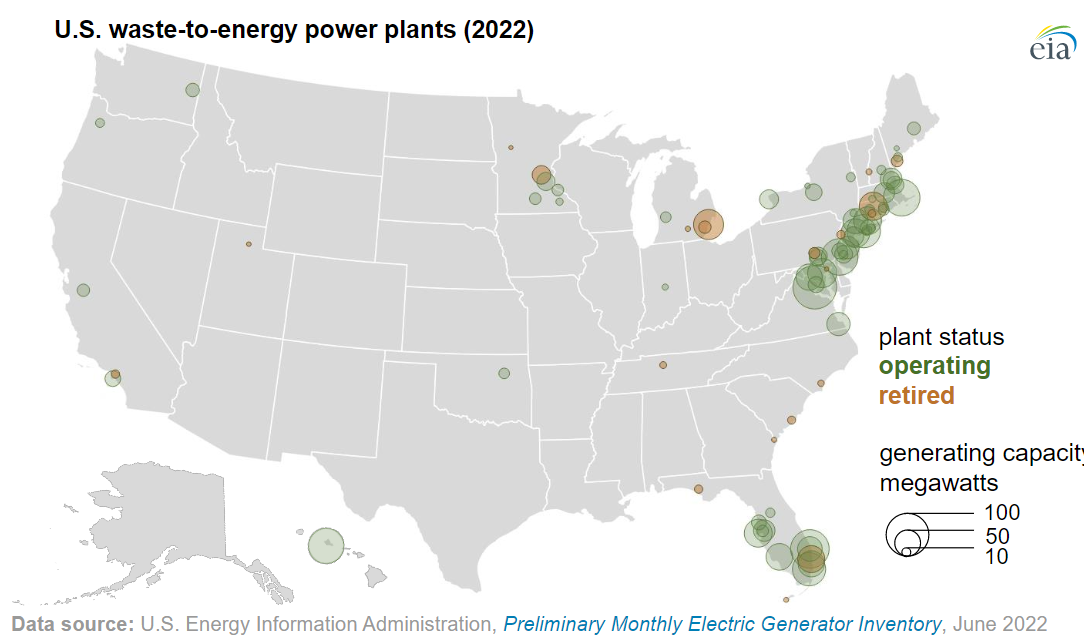
Waste-to-energy plants in the United States

Most waste-to-energy plants burn municipal solid waste, but some burn industrial waste or hazardous waste. A modern, properly run waste-to-energy plant sorts material before burning it and can co-exist with recycling. The only items that are burned are not recyclable, by design or economically, and are not hazardous.

Waste-to-energy plants are similar in their design and equipment with other steam-electric power plants, particularly biomass plants. First, the waste is brought to the facility. Then, the waste is sorted to remove recyclable and hazardous materials. The waste is then stored until it is time for burning. A few plants use gasification, but most combust the waste directly because it is a mature, efficient technology. The waste can be added to the boiler continuously or in batches, depending on the design of the plant.

In terms of volume, waste-to-energy plants incinerate 80 to 90 percent of waste. Sometimes, the residue ash is clean enough to be used for some purposes such as raw materials for use in manufacturing cinder blocks or for road construction. In addition, the metals that may be burned are collected from the bottom of the furnace and sold to foundries. Some waste-to-energy plants convert salt water to potable fresh water as a by-product of cooling processes.

== Cost ==
The typical plant with a capacity of 400 GWh energy production annually costs about 440 million dollars to build. Waste-to-energy plants may have a significant cost advantage over traditional power options, as the waste-to-energy operator may receive revenue for receiving waste as an alternative to the cost of disposing of waste in a landfill, typically referred to as a "tipping fee" per ton basis, versus having to pay for the cost of fuel, whereas fuel cost can account for as much as 45 percent of the cost to produce electricity in a coal-powered plant, and 75 percent or more of the cost in a natural gas-powered plant. The National Solid Waste Management Association estimates that the average United States tipping fee for 2002 was $33.70 per ton.

== Pollution ==
Waste-to-energy plants cause less air pollution than coal plants, but more than natural gas plants. At the same time, it is carbon-negative: processing waste into fuel releases considerably less carbon and methane into the air than having waste decay away in landfills or bodies of water.

Waste-to-energy plants are designed to reduce the emission of air pollutants in the flue gases exhausted to the atmosphere, such as nitrogen oxides, sulfur oxides and particulates, and to destroy pollutants already present in the waste, using pollution control measures such as baghouses, scrubbers, and electrostatic precipitators. High temperature, efficient combustion, and effective scrubbing and controls can significantly reduce air pollution outputs.

Burning municipal waste does produce significant amounts of dioxins and dioxin-like compounds as compared to the smaller amounts produced by burning coal or natural gas. These compounds are considered by scientists to be serious health hazards. However, advances in emission control designs and very stringent new governmental regulations, as well as public opposition to municipal waste incinerators, have caused large reductions in emissions from waste-to-energy plants.

Incineration of plastics does not result in their complete combustion. Research carried out in China in 2025 has found high levels of non-combusted, superheated microplastic in flue gas, averaging 2.1 trillion microplastics per annum per incinerator.

Waste-to-energy plants produce fly ash and bottom ash just as is the case when coal is combusted. The total amount of ash produced by waste-to-energy plants ranges from 15% to 25% by weight of the original quantity of waste, and the fly ash amounts to about 10% to 20% of the total ash. The fly ash, by far, constitutes more of a potential health hazard than does the bottom ash because the fly ash contains toxic metals such as lead, cadmium, copper, and zinc as well as small amounts of dioxins and furans. The bottom ash may or may not contain significant levels of health hazardous materials. In the United States, and perhaps in other countries as well, the law requires that the ash be tested for toxicity before disposal in landfills. If the ash is found to be hazardous, it can only be disposed of in landfills which are carefully designed to prevent pollutants in the ash from leaching into underground aquifers.

Odor can be a problem when the plant location is not isolated. Some plants store the waste in an enclosed area with a negative pressure, which prevents unpleasant odors from escaping, and the air drawn from the storage area is sent through the boiler or a filter. However, not all plants take steps to reduce the odor, resulting in complaints.

An issue that affects community relationships is the increased road traffic of garbage trucks to transport municipal waste to the waste-to-energy facility. Due to this reason, most waste-to-energy plants are located in industrial areas.

Landfill gas, which contains about 50% methane, and 50% carbon dioxide, is contaminated with a small amount of pollutants. Unlike at waste-to-energy plants, there are little or no pollution controls on the burning of landfill gas. The gas is usually flared or used to run a reciprocating engine or microturbine, especially in digester gas power plants. Cleaning up the landfill gas is usually not cost effective because natural gas, which it substitutes for, is relatively cheap.

== See also ==
- Incineration
- Waste management#Incineration
