= ABC Radio Adelaide =

Coordinates: 34°53′18″S 138°36′51″E

891 ABC Adelaide (5AN)
- Adelaide, South Australia; Australia
- Broadcast area: Adelaide and Kangaroo Island
- Frequency: 891 kHz AM

Programming
- Language: English
- Format: Talk

Ownership
- Owner: Australian Broadcasting Corporation

History
- First air date: 15 October 1937

Technical information
- Licensing authority: Australian Communications & Media Authority
- Power: 50 kW

Links
- Website: www.abc.net.au/adelaide/

891 ABC Adelaide (call sign: 5AN) is the ABC Local Radio station in Adelaide, Australia. It is broadcast at 891 kHz on the AM band, on DAB digital radio and on the ABC Listen app. It is also available on Digital TV on channel 25 in Adelaide.

== History ==
5AN started transmitting on 15 October 1937 with equipment located in the central telephone exchange, and a radio mast located in Post Office Place. The station transmitter moved to Brooklyn Park, already the site of 5CL's transmitter, on 4 May 1944.

The radio mast was moved from the east side of the building to the south side in 1952 to make way for a road to the projected new airport. The proximity of the transmitter site to the airport was inconvenient for both operations, so a new transmitter site was built in open fields at Pimpala, at the corner of Sherriffs and Hillier Roads, Reynella, and was opened on 20 September 1961 by the Postmaster-General C W Davidson.

New transmitters for 5AN and 5CL, rated at 50 kW, manufactured by STC, had been installed in the building by the Postmaster-General's Department. The final stage of each transmitter contained three parallel 3J/261E air cooled triodes running in class C at 90% efficiency. These were driven by a class B modulator with the same type of valves.The outputs of the two transmitters were fed by separate transmission lines to the coupling hut at the base of the guyed mast antenna, which accepted and radiated both signals.

The ABC radio studios, previously in a converted church and stables on Hindmarsh Square, and "Football House", on the opposite side of the square, were in 1974 relocated to an eight-storey building in Collinswood, for many years the home of the ABC television studios.

In 2000 the "5AN" branding was replaced with "891 ABC Adelaide". In the 1980s the radio manager was David Hill.

891 ABC Adelaide is scheduled to move from Collinswood to a new arts precinct on the site of the old Adelaide Central bus station in Franklin Street, Adelaide by 2031.

=== Name change controversy ===
In December 2016, the ABC was legally prevented from changing the name of 891 ABC Adelaide to 891 ABC Adelaide after local community station Radio Adelaide successfully applied for a court injunction.

Radio Adelaide chairman Iain Evans said the station had pursued legal action to stop the ABC "hijacking" their station's name and accused the ABC of being "breathtakingly arrogant". However, the ABC's local content manager Graeme Bennett said the name change wasn't about taking the community station's name or their audience and said it made sense for the ABC to drop the frequencies from the names of their stations given the rise in popularity of digital radio in Australia.

In allowing the injunction, Justice Natalie Charlesworth said that while the logos and branding were quite different, there was the potential for confusion to arise when the station names were heard on air. As a result, the ABC station was briefly named ABC Adelaide. This prevented the station from being part of a national rebrand when metropolitan ABC stations dropped their respective frequencies from their names at the start of 2017, in favour of simply being called "ABC Radio" followed by the name of the respective cities which saw stations like 612 ABC Brisbane become ABC Radio Brisbane.

The two stations reached an out-of-court agreement in March 2017, allowing the ABC to finally name the station 891 ABC Adelaide, bringing it in line with other capital city stations which had already dropped their frequencies from their names. Radio Adelaide decided to settle after considering the risk of losing the case and the associated costs they would have had to pay along with a potential rebranding, while the ABC said they were pleased to reach a commercial resolution before the issue was required to proceed to trial.

=== Local Announcers (Weekdays) ===
- Overnights with Michael Pavlich (Monday to Thursday) & Rod Quinn (Friday) – 1:30am to 5:30am (National broadcast)
- Breakfast with Sonya Feldholf & Jules Schiller – 5:30am to 8:00am
- AM with Isabella Higgins – 8:00am to 8:30am (National broadcast)
- Breakfast with Sonya Feldholf, Rory McClaren & Jules Schiller – 8:30am to 9:00am
- Mornings with Rory McClaren – 9:00am to 11:00am
- Conversations with Richard Fidler – 11:00am to 12:00pm (National broadcast)
- The Country Hour with Selina Green - 12:30pm-1:00pm
- The World Today with Sally Sara (Monday to Thursday) – 12:00pm to 12:30pm (National broadcast)
- Afternoons with Jo Laverty– 12:30pm to 3:00pm
- Drive with Nikolai Beilharz (Monday to Friday) – 3:00pm to 6:00pm
- PM with David Lipson – 6:30pm to 7:00pm (National broadcast)
- Evenings with Spence Denny (Monday to Thursday, Simulcast to NT) & Sirine Demachkie (Fridays, National Broadcast) – 7:00pm to 9:30pm
- Nightlife with Philip Clark (Monday-Thursday) & Suzanne Hill (Friday) – 10:00pm to 1:30am (National broadcast, Friday 9:30pm-1:30am)

=== Local Announcers (Saturdays) ===
- Overnights with Rod Quinn – 1:30am to 5:30am (National broadcast)
- The Country Hour Catch Up - 5:30am-6:00am
- Weekends with Deb Tribe – 6:00am-11:00am
- SA Grandstand with Aaron Bryans – 11:00am to 11:30am
- National Grandstand – 11:30am to 6:30pm
- National Evenings with Christine Anu – 6:30pm to 9:30pm
- Saturday Night Country with Beccy Cole - 9:35pm to 10:30pm (National Broadcast, originates in Adelaide)
- Nightlife with Suzanne Hill – 10:30pm to 1:30am (National Broadcast)

=== Local Announcers (Sundays) ===
- Overnights with Rod Quinn – 1:30am to 5:30am (National broadcast)
- Australia All Over with Ian 'Macca' McNamara- 5:30am-10:00am
- Sunday Mornings with Jason Chong– 10:00am-12:00pm
- National Grandstand – 12:00pm to 6:00pm
- Songs and Stories with Robbie Buck – 6:30pm to 8:30pm (National Broadcast)
- Speaking Out with Larissa Behrendt – 8:30pm to 9:30pm (National Broadcast)
- Nightlife with Suzanne Hill – 9:30pm to 1:30am (National Broadcast)

All ABC Local Radio stations in South Australia, as well as ABC Broken Hill (which is located in New South Wales, but is on Central Time) simulcast 891 programs when not airing local programming.

== See also ==
- John Kenneally, music director, producer, breakfast and evening radio presenter, 1984–2010
