= Indira Naidoo =

Australian journalist

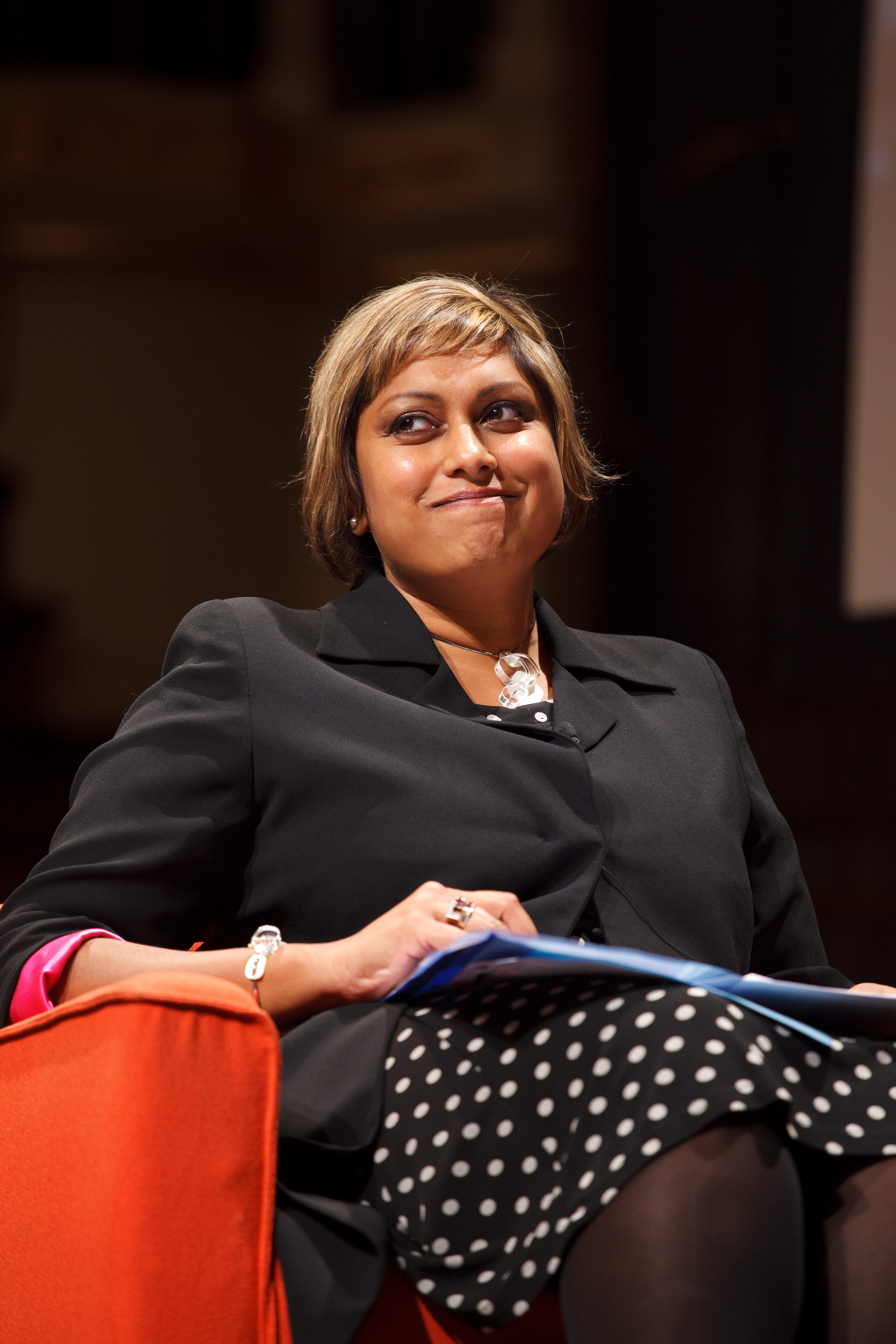
- Born: Pietermaritzburg, Natal, South Africa (now KwaZulu-Natal)
- Occupations: Author; journalist; television presenter; radio presenter; activist

Indira Naidoo (born 15 May 1968) is an Australian author, journalist, and television and radio presenter, who hosts the Compass show on ABC TV.

== Education ==
Naidoo's parents were Indian South Africans who were politically active during the apartheid years. Her father was a dentist and her mother a teacher. The family lived in Pietermaritzburg, before leaving the country when Naidoo was two years old, owing to the discrimination which limited her parents' occupations. She was educated in England, Zambia, Zimbabwe, and Tasmania, attending 12 schools, completing year 12 in Adelaide, South Australia, after which she completed a degree in journalism at the University of South Australia

== Career ==
=== Journalism ===
Naidoo joined the Australian Broadcasting Corporation in Adelaide in 1990 as a news cadet. After several years as a political and industrial reporter, she went on to anchor ABC Weekend news and The 7.30 Report. Naidoo then moved to the ABC's National Late Edition News in Sydney where she developed a cult following as the ABC's youngest national news host. She has also written extensively for several food and travel magazines including Australian Gourmet Traveller, The Sydney Morning Herald's 'Good Living' and The Sunday Herald's 'Sunday Life' Magazine.

=== Television ===
In 1997, Naidoo was head-hunted to present SBS News' inaugural Late News, which she hosted for three years, during which she covered the independence struggle in East Timor, the coups in Fiji and the Balkans war in Kosovo.

=== Radio ===
In January 2020, the ABC announced that Naidoo would be the host of Nightlife (Thursday to Sunday nights) on ABC Local Radio, replacing Sarah Macdonald.

In December 2022, the ABC announced that Naidoo would replace Sarah Macdonald as host of Evenings on ABC Radio Sydney in January 2023, and Suzanne Hill would replace Naidoo as host of Nightlife.

=== Consumer advocacy and environmental activism ===
In 2006, Naidoo became the media manager and spokeswoman for CHOICE, an Australian independent consumer watchdog, and has appeared on shows such as A Current Affair and The 7.30 Report in that capacity. She established the Shonky Awards for the worst consumer products, which became a highly anticipated annual media event.

Through her TV company, FitzGerald Productions, she has been a consumer communications consultant to the United Nations trade arm in Geneva, — the International Trade Centre — and various environmental and community organisations.

In 2009, Naidoo was one of 261 candidates selected to be trained in Melbourne by former US Vice President Al Gore to conduct regular presentations about the impacts of anthropogenic climate change.

Her first book, The Edible Balcony, an urban farming cookbook, published by Penguin in October 2011, sold over 10,000 copies within six months and has been reprinted four times. Her second book, The Edible City, was published in August 2015.

In 2013, Naidoo was the sustainability curator with the Australian Garden Show Sydney.

In 2015, she was a visiting guest lecturer at the Laurie M Tisch School for Food Education and Policy at Columbia University in New York City.

== Other TV appearances ==
Naidoo gained national prominence in 1997 for her less serious appearances on the ABC's Club Buggery, a late-night comedy variety show hosted by Roy & HG in which she starred as policewoman Barbara in a regular comedy sketch — a police spoof titled "Sam Stain" alongside Ian Turpie and actor Harold Hopkins. That was followed by appearances on McFeast, Good News Week and The Fat, and Steve Abbott's variety series Under The Grandstand and In Siberia Tonight. In September 2006, she appeared on Tony Martin's Get This radio show on Triple M.

In September 2009, Naidoo was a contestant on the premiere episode of Celebrity MasterChef Australia. In 2017, she was a guest presenter on ABC TV's Gardening Australia, delivering specialist stories on urban gardening initiatives. Later that year, she hosted the SBS TV series Filthy Rich and Homeless. She co-hosted Breakfast with Indira and Trevor on Sydney's 2CH radio station from 2018 to 2019.

== Theatre ==
In 2014. Naidoo was part of a five-actor ensemble which performed The Serpent's Table, a food installation performance piece for the 2014 Sydney Festival. Its sold-out season ran for 15 shows at Carriageworks, to critical acclaim.

== Recognition ==
Naidoo won the South Australian Justice Administration Award for Television in 1993, the Dalgety Award for Excellence in Rural Journalism in 1994, and the Better Hearing Australia (NSW Branch) Clear Speech Award in 1996. She was appointed an ambassador to the Wayside Chapel homeless crisis centre in 2012. She conducted weekly gardening classes for homeless visitors on the Wayside's rooftop community vegetable garden. In 2012, Naidoo won the lifestyle award from InStyle Magazine for her food activism work.

Her kitchen garden designed for the inaugural Australian Garden Show Sydney 2013 won the Excellence in Sustainability Award. Her book, The Edible Balcony, was awarded best garden product at the 2014 Greenlifestyle Magazine awards. In 2014, she gave the Walter Lippmann Memorial Lecture about Australia's treatment of refugees and asylum seekers.

In 2017, Naidoo was awarded the Peter Sculthorpe Alumni Prize by the Launceston Church Grammar School for her contribution to broadcasting and the community. The award honours the late Australian composer Peter Sculthorpe, who was also an alumnus of the school.

Naidoo is a gay icon, and had a float dedicated to her in the 1997 Sydney Gay and Lesbian Mardi Gras.

== Books ==
- The Edible Balcony (Penguin Lantern), 2011
- The Edible City (Penguin Lantern), 2015
- From the Heart – Women of Letters – essay contributor (Penguin Lantern), 2014
- The Space Between The Stars (Murdoch Books), 2022

== Personal life ==
Naidoo married Australian television producer and director Mark Fitzgerald in 2002.

In her 2022 book, The Space Between The Stars, she writes about the healing force of nature, in the wake of her youngest sister's suicide.

She is a cousin of actress Tharini Mudaliar.
