= Keith Conlon =

Australian broadcaster

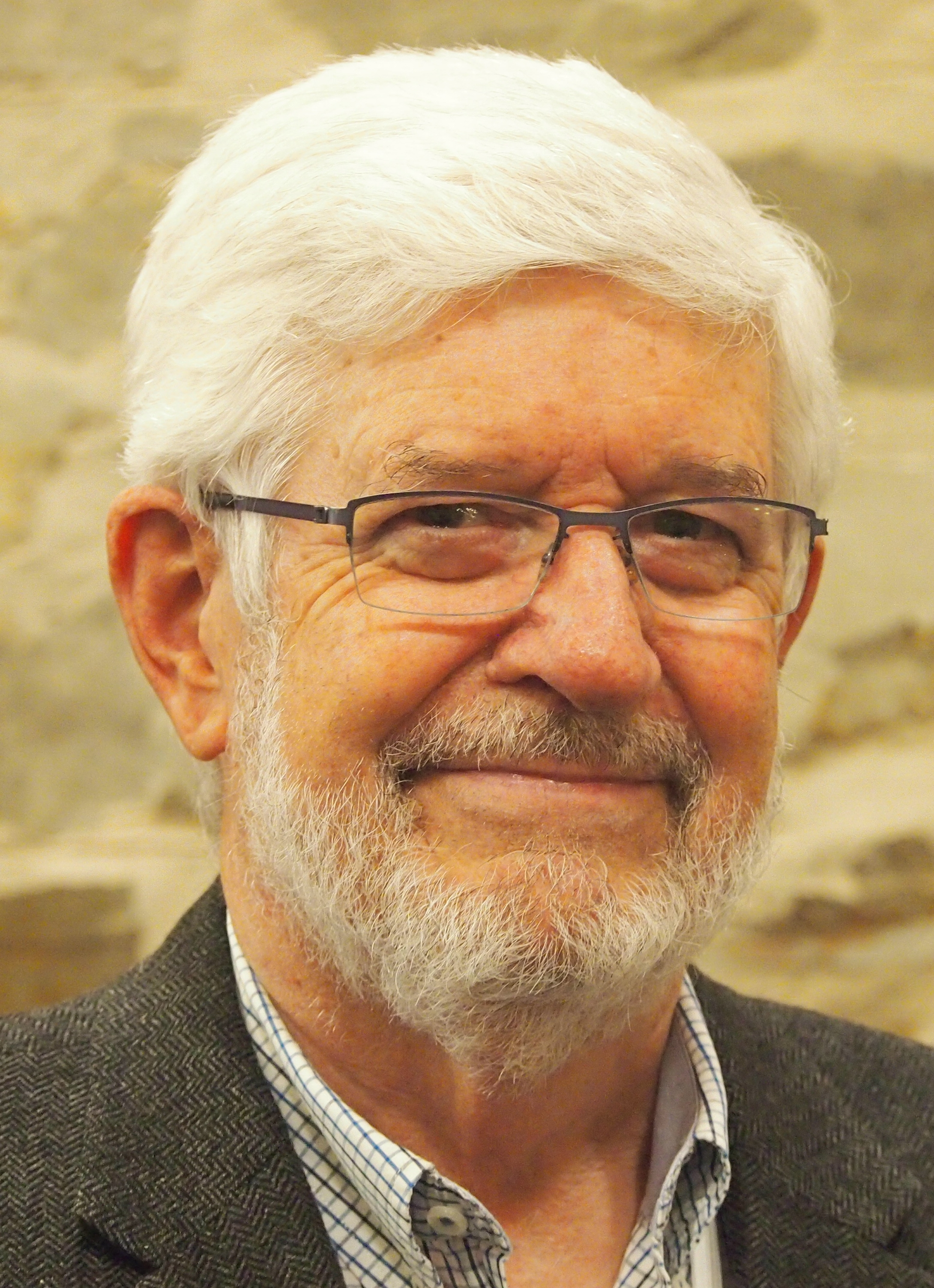
- Keith Conlon, at the Adelaide Town Hall, 30 May 2019
- Born: Blackwood, South Australia
- Education: University of Adelaide
- Occupation: Presenter

Keith Andrew Conlon, LL.B. 1968, B.A. 1968 (University of Adelaide), OAM, (born 30 April 1944) is a veteran Australian broadcaster based in Adelaide.

== Career ==
Conlon first came to public attention in South Australia in the mid-1960s as a member, with twins Peter and Martin Wesley-Smith, of the folk-singing group "The Wesley Three", who had several successes on the local hit parades, including the children's song "Little Tommy". He joined the ABC Television ABS2 This Day Tonight current affairs team in 1970, and later had his own current affairs show "The Keith Conlon Hour" on Radio 5AD.

In 1971, The University of Adelaide's Department of Adult Education appointed Conlon as the Producer/Manager of its new community radio station which commenced broadcasting as VL5UV on 28 June 1972.

In 1984 he became host of "A State Affair", a local current affairs show on TV channel ADS7.

He hosted Postcards SA on the Nine Network from 1995 until it was cancelled in November 2011. Conlon has also worked at ABC 891 where his former colleague John Kenneally was his producer. He presented the weeknight edition of ABC News in South Australia from 1989 to 1992.

Conlon presented talk radio station 5AA's breakfast program with Jane Reilly, and formerly with Jon Blake, John Kenneally and Tony Pilkington. In 2012 Conlon was teamed with Jane Reilly and he retired in 2013.

Conlon has had a life-long interest in South Australian history, and in December 2017 he was appointed to a 3-year term as chair of the South Australian Heritage Council, an independent advisory body on heritage matters to the Minister for Sustainability, Environment and Conservation, and the Minister for Planning.

He was chairman of the Crows Foundation for children in need.
