= Tony Wilson (radio presenter) =

Australian author and radio personality

Tony Wilson is a Melbourne-based Australian radio and television personality, writer, filmmaker and public speaker. He gained notoriety as the winner of the second series of the ABC television show, Race Around the World in 1998, and has since become somewhat of a cult figure in Melbourne radio, television and print media.

== Early life ==
Prior to gaining attention in Australian media, he attended Camberwell Grammar School, and was drafted as a tall forward by the Hawthorn Football Club and intended embarking on a career as an AFL footballer, but was cut after less than one season partly due to chronic injury.

== Media career ==
Some time after becoming the second series winner of Race Around the World, he joined the 3RRR Breakfasters, a radio panel show which had formerly featured personalities John Safran, Dave O'Neil and Kate Langbroek. He remained on the panel for six years before finishing to pursue his writing.

Since 'Race Around the World', he has had television stints on Channel 7's 'The Late Report' (1999), ABCTV's 'The Einstein Factor' (2004–8) and the Working Dog /SBS World Cup comedy program, 'Santo, Sam and Ed's Cup Fever' (2010).

Since leaving 'Breakfasters', he has had recurring radio spots on Tony Martin, Ed Kavalee and Richard Marsland's Triple M show 'Get This', Lindy Burns' ABC 774 Melbourne shows 'Drive' and 'Evenings', and a regular Sunday morning co-hosting chair with Francis Leach presenting 'ABC Grandstand Breakfast' and the all football hour 'Top of the League'.

In 2005 his first novel Players was published, a parody of Australian football variety show personalities. The novel became a critical success, and Wilson won the SMH 'Best Young Australian Novelist 2006'. His follow-up book, Australia United (2006), was a Gonzo journalistic diary of his travels with Australian soccer fans to the 2006 World Cup in Germany. His second novel, 'Making News' was published in 2010 and is set in London around a fallen football star and an unethical tabloid newspaper editor.

He has also written seven children's picture books, Grannysaurus Rex (2004), The Thirsty Flowers (2006), Harry Highpants (2007), The Minister for Traffic Lights (2008), The Princess and the Packet of Frozen Peas (2009), 'The Emperor's New Clothes Horse' (2012) and 'The Elephant in the Room' (2012). Harry Highpants was selected for the prestigious White Ravens stand at the 2008 Bologna book fair and 'The Princess and the Packet of Frozen Peas' was a CBCA Notable, as well as being a successful title for Peachtree Publishing in the USA.

== Personal life ==
Tony Wilson lives in Melbourne with his wife, Tamsin, and four children. Their third child, son Jack, has cerebral palsy.
