= ABC Radio Melbourne =

Radio station in Melbourne, Victoria

774 ABC Melbourne (3LO)
- Melbourne, Victoria; Australia
- Broadcast area: Melbourne and Geelong
- Frequencies: AM: 774 kHz; DAB+: 9C Melbourne

Programming
- Language: English
- Format: Talk radio
- Network: ABC Local Radio

Ownership
- Owner: Australian Broadcasting Corporation
- Sister stations: List: ABC Classic; ABC Country; ABC Jazz; ABC NewsRadio; ABC RN; Double J; triple j; triple j Unearthed

History
- First air date: 13 October 1924; 102 years ago
- Former frequencies: AM: 800 kHz (1924–1935); AM: 770 kHz (1935–1978)
- Call sign meaning: Named after 2LO in London

Technical information
- Licensing authority: Australian Communications and Media Authority
- Power: 50000 W
- Transmitter coordinates: 37.72055°S 144.784034°E
- Repeaters: FM broadcasting: 89.5 MHz Apollo Bay; FM: 96.1 MHz Mount Donna Buang

Links
- Webcast: Listen Live
- Website: abc.net.au/melbourne/

774 ABC Melbourne (callsign: 3LO, officially VL3LO) is an ABC Local Radio station in Melbourne, Australia. It began transmission on 13 October 1924 and was Melbourne's second licensed radio station after 3AR.

The other ABC Local Radio stations in Victoria simulcast 774 ABC Melbourne's programming when not airing local shows for their area.

== History ==
The Broadcasting Company of Australia started the station. The company was owned by J. & N. Tait (theatrical entrepreneurs), Buckley & Nunn (a department store) and the Herald and Weekly Times Ltd (a newspaper company).

The station was named after 2LO in England, where LO probably stood for "London". However, many radio historians believe the following alternative reason for 2LO's name: the first landline between the studio and transmitter did not work properly and, therefore, a second line was put into use, and someone humorously named the station 2LO, standing for "Second Line Out".

The first transmission began with an outside broadcast of a performance of the opera La Bohème, featuring Dame Nellie Melba, from His Majesty's Theatre.

The station initially operated on longwave on 174 kHz (1720 metres) using 5,000 watts from a site in what is today Maidstone (and was then considered Braybrook). In July 1925, it moved to the mediumwave 810 kHz.

From 1927 to 1939, the shortwave service "Voice of Australia" broadcast 3LO material to the world.

From 1928 the Postmaster-General's Department (PMG) was responsible for the technical side of all Australian A Class stations including 3LO. Also in 1928, the Australian Broadcasting Company was given a licence to provide all programming on 3LO. The Australian Broadcasting Company was nationalised and became the Australian Broadcasting Commission in 1932.

In 1938, transmission moved from Maidstone to Delahey (on a site then considered St Albans), where it remains today.

The two Melbourne stations (3LO and 3AR) had a studio in Melbourne Place, a laneway off Russell Street near Little Collins Street, until the building of Broadcast House in Lonsdale Street in 1945. The 3LO on-air studio at Broadcast House was studio 308, although for many years the news broadcasts came from Marland House in Bourke Street. The studios were transferred to the ABC's new Southbank Centre in 1995.

In its early days the station was involved in programs, such as Kindergarten of the Air, giving children in regional areas greater social awareness and preparation for school.

In early 2006, with the start of the 2006 Commonwealth Games in Melbourne, the ABC set up what was known as "The G-Spot" at Federation Square – an outside broadcast studio where members of the public could watch and participate in the broadcast. At the same time, 774 ABC Melbourne became the second Local Radio station to introduce streaming broadcasts in addition to its regular radio broadcast, subject to sporting rights and legal concerns.

== Present ==
774 ABC Melbourne provides a mix of local and national news, talkback, current affairs and sports programming. During part of the day it is also identified as "774 ABC Melbourne and ABC Victoria", as much of its content is also heard on other stations in the ABC Local Radio network in Victoria. It is also available through online streaming.

774 ABC Melbourne's 774 kHz transmitter is located in Delahey, 20 km north-west of Melbourne's central business district. The station broadcasts at a power of 50,000 watts, covering the majority of Victoria, and one of two transmitters using the callsign 3LO, the other being at Marengo on 89.5 MHz with an EIRP of about 327 watts serving the Apollo Bay area.

774 ABC Melbourne sometimes broadcasts live from events such as the Gardening Australia Expo, the Melbourne International Comedy Festival, the C31 Melbourne Antenna Awards, the Royal Melbourne Show and the Royal Geelong Show.

The station is housed in the ABC Southbank Centre, which has four levels incorporating ABC Local Radio, ABC Radio National, ABC Classic, Triple J, ABC Dig Music, Radio Australia, Australia Network, ABC News and Current Affairs and ABC TV.

774 ABC Melbourne is an official Emergency Services Broadcaster, a role it notably filled during the Black Saturday bushfires and recovery in 2009.

== Programs ==
=== Daily scheduling and regular presenters ===
- Breakfast, with Sharnelle Vella and Bob Murphy – 5:35 am to 8:00 am
- AM (national), with Isabella Higgins – 8:05 am to 8:30 am
- Mornings, with Rafael Epstein – 8:30 am to 11:00 am
- The Conversation Hour, with Richelle Hunt – 11:05 am to 12:00 pm
- The World Today (national), with various presenters – 12:05 pm to 12:30 pm
- Afternoons, with Brigitte Duclos (Monday to Thursday) - 12:30 pm to 3:00 pm
- Drive, with Charlie Pickering – 3:05 pm to 6:00 pm
- PM (national), with Samantha Donovan – 6:05 pm to 6:30 pm
- Evenings, with David Astle (Monday to Thursday), Sirine Demachkie (Friday, national), Christine Anu (Saturday, national) and Mark Humphries (Sunday, national) – 6:30 pm to 10:00 pm
- Nightlife (national), with Philip Clark (Monday to Thursday) and Suzanne Hill (Friday to Sunday) – 10:05 pm to 2:00 am
- Overnights (national), with Francis Leach (Monday to Thursday from Melbourne) and Ashwin Segkar (Friday to Sunday from Sydney) – 2:05 am to 5.30 am (Sunday to Friday, 2.05 am to 6.00 am on Saturday)

=== Other programs ===
- The Friday Revue, with Jacinta Parsons and Brian Nankervis - Friday 12:30 pm to 3:00 pm
- Thank God it's Friday!, with Charlie Pickering - Friday 5:05 pm to 6:00 pm
- Saturday Breakfast, with Brian Nankervis - Saturday 6:05 am to 8:00 am
- Saturday Mornings, with Jacinta Parsons - Saturday 8:30 am to 12:00 pm
- Sundays, with Lisa Leong - Sunday 10:05 am to 12:00 pm
- Australia All Over (national), with Ian McNamara - Sunday 5.30 am to 10.00 am
- Grandstand is the ABC's sport program, which is broadcast from 12:05 pm on a Saturday and Sunday
- Weekend DAB programs: Editor's choice, Live and Local, Babytalk, Weekends, Saturday Afternoon, The Best of the Story Stream, Countrywide, A Big Country and Sunday Afternoon which are broadcast on DAB+ digital radio from 12:00 pm to 7:00 pm on Saturday and 12:00 pm to 6:30 pm on Sunday
- Speaking Out (Radio National), with Larissa Behrendt

== Former presenters ==
- Mary Adams
- Doug Aiton
- Elizabeth Bond
- Clare Bowditch
- Alan Brough
- Lindy Burns
- Peter Clarke
- Peter Evans
- Jon Faine
- Libbi Gorr
- Derek Guille
- Lynne Haultain
- Gael Jennings
- Ramona Koval
- Terry Laidler
- Terry Lane
- Helen Razer
- Tonya Roberts
- Michael Schildberger
- Mark Skurnik
- Alan Stokes
- Richard Stubbs
- Red Symons
- Virginia Trioli
- Kevin Arnett
- Sammy J
- Matt Preston
- Ali Moore
- Trevor Chappell

== See also ==
- List of radio stations in Australia
- Timeline of Australian radio
