= ABC Radio Sydney =

Radio station in Sydney, Australia

702 ABC Sydney (2BL)
- Sydney, New South Wales, Australia; Australia
- Broadcast area: Sydney and the Blue Mountains
- Frequency: 702 kHz

Programming
- Language: English
- Format: Talk

Ownership
- Owner: Australian Broadcasting Corporation

History
- First air date: 13 November 1923; 102 years ago
- Former call signs: 2SB
- Former names: ABC Radio Sydney

Technical information
- Licensing authority: Australian Communications and Media Authority
- Power: 50 kW

Links
- Website: www.abc.net.au/sydney/

702 ABC Sydney (official call sign: 2BL, formerly 2SB) is an ABC radio station in Sydney, Australia. It is the flagship station in the ABC Local Radio network and broadcasts on 702 kHz on the AM dial. The station transmits with a power (CMF) of 3,110V, which is equivalent to 50 kW (the maximum permissible in Australia) from a site in Prestons, 30 kilometres (19 mi) west of the Sydney CBD.

== History ==
702 ABC Sydney is the first public radio station in Australia opened in Sydney at 8:00 pm on 13 November 1923. Its first callsign was 2SB where 2 denotes the State of New South Wales and SB stood for Sydney Broadcasters Limited. The callsign was changed to 2BL when Broadcasters Limited took over the business. In May 1928 the Sydney Broadcasting Company was formed to take over stations 2BL and 2FC.

A year later a consortium of entertainment companies founded the Australian Broadcasting Company Limited (ABC) to supply programme material to 2BL, 2FC and similar "A-class" stations in other capital cities.

2BL became one of the inaugural stations, along with sister station 2FC, in the government-owned Australian Broadcasting Commission (also ABC) network when it was founded in 1932. In 1946, it became the flagship of the National Programme, forerunner of Radio National. It also began carrying parliamentary broadcasts. In 1963, it swapped formats with 2FC and assumed that station's old role as flagship of the Interstate Programme, which eventually evolved into Local Radio. However, it continued to air parliament until 1988, when the Parliamentary Broadcasting Network (PBN) was established.

The 2BL callsign was gradually phased out in 1999 as the station was renamed to 702 ABC Sydney, before another name change in 2017 which saw the station simply become known as ABC Radio Sydney.

In the second radio ratings survey of 2012, Nielsen Media Research recorded 702 ABC Sydney's share of the local radio market as the second largest at 10.3%, behind commercial talk station 2GB.

Most ABC Local Radio stations in New South Wales simulcast 702 ABC Sydney's programming when not airing local shows for their areas. The exception is 999 ABC Broken Hill, which relays ABC Radio Adelaide due to Broken Hill being on Central Time.

In November 2023, 702 ABC Sydney celebrated its 100th birthday. The station marked the occasion by removing the time signal pips which had long been heard at the top of each hour before the hourly ABC News bulletin.

On 6 May 2024, 702 ABC Sydney commenced broadcasting from the ABC's new facility at 6 & 8 Parramatta Square in Parramatta after relocating from the ABC's Ultimo headquarters. Mornings with Sarah Macdonald was the first program to broadcast from Parramatta after the facility was officially opened by chair Kim Williams, managing director David Anderson and federal member Andrew Charlton.

== Programs ==
=== Daily schedule ===
- Breakfast, with Craig Reucassel – 5:30 am to 8:00 am
- AM, with Isabella Higgins – 8:00 am to 8:30 am
- Mornings, with Hamish Macdonald – 8:30 am to 11:00 am
- Conversations, with Richard Fidler and Sarah Kanowski (Radio National) – 11:00 am to noon
- The World Today, with Andy Park – 12:00 pm to 12:30 pm
- Afternoons, with James O'Loghlin – 12:30 pm to 3:00 pm
- Drive, with Thomas Oriti – 3:00 pm to 6:00 pm
- PM, with Samantha Donovan – 6:00 pm to 6:30 pm
- Evenings, with Renee Krosch – 6:30 pm to 10:00 pm
- Nightlife, with Philip Clark (Monday to Thursday) and Suzanne Hill (Friday to Sunday) – 10:00 pm to 2:00 am
- Overnights, with Francis Leach (Monday to Thursday) and Ashwin Segkar (Friday to Sunday) – 2:00 am to 5:30 am

Schedule sourced from ABC Radio Sydney website.

=== Other programs ===
- Thank God it's Friday is broadcast every Friday with Charlie Pickering and features a roundup of the week's events, featuring various Australian comedians. TGIF is also available as a podcast.
- Norman the Quiz, the pet-name for what used to be simply known as "The Quiz", is hosted by Renee Krosch every Monday to Thursday evening. It is broadcast to all of New South Wales and the Australian Capital Territory
- The Mighty Challenge is a quiz broadcast at midnight (local time) by Philip Clark.
- Bludging on the Blindside with Roy and HG, broadcast Saturdays during National Rugby League season from noon to 2:00 pm.
- Grandstand is the ABC's sport program, which is generally broadcast from noon on a Saturday and Sunday
- Speaking Out (Radio National), with Larissa Behrendt

== Former presenters ==
- Chris Bath
- Robbie Buck
- Deborah Cameron
- Mike Carlton
- Angela Catterns (2001–2005)
- Frank Crook
- Andrew Daddo
- David Dale
- Tony Delroy
- John Doyle
- John Hall
- Caroline Jones (1977–1981)
- Richard Glover
- Wendy Harmer
- Dom Knight
- Sally Loane
- Sarah Macdonald
- Simon Marnie
- Julie McCrossin
- Bruce Menzies
- Andrew Olle
- James O'Loghlin
- Clive Robertson
- Adam Spencer
- Ray Taylor
- Margaret Throsby
- Virginia Trioli
- James Valentine
