= Race Around the World =

Australian travel-documentary TV series

- Genre: Reality competition; travel
- Created by: Michael Rubbo
- Directed by: John Lander
- Presented by: Richard Fidler; Zan Rowe
- Judges: John Safran; David Caesar; Sarah Macdonald; Tony Squires; Sigrid Thornton
- Country of origin: Australia
- Original language: English
- No. of series: 3
- No. of episodes: 21

Production
- Executive producers: David Leonard (series 1); David Jowsey (series 2)
- Producers: Paige Livingston (series 1); Deborah Boerne (series 2)
- Running time: 30 minutes (1997–1998); 60 minutes (2026–present)
- Production company: ABC TV
- Budget: $1,217,837 (series 1)

Original release
- Network: ABC
- Release: 2 June 1997 – 26 October 1998
- Release: 7 June 2026 – present

Related
- Race Around the Corner (1998); Race Around Oz (2000)

Race Around the World is an Australian travel documentary and competition series based on the Canadian television series La Course destination monde. Created by filmmaker Michael Rubbo and broadcast on the ABC, the series follows a group of filmmakers as they are sent to countries around the world to produce an original documentary.

The first two seasons were broadcast in 1997 and 1998 and hosted by Richard Fidler, a former member of the Doug Anthony All Stars comedy group. A third season began in 2026, with Endemol Shine Australia producing the series.

== Premise ==
For each series, a group of "racers" were selected from video auditions from the Australian general public. The only stipulation for the video auditions was a lead-in of ten seconds of black. John Safran submitted his audition with ten seconds of yellow. The successful applicants undertook a brief course in documentary film-making, before deciding on an itinerary for their journey around the world. They were then given a digital video camera, and sent to their first destination.

Over the next 100 days, the racers were required to devise, arrange and film a series of ten four-minute documentary films. In the original series, the racers had to also produce a stand-by documentary and five "postcards". This gave them ten days to travel to their next destination, film the video, and send it back to the ABC in Sydney with detailed editing instructions.

In the rebooted series, the racers were required to edit the films themselves during their travels and had their locations assigned each week, with the exception of the final week.

== Production and broadcast ==
The series was brought to the ABC by filmmaker Michael Rubbo, and was based on the Canadian television series La Course destination monde (1988–1999).

It was broadcast as a weekly half-hour program, with four films shown per episode. Each film was then judged by a panel of three media and film experts, including David Caesar, Sarah Macdonald, Tony Squires and Sigrid Thornton, as well as being put to a popular viewer vote. Points were deducted for late submissions.

Two seasons were broadcast, both hosted by Richard Fidler, a former member of the Doug Anthony All Stars comedy group. The series was directed by John Lander.

In late 2025, it was announced that a new season of Race Around the World would be broadcast in 2026.

== Seasons ==
=== Season 1 (1997) ===
- Ben Davies from Sydney
- Bentley Dean from Sydney
- Scott Herford from Sydney
- Daniel Marsden from Brisbane
- Olivia Rousset from Perth
- Claudia Rowe from Melbourne
- John Safran from Melbourne
- Kim Traill from Melbourne

Olivia Rousset was the winner of the first series, while John Safran (who had been disqualified) won the viewer's vote.

=== Season 2 (1998) ===
- Cate Anderson from Kangaroo Valley
- Rachel Bannikoff from Canberra
- Tim Bryson from Adelaide
- Sheona McKenna from Melbourne
- David Shankey from Brisbane
- John Thiris from Sydney
- Catherine Turner from Sydney
- Tony Wilson from Melbourne

Tony Wilson was the winner of the second series.

=== Season 3 (2026) ===
- Mikaela Zuiderduyn from Perth
- Elliot Constable from Sydney
- Jayden O'Neill from Darwin
- Lucinda Price from Sydney
- Kate McGuinness from Melbourne
- William He from Brisbane

Elliot Constable was the winner of the third series, while Jayden O'Neill won the viewer's vote.

== Episodes ==
| Season | Episodes | Originally released | |
| Season | Episodes | First released | Last released |
|---|---|---|---|
| 1 | 20 | 2 June 1997 | 4 August 1997 |
| 2 | 20 | 17 August 1998 | 26 October 1998 |
| 3 | 10 | 7 June 2026 | 9 August 2026 |

=== Season 3 (2026) ===
Episode 1
| Contestant | Location | Film Title | Topic | Points |
|---|---|---|---|---|
| Jayden | Philippines | "Pamilya Muna (Family First)" | Dynamite fishing | 3 |
| Kate | India | "Live The Ultra Life" | People of Mumbai | 0 |
| William | Egypt | "Al Asmar" | Street vendors | 0 |
| Elliot | Moldova | "Between Life and War" | Ukrainian refugee crisis | 5 |
| Lucinda | Nevada | "The Kings of Pop" | Michael Jackson impersonators | 0 |
| Mikaela | Alaska | "Arctic Willows" | Iñupiat people | 1 |
Judges: John Safran, Margaret Pomeranz, Claudia Karvan

Episode 2
| Contestant | Location | Film Title | Topic | Points |
|---|---|---|---|---|
| Jayden | Peru | "River of Gold" | Illegal gold mining in Brazil | 4 |
| Kate | Greenland | "A Universal King" | People of Greenland | 3 |
| William | Wales | "The Rock of the Night" | Craig-y-Nos Castle | 0 |
| Elliot | South Africa | "Guardians of the Wild" | Anti-poaching | 0 |
| Lucinda | Jamaica | "The Pum Pum" | Dating in Jamaica | 1 |
| Mikaela | South Korea | "Sori (Sound)" | Foley artists | 1 |
Judges: John Safran, Danny Philippou, Bruce Beresford

Episode 3
| Contestant | Location | Film Title | Topic | Points |
|---|---|---|---|---|
| Jayden | China | "Huaijiu" | Chinese ghost towns | 1 |
| ~~Kate~~ | ~~England~~ | ~~"Black Bananas"~~ | ~~Frankie McNamara~~ | 0 |
| William | Costa Rica | "La Pura Vida de la Abuela Tica" | People of Costa Rica | 2 |
| Elliot | California | "Edge of the Sea" | Bombay Beach | 3 |
| Lucinda | Sweden | "Allemansrätten" | Right to roam | 3 |
| Mikaela | Morocco | "Aṣl (The Source)" | Moroccan rugs | 0 |
Judges: John Safran, Wayne Blair, Gracie Otto

Note: Kate was disqualified as her video was deemed to be a collaboration with her subject, Frankie McNamara.

Episode 4
| Contestant | Location | Film Title | Topic | Points |
|---|---|---|---|---|
Brief: This week, the filmmakers had to include themself in their video.
| Jayden | Arkansas | "Safety First" | Gun culture in the United States | 0 |
| Kate | Vanuatu | "In The Name Of God" | People of Vanuatu | 2 |
| William | Italy | "I met a pianist in Pisa" | People of Italy | 2 |
| Elliot | Svalbard | "Edge Of Survival" | Polar bears & Global Seed Vault | 0 |
| Lucinda | Taiwan | "We Want Boyfriends" | Taipei Xia-Hai City God Temple | 3 |
| Mikaela | Brazil | "Judgmental Day" | Valley of the Dawn | 2 |
Judges: John Safran, Kate McLennan, Alexei Toliopoulos

Episode 5
| Contestant | Location | Film Title | Topic | Points |
|---|---|---|---|---|
Brief: This week, the filmmakers were all in the same country.
| Jayden | Japan | "Dear Sinea" | Ama | 0 |
| Kate | Japan | "Heaven is Filled with Femboys and Cross Dressers" | Otokonoko | 2 |
| William | Japan | "It's Just Content" | Manga by Issei Sagawa | 0 |
| Elliot | Japan | "Forgotten Osaka" | Nishinari | 3 |
| Lucinda | Japan | "Woman V Bidet" | Toilets in Japan | 2 |
| Mikaela | Japan | "Imitations" | Nagoro | 2 |
Judges: John Safran, Margaret Pomeranz, Jack Steele

Episode 6
| Contestant | Location | Film Title | Topic | Points |
|---|---|---|---|---|
| Jayden | Timor-Leste | "Grandfather Crocodile" | Lafaek Diak | 3 |
| Kate | Scotland | "A Very Relaxing Video" | Scottish Highlands | 1 |
| William | Chile | "The UFO Files" | Friendship Island | 2 |
| Elliot | Nepal | "The Gurkha Detox" | Gurkhas | 2 |
| Lucinda | Botswana | "Man or Elephant" | African bush elephant | 0 |
| Mikaela | Louisiana | "Control and Compel" | Witchcraft in Louisiana | 1 |
Judges: John Safran, David Michôd, Leigh Sales

Episode 7
| Contestant | Location | Film Title | Topic | Points |
|---|---|---|---|---|
| Jayden | India | "Two Days in Dharavi" | Dharavi | 3 |
| Kate | Mexico | "A Family Man" | Mini-Estrella | 2 |
| William | Maine | "Birds of a Feather" | Birdwatching | 0 |
| ~~Elliot~~ | ~~Azerbaijan~~ | ~~"For our Fathers"~~ | ~~People of Azerbaijan~~ | 0 |
| Lucinda | France | "Lucinda in Paris" | French fashion | 1 |
| Mikaela | Germany | "Bubbling" | LGBTQ culture in Berlin & far-right politics in Germany | 3 |
Judges: John Safran, Bruna Papandrea, Mark Coles Smith

Note: Elliot was disqualified as his video was submitted after the week's deadline.

Episode 8
Brief: This week, the filmmakers were tasked to immerse themselves in the culture of their country.
| Contestant | Location | Film Title | Topic | Points |
| Jayden | Jersey | "In the Deep End" | Open water swimming | 0 |
| Kate | Romania | "The Trouble with Being Born" | Legacy of Nicolae Ceaușescu | 3 |
| William | Madagascar | "Savika" | Savika | 5 |
| Elliot | The Bahamas | "Cat Island: The Simple Life" | People of Cat Island | 0 |
| Lucinda | Indonesia | "Entering Nirvana" | Wellness tourism in Indonesia | 1 |
| Mikaela | Argentina | "La Pachamama" | Pachamama | 0 |
Judges: John Safran, Todd Sampson, Nina Oyama

Episode 9
| Contestant | Location | Film Title | Topic | Points |
|---|---|---|---|---|
| Jayden | Jordan | "To My Future Self" | Bedouin | 1 |
| Kate | Utah | "Mr Wonderful's Atomic Bomb" | AI data centers | 1 |
| William | Turkey | "The Watchman of Antiquity" | Boncuklu Höyük | 0 |
| Elliot | Monaco | "Lost in Monaco" | People of Monaco & Self-Reflection | 2 |
| Lucinda | Lithuania | "Touch Grass" | Romuva | 3 |
| Mikaela | Canada | "An Ode to Keepers" | Lighthouse keepers | 2 |
Judges: John Safran, Lisa Millar, Nash Edgerton

Note: Jayden was pulled out of Jordan early after the 2026 Iran war ceasefire was called off. He completed his film based on the footage he had up to that point and presented it from South Africa.

Episode 10
Brief: For their final film, the filmmakers chose their location (prior to the race) and were tasked to make their “Dream Film”.
| Contestant | Location | Film Title | Topic | Points |
| Jayden | Senegal | "The Captain" | Illegal fishing in Africa & Immigration to Europe | 0 |
| Kate | China | "I Wish my Dad was Still Alive" | Filial piety | 3 |
| William | Vietnam | "Endurance" | Tarot card reading | 0 |
| Elliot | Brazil | "Holding the Line" | Favela | 3 |
| Lucinda | California | "Forever 35" | Anti-aging movement | 2 |
| Mikaela | Mongolia | "I Can't See It" | Buddhism in Mongolia | 4 |
Judges: John Safran, Olivia Rousset, Margaret Pomeranz, Danny Philippo

== Controversies ==
=== Gina Rinehart reference ===
During her film "A Very Relaxing Video", contestant Kate McGuiness portrayed a fictional scenario that involved a violent attack on Australian mining magnate Gina Rinehart. On July 23, Hancock Prospecting demanded the immediate removal of the video, a public apology, and a comprehensive investigation. On July 30, McGuiness issued an apology. On July 31, Hancock sent legal letters to the ABC Board who referred the film to the independent ABC Ombudsman.

== Legacy ==
Although receiving fairly high ratings for its timeslot, Race Around the World was a considerable logistical and financial drain on the publicly funded ABC. In 2000, the series, now entitled Race Around Oz, was restricted to the Australian continent because it was the Olympic year and the producers wished to focus on Australia.

A youth-oriented program titled Race Around the Corner was produced by ABC Children's Unit with students (14–16 years of age) making low-budget local productions in the same style as Race Around the World.

Host Richard Fidler later became a radio presenter and host of the Conversations radio show and podcast.

Most of the racers from the series went on to pursue careers in media and film-making:

- John Safran came last on the first series (won by Olivia Rousset), despite winning the popular vote, because he was disqualified after the first round, in which he submitted a film in which he had covertly filmed priests giving confession in Rio de Janeiro. Safran went on to produce and present several television programs, including John Safran's Music Jamboree and John Safran vs God for SBS, and John Safran's Race Relations for the ABC. He would return to the race for the 2026 reboot, as one of the judges.
- Olivia Rousset, Bentley Dean, and Kim Traill have worked as reporters for the SBS program Dateline.
- Olivia Rousset has won a Walkley Award for her video journalism.
- Bentley Dean was nominated for an Academy Award for Tanna.
- Kim Traill's book Red Square Blues: A Beginner's Guide to the Decline and Fall of the Soviet Union was published by HarperCollins in September 2009.
- Catherine Turner was a reporter with Al Jazeera, and later Seven News.
- Scott Herford has a film production company, and has produced several films.
- Tony Wilson went on to host the breakfast show on Melbourne radio station 3RRR, and has written a novel called Players (ISBN 1-920885-58-7).
- Ben Davies is the creator and producer of the Network Ten observational documentary series Bondi Rescue.

In March 2025, a reunion and retrospective special was produced on Australian Story, titled "The Shoot Out".

== See also ==
- The Amazing Race (American TV series)
  - The Amazing Race Australia
- Le Grand Raid Le Cap Terre de Feu
- Race Across the World
