= Michael Pavlich =

Australian radio producer and presenter

Michael Pavlich is an Australian radio producer and presenter with the Australian Broadcasting Corporation (ABC).

Pavlich first became known as the producer for Trevor Chappell's Overnights program from Monday to Thursday mornings, but increasingly became known as a presenter in his own right due to filling in for Chappell when he was not available. He is commonly nicknamed "Pav" by Chappell and by listeners to the program.

In July 2023, Pavlich replaced Chappell as host of Overnights from Monday to Thursday mornings. Chappell moved to host Afternoons on ABC Radio Melbourne but returned as presenter of the program in 2025. Pavlich is currently hosting Overnights from Friday to Sunday mornings.

Pavlich is also a musician, playing in the Melbourne-based band the Last Hotel. He is writing a novel and is related to the Australian rules footballer Matthew Pavlich. He is known to be interested in collecting vintage cereal box toys.
