= Elizabeth Bond =

Australian broadcaster (1942-2002)

- Born: 1942
- Died: December 2002 (aged 59–60)
- Education: University of Melbourne
- Occupations: Radio broadcaster, television presenter, journalist
- Employer: Australian Broadcasting Commission

Elizabeth Bond (1942 – December 2002) was an Australian radio broadcaster, TV host and journalist.

== Education ==
Bond graduated from the University of Melbourne in 1962 with a Bachelor of Arts with honours in English and German. Bond attended the university with Germaine Greer, whom Bond credited with teaching her how to apply make-up. While at the university, Bond appeared as an extra in a production of Saint Joan which starred Zoe Caldwell.

== Career ==
After a successful audition in December 1963, Bond commenced working for the Australian Broadcasting Commission in Melbourne, working in various capacities.

Bond relocated to Sydney in 1970 where she presented her own program on 2BL. The program was dropped after Bond attracted criticism for making controversial comments on the program following a discussion with social commentator Ray Taylor, angering ABC management, prompting protests and accusations of Bond being a "left wing libber on the ABC".

During this time, Bond appeared on ABC Television, hosting Matinee and At Home with Elizabeth Bond. However, Bond expressed the view that she didn't enjoy television work and said she had no desire of becoming a media personality.

Following a short-lived marriage and the birth of her son, Bond took a break from radio but returned to 3LO in 1977 to take over from Terry Lane on the Mornings program. Following an initial outcry immediately following Lane's departure, listeners warmed to Bond and she was able to command a large audience, covering topics such as national and international politics, business affairs and media analysis. Bond was explicit in her instructions to her producer to never be asked to help promote television shows, movies or books as they were a national broadcaster, and "not a PR company".

Following disagreements with management about proposed changes to her program, Bond resigned from the ABC at the end of 1979. Following her resignation, Bond accepted an offer to work for The Age.

In 1981, Bond was appointed as the first community relations officer at the Royal Women's Hospital in Melbourne.

Bond became the first female commissioner of the Liquor Control Commission, which was later renamed the Liquor Licensing Commission. Her work there prompted her to enroll in a law course at Melbourne University in 1989, which she graduated from in 1995.

Throughout the 1980s, Bond served in a number of roles including as a foundation board member of the Meat Market Craft Centre, as a chairperson of St Martins Youth Centre, as a member of the ethics committee at the Royal Southern Memorial Hospital and as advisory committee member with the ABC.

=== Recognition ===
In October 1979, Bond received a gold citation at the United Nations Association of Australia's media awards.

== Personal life ==
Bond suffered from rheumatoid arthritis from the age of 16. Because of this, she often used a wheelchair. In her final years at the ABC, she asked to be carried from her house to her car, and then from her car into the studio so she could continue working.

== Death ==
Bond died in December 2002. Her death prompted a number of tributes including from political commentator Max Teichmann.
