= Deborah Cameron =

Deborah Cameron may refer to:

- Deborah Cameron (radio presenter) (1958–2018), Australian journalist and radio presenter
- Deborah Cameron (linguist) (1958–2026), Oxford university professor and author
- Debbie Cameron (born 1958), American-Danish singer
