= Barry Ion =

Australian footballer and radio personality

Personal information
- Full name: Barry Vincent Ion
- Born: 9 October 1941 (age 85)
- Original team: Carlton Rovers
- Height: 178 cm (5 ft 10 in)
- Weight: 76 kg (168 lb)

Playing career^{1}
Years	Club	Games (Goals)
1961–1965	Footscray	40 (5)
- ^{1} Playing statistics correct to the end of 1965.

Barry Vincent Ion (born 9 October 1941) is a former Australian rules footballer and radio personality. He played with Footscray in the Victorian Football League (VFL), Yarraville in the Victorian Football Association (VFA), and Woodville in the South Australian National Football League (SANFL). He became a well known radio personality in Adelaide and Sydney.

Ion started in radio early, commentating football matches for Melbourne radio in 1960, while also playing with the Carlton Rovers. He joined his elder brother, Graham Ion, at Footscray in 1961 and played with him in the 1961 VFL Grand Final, as a half back flanker. The grand final was just his sixth league game, having played just four home and away matches before the finals series. He made 29 appearances over the next two seasons, but then struggled with injuries, playing just five more games.

In 1966 he joined Yarraville in the Victorian Football Association; he wasn't able to play Saturday games as he was calling football for radio station 3KZ, but he still polled sufficient votes to finish third in the J. J. Liston Trophy for the year. He moved to Adelaide in 1967 and spent two seasons playing for Woodville.

While in Adelaide, Ion began working for 5AD and formed a radio breakfast duo with Tony Pilkington called "Bazz and Pilko". They were the highest-rated radio show in Australia during the 1970s and early 1980s, commanding nearly 40% of the radio market in Adelaide. Ion voiced a character called "Peter Plus". He joined 5KA in 1983, where he continued to work with Pilkington. In 1985 the duo brought their breakfast show to Sydney station 2UW where they remained until late 1991.

== Discography ==
=== Studio albums ===
List of albums, with selected chart positions
Title	Album details	Peak chart positions
Title	Album details	AUS
Bazz & Pilko Classics (as Bazz & Pilko)	Released: December 1979; Format: LP; Label: Festival Records (L 37512)	64
Day Trip to Victor (as Bazz Plus Pilko)	Released: December 1980; Format: LP; Label: Festival Records (L 37520)	48
Plussy... Or Bust? (as Bazz & Pilko)	Released: December 1982; Format: LP; Label: Bee Pee Records (PLUS-101)	67

=== Compilation albums ===
List of compilation albums, with selected chart positions
Title	Album details	Peak chart positions
Title	Album details	AUS
Bazz & Pilko Classics Hits (as Bazz & Pilko)	Released: December 1989; Format: LP, CD, Cassette; Label: CBD Records (466122 4)	85

=== Singles ===
List of singles, with selected chart positions
Year	Title	Peak chart positions
Year	Title	AUS
1969	"Bazza Razza" / "Have a Giggle and Go- Ho!" (as Barry Ion, Peter Plus and The Coachmen)	90
1980	"Bite Your Bum" (as Bazz & Pilko)	37
1981	"Song for Don" (as Bazz & Pilko)	-
