= Klinger (band) =

Australian band

- Origin: Melbourne, Victoria, Australia
- Genre: Rock
- Years active: 1996–2003, 2014–present
- Past members: Dave Rogers; Shayne Adam; Ben Birchall; Darren Vlah; Heath Bernhardt; Glenn Arnup

Klinger are an Australian rock band from Melbourne, Victoria named after the character from M*A*S*H. Their "Sayonara Anyway" / "Ben Lee" single reached #22 on the ARIA Alternative singles chart. They had two songs in Triple J's Hottest 100 in 2000. They supported Green Day, Unwritten Law and Everclear and toured nationally. The band were one of several dozen to appear in the TISM music video "Thunderbirds Are Coming Out"

Klinger played their first show of over 10 years at the Northcote Social Club in Melbourne on Australia Day 2014.

== Discography ==
=== Albums ===
- Shooting for the Chorus (2014)

=== EPs ===
- No Manners, Nice Trousers (1996)
- I Like Your Spirit Kid (1997)
- Grimshaw Street (2000)

=== Singles ===
- "Sayonara Anyway" / "Ben Lee" (2000) - Shock
- "Acne & Peroxide" / "Geography" (2002)
