= Ben Birchall =

- Label: Cavalier

Ben Birchall is a musician based in Melbourne, Victoria. He was a member of Klinger until it broke up and then he went solo, releasing an ep, Year of the Monkey, in 2004. He formed Ben Birchall and the Corrections and they released an album, Last Ditch Brigade, in 2007. Between 2010 and 2012, he was a presenter on 3RRR's Breakfasters programme. Ben has recently been performing in a new band Duke Batavia which has been described as 'Pirate Pop'.

== Discography ==
- Year of the Monkey ep (2004) – Cavalier
- Last Ditch Brigade (2007) – Cavalier
