= Road Movies (TV series) =

Canadian television series

- Genre: Travel
- Based on: La Course destination monde
- Country of origin: Canada
- Original language: English
- No. of series: 1
- No. of episodes: 26

Production
- Production companies: CBC; Why Not Productions Inc.

Original release
- Network: CBC Television
- Release: 29 June 1992 – 11 January 1993

Road Movies is a Canadian travel television series that aired on CBC Television in 1992. The series sent eight young Canadians to locations throughout Canada, to create short reports on local life and culture for television broadcast.

The series was based on the Télévision de Radio-Canada series La Course destination monde, but dropped the competitive element from the original series to become effectively just a documentary newsmagazine.

== Participants ==
The videographers were Heather Barrett, Ngaire Blankenberg, Maureen Bradley, Pat Harrison, Eli Laliberte, Duncan McCue, David Ozier and Kam Rao. Three additional reporters — Katerina Cizek, Matt Gallagher and Howie Woo — were also named as "backup" videographers in the event that one or more members of the main team had to drop out during production, although none of them ultimately appeared on the show.

Bradley made a film during the series coming out as LGBTQ, becoming one of the first Canadian television personalities to come out in a Canadian non-fiction television series.

== Broadcast ==
The series premiered in June 1992. The original run of 26 episodes was scheduled to end in December, although due to various schedule changes and specials during the year the final episodes actually aired in January 1993. It was co-produced by the CBC and Why Not Productions Inc. The show was not renewed for a second season.

== Critical response ==
The series was often compared in the media to either a video version of a university or college student newspaper, or a more polished version of a community channel show. John Haslett Cuff of The Globe and Mail opined, however, that the show effectively just duplicated programs that other Canadian television networks were already airing, such as YTV's Street Noise and MuchMusic's Mike & Mike's Excellent X-Canada Adventures.

In a 1993 piece analyzing the contrast between the popular success of La Course destination monde and the failure of Road Movies, Ray Conlogue of The Globe and Mail asserted that Road Movies's lack of a competitive framework meant that the young filmmakers were not receiving any professional feedback on areas where their work may have needed to improve; the destinations being limited to Canada, where the Quebec series allowed filmmakers to travel around the world, meant that Road Movies was not matching the Quebec series as a window for learning about different world cultures; and Road Movies's directive to avoid the controversial or challenging topics that were commonplace on La Course meant that the reports on Road Movies were rarely much more than tourism booster videos or human interest profiles.

The series was a Gemini Award nominee for Best Youth Program or Series at the 7th Gemini Awards in 1993.
