= Ghost Empire (book) =

2016 book by Richard Fidler

- Author: Richard Fidler
- Language: English
- Subject: History, Constantinople
- Publisher: HarperCollins Australia
- Publication date: 2016
- Publication place: Australia
- Media type: Print (hardback)
- Pages: 492
- ISBN: 978-0733335259
- OCLC: 942532667

Ghost Empire is a 2016 book by Richard Fidler. It is about the history of Constantinople up to the conquest by the Ottoman Empire interspaced with the experiences of Fidler and his son who took a trip to Istanbul in 2014.

== Contents ==
Author's note
Timeline
Introduction

Radiant City
Rome to Byzantium
The Deep State
Persian Nightmares
Children of Ishmael
Uncreated Light
The Starlit Golden Bough
The Fourth Crusade
End of Days
A Thing Not of This World
The Artifice of Eternity

Acknowledgements
Endnotes
Bibliography
Images credits
Index

== Publication history ==
- 2016, Ghost Empire (492 pages), Australia, HarperCollins Australia ISBN 978-0733335259, hardback
- 2017, Ghost Empire: A Journey to the Legendary Constantinople (520 pages), USA, Pegasus Books ISBN 978-1681775111, hardback

== Reception ==
In a review of Ghost Empire, The Sydney Morning Herald wrote "Fidler is passionate about his subject and he knows it well. Though an amateur historian, the radio presenter and one-time comedy star handles this dauntingly complex material with dexterity.", noted "That's not to say there isn't a fair amount of breezy surface narration and a number of subjects that seem ticked off rather than explored.", and concluded "Fidler's story ... leaves its readers with a sense of faith in the renewing, illuminating, social powers of historical narrative."

The Canberra Times wrote "In the book, Fidler evokes the clash of civilisations, the fall of empires, the rise of Christianity and the knock-on effects throughout civilisation when Constantinople fell and became Istanbul. But he tells them in the context of sharing his discoveries with his son – a poignant chapter of family life." and The Australian called it an "extraordinarily ambitious book"

Les Carlyon named it one of his best reads of 2016.

Ghost Empire has also been reviewed by Kirkus Reviews. and Publishers Weekly,

It achieved the shortlists of the 2017 Australian Indie Book Award, and the 2017 Australian Booksellers Association Nielsen BookData Booksellers Choice Award.
