= Raymond J. Bartholomeuz =

Fictional comic character

Raymond J. Bartholomeuz (sometimes misspelled "Bartholomew") is a fictional comic character created and performed by Australian writer and comedian Brian Nankervis. Bartholomeuz is an earnest, sensitive modern poet prone to strange and rambling discourses. He made frequent appearances on the television variety show Hey Hey It's Saturday in the 1980s and 1990s. He used to be a teacher and, when he took a year off to travel, he worked as a waiter at a theatre restaurant called The Last Laugh.
