= Daniel Burt (comedian) =

Australian writer and comedian

- Occupation: Comedian

Daniel Burt is a writer and comedian from Australia, and co-host of morning radio program breakfasters on community radio station 3RRR.

== Biography ==
Early in his career, Burt presented programs on SYN and Channel 31, including Pluck, The Reviewers, Raucous, and 3 Day Growth.

In 2002, he won National TREV Campus Comedy Competition.

In 2005, Burt lived in New York where he interned as a writer for the Late Show with David Letterman. He spent all his savings and borrowed money from his parents just to get to New York for the interview.

He returned to Melbourne in 2006 and since then has written for skitHOUSE, The Glass House, The Sideshow, Good News Week, The Einstein Factor, National Bingo Night, Hole in the Wall, Taken Out, and The Biggest Loser. and The 7pm Project.

As a corporate speaker, he has entertained companies such as Vulcan Steel and BHP Billiton.

He has been a frequent columnist for The Age. and was a contributor to The Green Guide.

In 2007 he wrote and presented a series of art "isms" for Sunday Arts on the ABC.

Burt has acted in iSH media mobile comedy series Girl Friday and wrote and acted in The Three Day Growth, which received funding from the Australia Council, Australian Film Commission, and Film Victoria

He has also acted on stage in The Coming of Stork by David Williamson at the Melbourne International Comedy Festival

In August 2009, Burt collaborated with Catherine Deveny for 'An Evening Of Insight And Filth' a live comedy show at the Butterfly Club in South Melbourne. A cocktail was created their honour.

In 2010 his Melbourne Comedy Festival Show – Yes Man Syndrome was a sell out.

In August 2010 Andrew Bolt described him as apparently having "...the mark of a modern messiah".

Time Out online listed him as one of Melbourne's top 10 tweeters.

He performed his show 'Inspired by Mediocrity' at the 2012 Melbourne International Comedy Festival.

Burt has been a writer for The Weekly with Charlie Pickering
