= D. Rogers =

Australian musician based in Melbourne

- Also known as: Dave Rogers
- Years active: 1996–present
- Label: Popboomerang
- Formerly of: Klinger

Dave Rogers, known professionally as D. Rogers, is an Australian musician based in Melbourne. He was a member of Klinger until he left in 2003 and moved to Japan. While in Japan, working as an English teacher, he recorded two albums, the first being a friends-only release. He returned to Australia in 2007 and recorded a third solo album.

== Discography ==
- The 14th Turn (2004)
- 'Neath The Dark of Fuses Blown (2006)
- Sparks on the Tarmac (2007) – Popboomerang Records
- Natural Disasters (2010) – Popboomerang Records
- Kicking The Tracers (2013) – Crying Ninja Records
- An Undefined Number (2013) – Crying Ninja Records

== Production credits ==
- Slow Fades, Canyon Songs (EP, 2018)
- The Glorious North, Welcome to the Glorious North (Album, 2016)
- The Glorious North, Dang! (EP, 2015)
- The Glorious North, At the Bar with the Glorious North (EP, 2017)
- Tali, Cavewoman (Single, 2017)
- Second Prize, The Heel Turn (EP, 2018)
- The Barebones, Where Have All the Good Folk Gone? (Album, 2015)
