= Breakfasters =

- Genre: Breakfast radio
- Running time: 180 minutes (6:00 am – 9:00 am)
- Country of origin: Australia
- Language(s): English
- Home station: 3RRR
- Hosted by: Sarah Smith; Geraldine Hickey; Daniel Burt
- Original release: 1984
- Audio format: Stereophonic sound
- Opening theme: "People Everywhere (Still Alive)" by Khruangbin
- Website: www.rrr.org.au/explore/programs/breakfasters
- Podcast: www.rrr.org.au/explore/podcasts/breakfasters

Breakfasters is a long-running Australian breakfast radio show broadcast on 3RRR in Melbourne. First broadcast in 1984, the current presenting line-up of Sarah Smith, Geraldine Hickey and Daniel Burt commenced on 13 May 2019.

At launch, the program was presented by volunteers Chris Hatzis and Stratos Pavlis. In a departure from the station's usual freeform radio style, the program was more tightly presented and aimed at a broader audience than 3RRR's specialised music programming. Today, it is the station's flagship weekday program.

== Notable presenters ==
- Stratos Pavlis
- Chris Hatzis
- Denise Hylands
- Santo Cilauro
- Richard Neil
- Kate Langbroek
- Leaping Larry L
- James (The Hound Dog) Young
- Kate Paton
- Stuart Round
- Stephen Downes
- Dave O'Neil
- Julian Schiller
- Tony Moclair
- Chris Venville
- Marieke Hardy (Holly C)
- Michaela Boland
- John Safran
- Mark (Crackman) O'Toole
- Fee B-Squared (Fee Bamford-Bracher)
- Angus Sampson
- Tony Wilson
- Sam Pang
- Michael Williams
- Ben Birchall
- Tim Shiel
- Jess McGuire
- Steve Wide
- Sarah Smith
- Geraldine Hickey
- Jeff Sparrow
- Daniel Burt
- Nat Harris
- Monique Sebire

=== 2010–present ===
No	Presenters	From	To	Duration	Source
1	Fee B-Squared, Tim Shiel & Ben Birchall	1 February 2010	10 September 2010	221 days	
2	Fee B-Squared, Ben Birchall & Jess McGuire	24 January 2011	7 December 2012	1 year, 318 days	
3	Fee B-Squared, Lorin Clarke & Stew Farrell	4 March 2013	13 December 2013	284 days	
4	Jacinta Parsons, Lorin Clarke & Stew Farrell	3 February 2014	7 November 2014	277 days	
5	Steve Wide, Alicia Sometimes & Declan Fay	9 February 2015	11 May 2015	91 days	
6	Steve Wide, Alicia Sometimes & Josh Earl	6 June 2015	11 December 2015	188 days	
7	Sarah Smith, Geraldine Hickey & Jeff Sparrow	22 February 2016	10 May 2019	3 years, 77 days	
8	Sarah Smith, Geraldine Hickey & Daniel Burt	13 May 2019	present	5 years, 308 days	

== In popular culture ==
An excerpt from a May 1986 interview between Breakfasters hosts Chris Hatzis and Stratos Pavlis and Countdown presenter Molly Meldrum is featured in the song "Volare" by TISM.
