= La Course destination monde =

1988–1999 Canadian reality TV series

- Also known as: La Course des Amériques; La Course Amérique-Afrique; La Course Europe-Asie
- Genre: Reality competition; travel
- Presented by: Michel Désautels
- Country of origin: Canada
- Original language: French
- No. of series: 11

Production
- Production company: Société Radio-Canada

Original release
- Network: Télévision de Radio-Canada
- Release: 8 October 1988 – 11 April 1999

Related
- La Course autour du monde Le Grand Raid Le Cap Terre de Feu

La Course destination monde is a Canadian reality competition television series, which aired on Télévision de Radio-Canada from 1988 to 1999. The series was a filmmaking competition which sent young emerging filmmakers from Quebec around the world to make short films about their destinations, with prizes awarded at the conclusion of each season to the best films coming out of the competition.

The series was inspired by the prior French series La Course autour du monde (1976–1984) and its successor Le Grand Raid Le Cap Terre de Feu.

The show premiered in 1988 as La Course des Amériques, sending filmmakers to destinations in North and South America. The second season, La Course Amérique-Afrique, continued to highlight destinations in the Americas as well as opening to destinations in Africa, while the third season, La Course Europe-Asie, centred on destinations in Europe and Asia. From the fourth season onward, the show was titled La Course destination monde, and permitted filmmakers to travel to anywhere in the world.

Many of the participants in the series have gone on to noteworthy careers in Quebec's media and arts industries, although not all as film directors.

== Participants ==
=== 1988–1989 ===
- Prize winners: Catherine Fol (winner), Étienne de Massy (2nd), Nathalie Goulet (3rd)
- Other competitors: Romain Alarie, Claude Dallaire, Stéphane Laporte, Yves Munn, Allan Quinn

=== 1989–1990 ===
- Prize winners: Stéphane Drolet (winner), Marc Cayer (2nd), Anne-Marie Poulin (3rd)
- Other competitors: François Colas, François Dagenais, Hugues Dufour, André Gariépy, Jean-Robert Morin

=== 1990–1991 ===
- Prize winners: Denis Villeneuve (winner), Brigitte Nadeau (2nd), Patrick Masbourian (3rd)
- Other competitors: Sébastien Bage, Sabrina Berreghis, Bruno Boulianne, Karina Goma, Stéphane Thibault

=== 1991–1992 ===
- Prize winners: Marie-Claude Harvey (winner), Marc Forget (2nd), Sophie Lambert (3rd), Gérald Gilbert
- Other competitors: Jennifer Alleyn, Jacques Blondin, Sophia Borovchyk, Louis-Perpinan Huard

=== 1992–1993 ===
- Prize winner: Philippe Falardeau (winner), Patrick Demers (2nd), Manuel Foglia (3rd)
- Other competitors: Sophie Bolduc, Simon Dallaire, Pierre Deslandes, Violaine Gagnon, Marc Roberge

=== 1993–1994 ===
- Prize winners: Guy Nantel (winner), Marie-France Bojanowski (2nd), Catherine Rondeau (3rd)
- Other competitors: Marie-Julie Dallaire, Isabelle Leblanc, Chloé Mercier, Félix Nguyen, Stéphane Prévost

=== 1994–1995 ===
- Winners: François Prévost, Ricardo Trogi (joint 1st)
- Other competitors: Hugo Latulippe, Étienne Leblanc, Emmanuelle Morris Waters, François Parenteau, Brunhilde Pradier, Robert Victor

=== 1995–1996 ===
- Winner: Philippe Desrosiers
- Other competitors: Jean-François Coulombe, Patrick Brunette, Manon Dauphinais, Linda Lamarche, Stéphane Lapointe, Nathalie Martin, Marie-Noëlle Swiderski

=== 1996–1997 ===
- Martin Bourgault, Pascal Brouard, Anne-Marie Cadieux, Danic Champoux, Antoine Laprise, Judith Provencher d'Assylva, Pascal Sanchez, Alexis Turgeon

=== 1997–1998 ===
- Robin Aubert, Meissoon Azzaria, Dominic Desjardins, Nicolas Desrosiers, Yves-Christian Fournier, Myriam Fréchette, Robin McKenna, François Péloquin

=== 1998–1999 ===
- Prize winners: Maryse Legagneur (winner), Martin Fournier (2nd), Mélanie Tardif (3rd)
- Other competitors: Isabelle Boulanger, Nathalie Cloutier, Valérie Galarneau, Catherine-Isabelle Giasson, Frédéric Gieling

== Legacy ==
The series inspired the English Canadian series Road Movies, and the Australian series Race Around the World.

Ricardo Trogi's participation in the 1994–95 season of the series is dramatized in his 2024 film 1995, the fourth in his semi-autobiographical series of films starring Jean-Carl Boucher as a fictionalized version of Trogi.
