= John Kenneally (radio presenter) =

Australian radio personality

- Presenting career
- Show: FIVEaa Breakfast
- Station: FIVEaa
- Time slot: 6:00am-9:00am weekdays
- Style: Talk
- Country: Australia
- Previous show: Bald Brothers Breakfast Show
- Website: www.fiveaa.com.au/show_fiveaa-breakfast_21

John Kenneally is an Australian radio presenter based in Adelaide, who after many years on ABC radio, moved to commercial radio in 2010.

== Career ==
=== FIVEaa ===
Kenneally is currently part of talk station FIVEaa's breakfast team with Keith Conlon, Jane Doyle, Chris McDermott and Tim Ginever. He joined the station in late 2010 replacing the retiring Tony Pilkington. He left the breakfast shift in 2013 to present a Saturday night program on the station.

=== ABC 891 ===
Prior to joining FIVEaa, Kenneally co-presented ABC 891's Bald Brothers Breakfast Show with Tony McCarthy. He held a decade long partnership with McCarthy, originally as an evening presenter, with the duo presenting their final ABC 891 breakfast program on 16 November 2010, shortly before Kenneally began work at FIVEaa. He joined the station in January 1984, and in his earlier career he worked as a Music Director at 891 and produced for several on-air presenters, including his FIVEaa colleague Keith Conlon.
