= Le Grand Raid Le Cap Terre de Feu =

1984–1985 TV series

- Also known as: Le Grand Raid
- Genre: Game show; travel
- Created by: Jacques Antoine
- Written by: Jacques Antoine
- Directed by: Jean-Michel Boussaguet
- Presented by: Noël Mamère and Didier Regnier
- Countries of origin: France; Belgium; Switzerland; Canada; Luxembourg; Monaco
- Original language: French
- No. of series: 1

Production
- Producer: Jacques Antoine
- Running time: 60 minutes
- Production companies: Télé Union; CTF

Original release
- Network: Antenne 2; RTBF1; TSR 1; CBC Television; RTL Télévision; TMC
- Release: 1984 – 1985

Related
- Race Around the World

The Great Rallye (Cape of Good Hope / Tierra del Fuego) is a television game show produced by the Community of French televisions and aired in 1984 on Antenne 2 (France), RTBF1 (Belgium), TSR (Switzerland), CBC Television (Canada), RTL Télévision (Luxembourg) and TMC (Monaco).

This program was carried out following the success of La Course autour du monde (The Race around the world).

== Principle of the issue ==
Five two-men teams (one per channel), drove Citroen Visa cars for an extraordinary adventure, traveling around the world from the Cape of Good Hope to Tierra del Fuego, producing short TV documentary films that were noted by a professional jury based in Paris.

== Jury ==
The members of the standing jury representing television channels were:

- Sophie Hecquet (RTL Television)
- Bruno Albin (Antenna 2)
- Jean-Louis Boudou (Canadian Broadcasting Corporation)
- José Sacré (TMC)
- Vincent Philippe (TSR)

== Winners ==
- 1at – The RTL team (Belgium): 3,818 points
  - Participants: Thierry Devillet, Serge Goriely and Philippe Raymakers
- 2nd – The CBC team (Canada): 3,785 points
  - Participants: Robert Bourgoing and Francis Lévesque
- 3rd – The TMC team (Monte Carlo): 3,751 points
  - Participants: Christine Demond and Guilène Merland
- 4th – The SSR team (French Switzerland): 3,682 points
  - Participants: Alexandre Bochatay and Alain Margot
- 5th – The Antenne 2 team (France): 3,658 points
  - Participants: Laurent Chomel, Roland Théron and Georges Siciliano

== See also ==
- La Course destination monde
- Race Around the World
