= Lynne Haultain =

Australian radio presenter

- Occupation(s): senior executive, communications specialist, radio presenter
- Years active: 1988 to present
- Known for: hosting ABC Radio programs
- Notable work: Countrywide, The Law Report, Melbourne Breakfast

Lynne Haultain is an Australian communication specialist, senior executive and former radio presenter, arguably best known for her work at the Australian Broadcasting Corporation.

She began her radio career as a trainee broadcast officer at the ABC in Perth.

She transferred to ABC Radio Hobart in 1990 and presented Nights and Drive before moving to Melbourne in 1992 to present the national overnight program Beyond Midnight.

Nearly three years later Haultain took a role as senior reporter and presenter with ABC Rural, hosting Countrywide for Radio National.

In 1997, she presented The Law Report on ABC Radio National.

Haultain moved to ABC Local Radio to host the regional edition of Drive in Victoria before moving to 774 ABC Melbourne in 1998 where she presented Breakfast for more than four years.

While Haultain was on maternity leave in 2002, she was temporarily replaced by Red Symons. Symons later permanently succeeded Haultain as 774 ABC Melbourne's breakfast presenter in 2003. Haultain then presented Afternoons for two years before leaving 774 ABC Melbourne on 15 December 2004.

Haultain has gone on to a career with communications consultants CPR, then as inaugural General Manager of Strategic Communications at the ACCC and the City Of Melbourne. She is chair of the Board of Management at the Victorian Foundation for the Survivors of Torture, and a commissioner with the Victorian Law Reform Commission.

Haultain is married to ABC Radio Grandstand presenter Francis Leach. For a while she and her husband worked in the same timeslot on their respective stations, when Haultain presented 'Afternoons and Francis was at 1116 SEN.

Haultain returned to ABC Radio Melbourne in 2019 to co-host a special edition of The Conversation Hour with Jon Faine on 13 May 2019.
