= Lindy Burns =

Australian radio presenter

Lindy Burns is an Australian radio presenter.

== Career ==
Burns started in radio at 1233 ABC Newcastle co-presenting the Saturday morning sports program "All in the Game" she has been a sports commentator with Triple J and presenting the statewide Sunday Show in New South Wales.

Lindy's first full-time gig was presenting Drive on 1233 ABC Newcastle, where she stayed for five years. In September 2005, Burns moved to Melbourne to present Drive on 774 ABC Melbourne to replace Virginia Trioli who transferred to Sydney.

In December 2011, Burns finished presenting Drive on 774 ABC Melbourne after 6 years and moved to present Evenings in January 2012, replacing Derek Guille.

In October 2018, Burns announced her resignation from ABC Radio Melbourne, she has decided to return to her hometown of Newcastle to spend more time with her family. Lindy will also take on a new role with ABC Training.

== Personal life ==
Burns was born in Wollongong and raised in Newcastle, New South Wales. She has degrees in History and Drama from Newcastle University and Melbourne University and was once a professional basketballer.

Lindy is married to Peter Ritchie.
