= Vulture (talk show) =

Australian television talk show (2005)

Vulture is an Australian television chat show focused on the arts. It was broadcast by ABC in 2005. It was presented by Richard Fidler and produced by Guy Rundle, and featured a panel of guests who discussed art and culture. The program ceased broadcasting in November 2005.
