= Jacinta Parsons =

Australian radio broadcaster and writer

Jacinta Parsons is a radio broadcaster and writer from Melbourne, Australia who has worked at community radio station Triple R, and for the ABC at Double J, ABC Radio Melbourne, and ABC Radio National.

Parsons currently hosts the Friday Revue and Saturday Mornings on ABC Radio Melbourne.

== Radio ==
Parsons began broadcasting at community radio station Triple R in 2006 on the Australian music show, Local and/or General, which celebrated emerging local musicians. During her tenure at Triple R, she also hosted Dynamite, Detour, and Breakfasters.

In 2015, Parsons transitioned to the ABC, joining the Double J team as the music director for ABC Local Radio.

From January 2017 to December 2018, she co-hosted the Breakfast program on ABC Radio Melbourne with Sami Shah.

In January 2020, Parsons took over from Richelle Hunt as the host of ABC Radio Melbourne's Afternoon program and also co-hosted the Friday Revue with Brian Nankervis.

In July 2023, Parsons announced her decision to step away from hosting the Afternoon program to focus on other responsibilities, while continuing to host the Friday Revue.

In November 2024, ABC announced that Parsons would replace Alice Zaslavsky as the host of Saturday Mornings on ABC Radio Melbourne.

== Writing ==
Parsons released a memoir in September 2020, entitled Unseen. It explores living with Crohn's disease and chronic illness for over 20 years. Parsons released a non-fiction book in 2022, entitled A Question of Age. It is an examination of women and ageing.

== Life ==
Parsons was diagnosed with Crohn's disease in 1997. She is an ambassador for Crohn's and Colitis Australia, and an advocate for people with the disease.

Parsons is an active member of the music and arts community, and is a board member for Rollercoaster Theatre, a not-for-profit ensemble of trained actors with intellectual disabilities from a wide range of backgrounds.
