= Philip Clark (radio presenter) =

Australian radio presenter

- Occupations: journalist and radio broadcaster
- Years active: 1988-present
- Known for: hosting radio programs on ABC Radio and 2GB
- Notable work: Breakfast (2BL), Breakfast (2GB), Drive (2GB), Breakfast (666 ABC Canberra), Nightlife (ABC Local Radio)

Philip Clark (born May 1956) is an Australian radio presenter. He is best known for his work at the Australian Broadcasting Corporation and at Sydney commercial station 2GB.

Since 2016, he has hosted the Monday to Thursday editions of Nightlife on the ABC Local Radio network.

== Career ==
Clark was born in Launceston, Tasmania. He studied arts and law at the Australian National University in Canberra where he lived from 1974 to 1987. After graduating from university, Clark worked for Labor senator John Button during the Hawke government.

In 1986, Clark moved to Sydney where he practiced law with a major law firm. He then joined The Sydney Morning Herald in 1988 where he covered state politics and edited the newspaper's Stay in Touch column.

In 1991, Clark moved into radio, initially working on John Doyle's afternoon program on Sydney ABC station 2BL before taking over Evenings.

Clark was appointed host of Breakfast on 2BL in 1993.

He moved into commercial radio in 2001 when he moved over to 2GB, hosting the station's breakfast program before taking over the afternoon drive program in 2002.

In 2005, Clark was scrutinised by ABC TV's Media Watch program when they investigated why 2GB was providing the Corby family with so much favourable coverage during the Schapelle Corby case. The program analysed how the station was able to gain so much direct access to the Corby family when other media outlets weren't able to, which was illustrated by Clark interviewing Mercedes Corby on his drive program on 15 April 2005.

After seven years of hosting drive, Clark was moved to 2GB's evening program in early 2009. However, he was let go from the station just five months later.

In 2014, Clark rejoined the ABC when he took over from Ross Solly as host of Breakfast on 666 ABC Canberra. Clark hosted the program for almost three years before he was named as one of Tony Delroy's successors on ABC Local Radio's national late night program Nightlife in late 2016. Clark was announced as the new host of the Monday to Thursday editions of the program, while Sarah MacDonald was named as the Friday to Sunday presenter as the show took on a new 7-day format.

Clark has also worked in television, having hosted more than 170 episodes of ABC TV's quiz show Flashback in 2000, and having been a regular guest on Meet the Press and Sunrise. In 1996, he was also the first person to host the annual Andrew Olle Media Lecture which was delivered that year by David Williamson.
