= Brian Nankervis =

Australian comedian

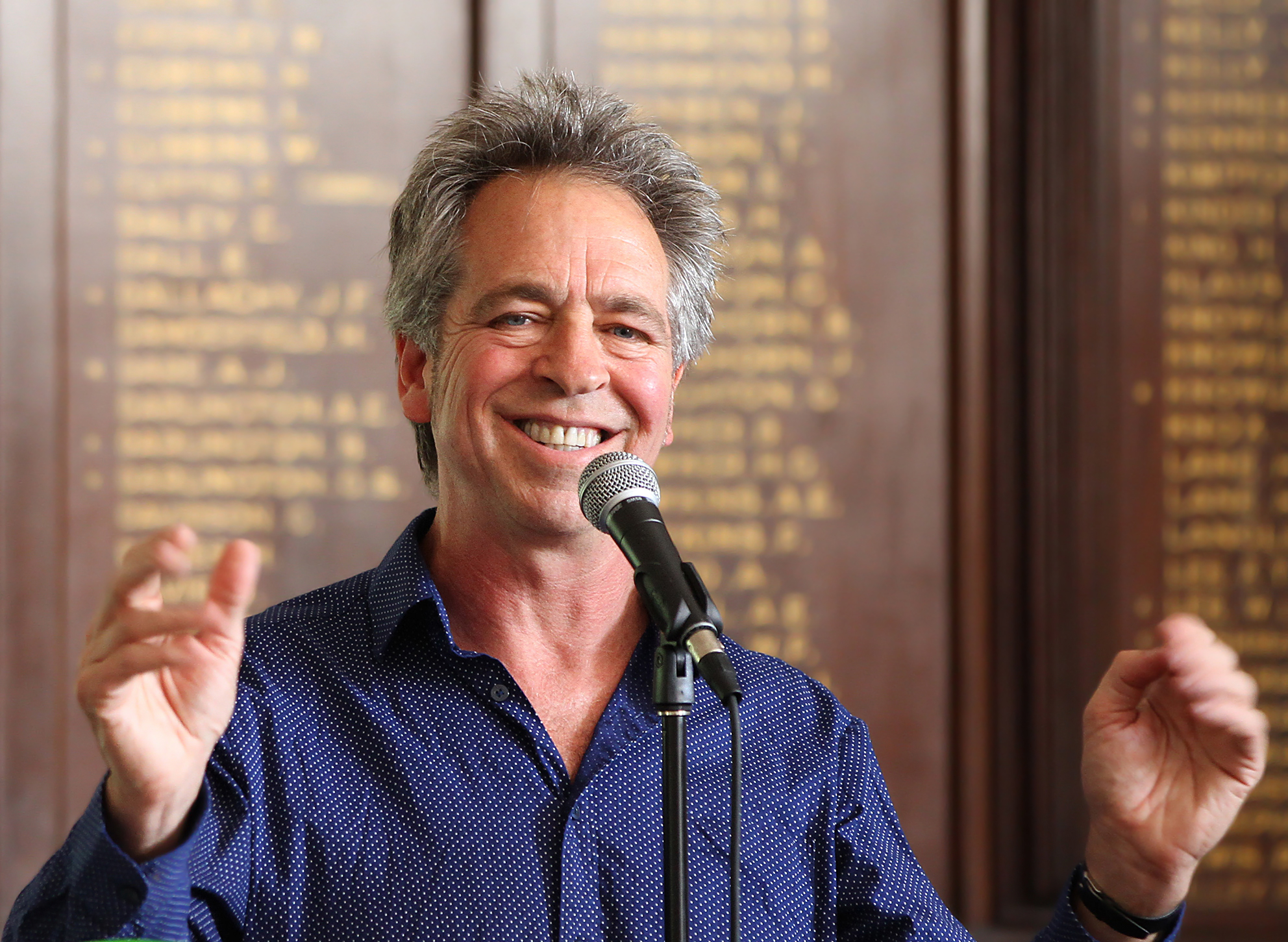
- Nankervis during a live performance in 2011
- Born: 1956 (age 69–70); Melbourne, Australia
- Notable work: Hey Hey It's Saturday (as Raymond J. Bartholomeuz), RocKwiz, The Friday Revue on ABC Radio
- Spouse: Sue Thomson
- Children: 3

Comedy career
- Genres: Television, comedy, radio, theatre

Brian Nankervis (born 1956) is an Australian writer, actor, radio host, television producer, and comedian. He is one of the co-creators of the RocKwiz television music quiz show and co-hosts The Friday Revue with Jacinta Parsons on ABC Radio Melbourne.

== Early life ==
Brian Nankervis was born in Melbourne, Victoria, in 1956.

== Career ==
Nankervis started a job as a waiter in 1985 at a Melbourne theatre restaurant, The Last Laugh. It discovered comedians and performers such as Lynda Gibson, Jane Turner, Peter Moon and Richard Stubbs.

Nankervis' character, Raymond J. Bartholomeuz, an eccentric beat poet was popular during the 1980s and 1990s in regular television appearances on Hey Hey It's Saturday. As Bartholomeuz, Nankervis also appeared weekly on Paul Hester's ABCTV series Hessie's Shed (1998–99) and in Bob Franklin's sitcom Introducing Gary Petty (2000).

Nankervis played the role of Dr Ray Good in the stage and TV versions of Let The Blood Run Free (TV series: 1990–92) and appeared in the ensemble cast of the sketch comedy series Jimeoin (1994–95).

He frequently appeared as himself on television and stage and was the regular warmup man and audience wrangler for The Panel and Thank God You're Here (2006–2009).

In 2005, Nankervis co-created the SBS music quiz game show RocKwiz (2005–2016), which he also appears in as adjudicator and co-host alongside Julia Zemiro, as well as co-writing the scripts and co-producing the show. RocKwiz was filmed in front of a live audience in the Gershwin Room at St Kilda's Esplanade Hotel, however a stage version of the show often tours around Australia and festivals. Nankervis is responsible for a thorough pre-show quiz which ends with him selecting the members who will appear on the team panels alongside the night's celebrity.

Nankervis continues to work with his partner, Sue Thomson, and has co-produced some of her documentaries, ABC's Boys and Balls starring Roy and HG, Ted Whitten, and Ron Barassi (1994), Network Ten's Class Clowns for the Melbourne International Comedy Festival and Tempest at the Drop In (2015).

=== ABC Radio Melbourne ===
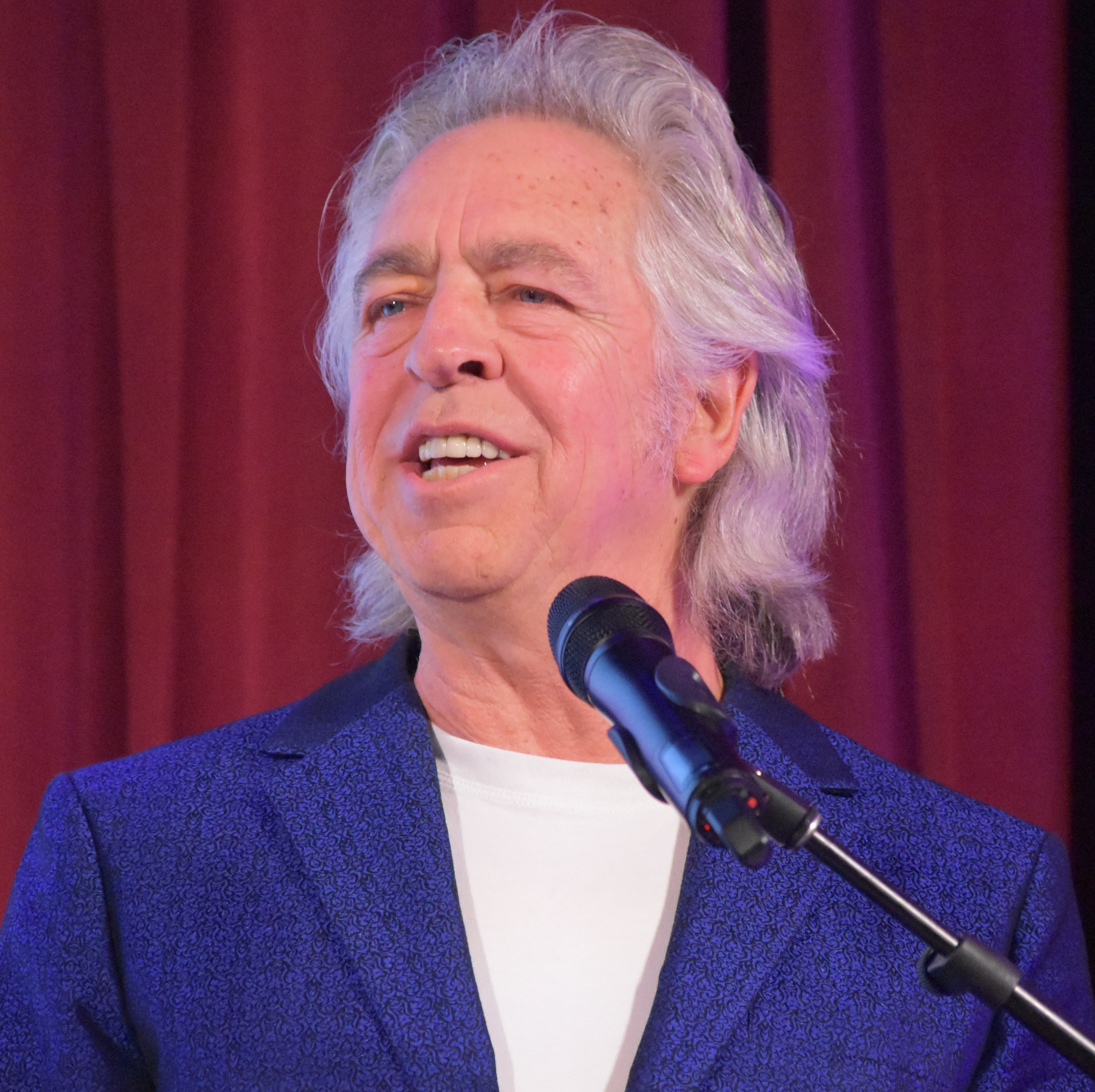
Nankervis in 2025 at the Queenscliffe Literary Festival

Nankervis began hosting The Friday Revue on ABC Radio Melbourne from its inception in 2016.

Nankervis hosted Songs and Stories on ABC Radio from 2021 to 2023. The show included two special guests to curate a playlist and discuss the significance of the songs in their life.

In November 2024, ABC announced that Nankervis would be hosting Saturday Mornings on ABC Radio Melbourne, replacing Matt Preston.
