= Tony Pilkington =

South Australian radio personality

- Born: 31 October 1943 (age 83); Adelaide, South Australia, Australia
- Other name: Pilko
- Occupations: Radio presenter, media personality
- Years active: 1970–2022

Tony Pilkington (born 31 October 1943) is a South Australian radio personality. He is best known for "Bazz and Pilko", his long running breakfast show partnership with Barry Ion. Their show aired in Adelaide from 1976 to 1984, then Sydney from 1985 to 1991, then back in Adelaide until 1996. He continued to work at Adelaide's 5AA until retiring in 2010.

In 2011 he was inducted into the Australian Commercial Radio Hall of Fame.

After nine years of semi-retirement, Pilko is set for a return to Adelaide airwaves once again. As of 2020 Pilkington will host the afternoon show, 12:30 to 3pm weekdays on Adelaide's 5AA. In December 2022, Tony again retired from Adelaide Radio.

== Discography ==
=== Studio albums ===
List of albums, with selected chart positions
Title	Album details	Peak chart positions
Title	Album details	AUS
Bazz & Pilko Classics (as Bazz & Pilko)	Released: December 1979; Format: LP; Label: Festival Records (L 37512)	64
Day Trip to Victor (as Bazz Plus Pilko)	Released: December 1980; Format: LP; Label: Festival Records (L 37520)	48
Plussy... Or Bust? (as Bazz & Pilko)	Released: December 1982; Format: LP; Label: Bee Pee Records (PLUS-101)	67

=== Compilation albums ===
List of compilation albums, with selected chart positions
Title	Album details	Peak chart positions
Title	Album details	AUS
Bazz & Pilko Classics Hits (as Bazz & Pilko)	Released: December 1989; Format: LP, CD, Cassette; Label: CBD Records (466122 4)	85

=== Singles ===
List of singles, with selected chart positions
Year	Title	Peak chart positions
Year	Title	AUS
1980	"Bite Your Bum" (as Bazz & Pilko)	37
1981	"Song for Don" (as Bazz & Pilko)	-
