= Deborah Cameron (radio presenter) =

Australian journalist (1958–2018)

Deborah Anne Cameron (1958 – 9 June 2018) was an Australian journalist and radio presenter based in Sydney. In January 2008, she took over from Virginia Trioli as host of the morning program on ABC Radio Sydney.

Cameron began her career at The Warrnambool Standard, and in 1985 joined the Fairfax group, working at The Canberra Times and later The Sydney Morning Herald. She was a correspondent in New York and Tokyo, and lived in Jakarta for five years, while working as a senior journalist for The Sydney Morning Herald.

Her husband is Greg Earl, Asia Pacific editor of The Australian Financial Review. They have two children and live in Sydney.

In November 2011, Cameron announced her contract had not been renewed, and that she was leaving ABC Radio Sydney after four years with the station to pursue "fresh challenges".
