= Richard Fidler =

Australian radio and television presenter, musician and comedian

Richard Fidler FAHA
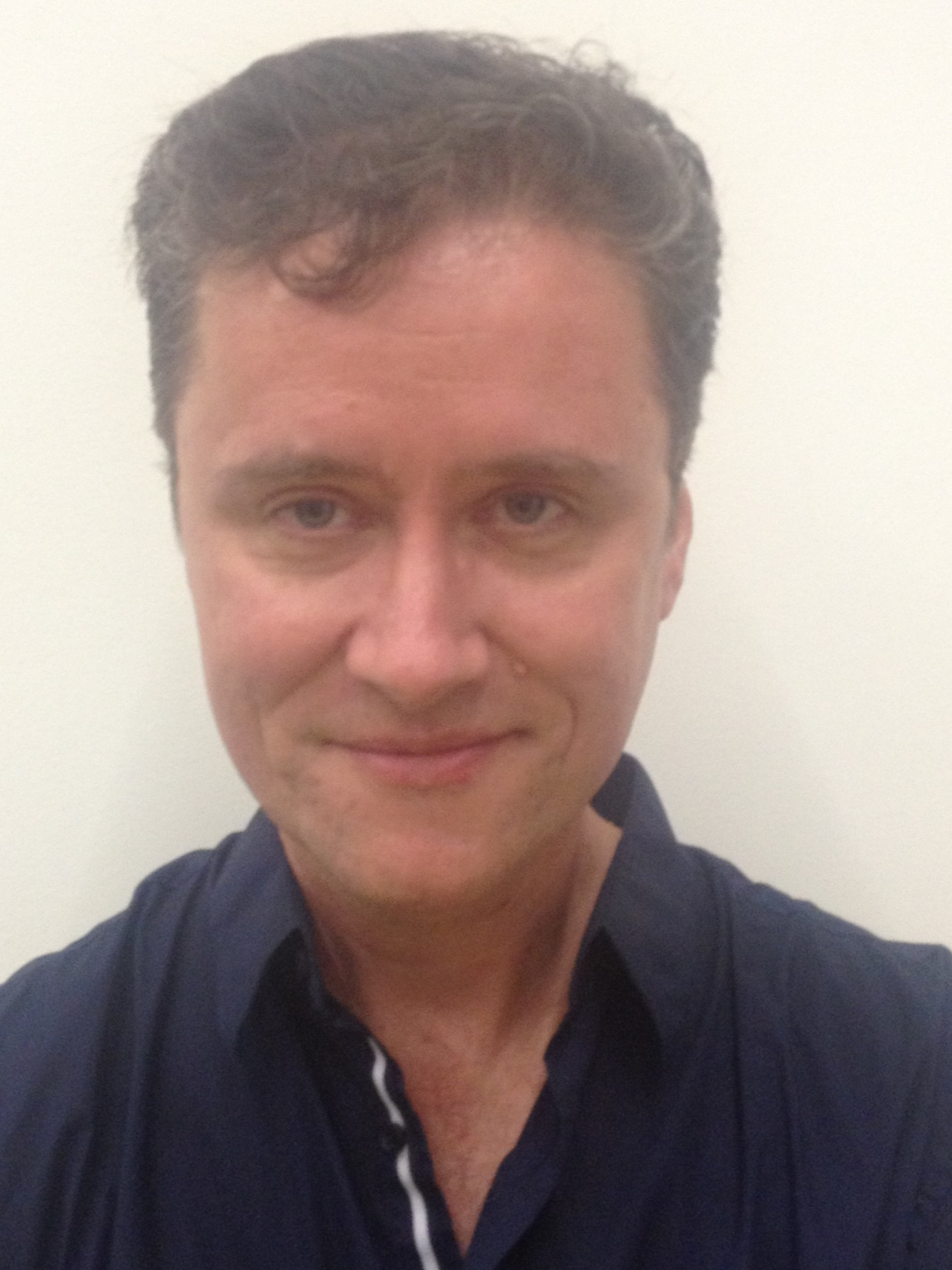
- Fidler in 2013
- Spouse: Khym Lam
- Children: 2
- Website: richard-fidler.com/

Richard Fidler is an Australian radio presenter and writer. He hosts an hour-long interview program, Conversations on ABC Local Radio and was a member of the Australian comedy group the Doug Anthony All Stars. Conversations consists of in-depth interviews with local and international guests from all walks of life.

== Career ==
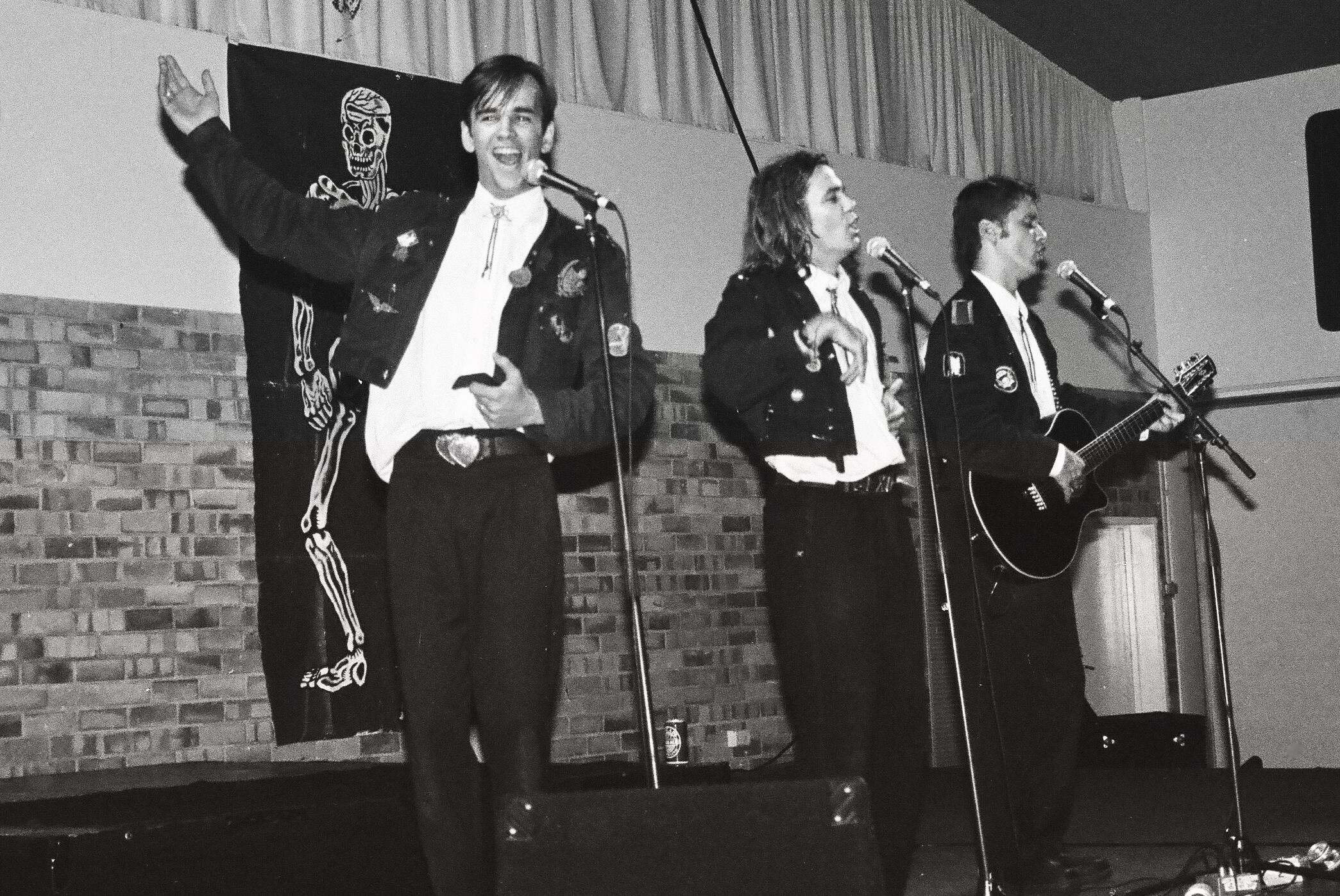
Fidler (right, holding guitar) performing with Tim Ferguson and Paul McDermott as the Doug Anthony All Stars

Fidler came to prominence in the 1980s as a member of the Doug Anthony All Stars (DAAS), an Australian musical comedy group also comprising Tim Ferguson and Paul McDermott. The guitar Fidler used often during his time with the DAAS was a black Yamaha APX 9-12 tuned to D standard; however he did use a metallic green 6 string acoustic in standard tuning in a couple of songs on Live at the National Theatre (New York) and used a generic electric guitar in a cover of "Anarchy in the U.K." on The Big Gig. That guitar was in standard tuning. On DAAS Icon, the bulk of the album was recorded with an electric guitar in standard tuning; however, some songs featured the APX 9-12. The group disbanded in 1994.

Fidler began his broadcast career on TV and presented shows including Race Around the World, Aftershock, Mouthing Off and Vulture.

In 2001, he was elected to the national committee of the Australian Republican Movement and was the chair of their Constitutional Issues committee. He resigned from these positions in 2007.

In 2005, Fidler moved to Brisbane, Queensland, to host the 7pm to 10pm shift on ABC Local Radio station 612 ABC Brisbane. The following year, he took on the newly configured 11am to 3pm shift on 612 ABC. The first hour, a long-form interview program known as Conversations, was also heard on 702 ABC Sydney. Since 2012 Fidler has focused solely on Conversations. '

Conversations is broadcast each weekday on ABC Local Radio in all Australian states except Victoria, and on ABC Radio National. It has over many years been one of the top five most downloaded podcasts in Australia, according to iTunes charts. In 2018, the program's name changed to Conversations and former Radio National arts journalist Sarah Kanowski joined Fidler as a regular host. The two presenters share duties, with Fidler usually presenting on Monday to Wednesday and Kanowski on Thursday and Friday.

In 2011, Fidler was awarded a Churchill Fellowship to investigate new forms of public radio in the United States and the United Kingdom.

Saga Land, written with Kári Gíslason (ABC Books, 2019) was shortlisted for the NSW Premier's Literary Awards, Douglas Stewart Prize for non-Fiction.

Fidler is the immediate past-president of Brisbane's Institute of Modern Art (IMA) and a member of its board of directors.

The Golden Maze: A Biography of Prague was shortlisted for the General Nonfiction book of the year at the 2021 Australian Book Industry Awards. The Book of Roads and Kingdoms won the Nonfiction prize at the 2023 Indie Book Awards.

Fidler was elected an Honorary Fellow of the Australian Academy of the Humanities in 2026.

== Personal life ==
Fidler is married to Khym Lam and they have two children.

== Published works ==
- Fidler, Richard; Ferguson, Tim; McDermott, Paul (1989). DAAS Book. Allen & Unwin/Haynes. ISBN 9780044421108.
- Fidler, Richard; Ferguson, Tim; McDermott, Paul (1992). DAAS Kapital. Allen & Unwin/Haynes. ISBN 9781863731010.
- Fidler, Richard; Jack, the Insider; Hoysted, Peter (2007). The Insider's Guide to Power in Australia. Random House Australia. ISBN 9781741666892.
- Fidler, Richard (2016). Ghost Empire. ABC Books. ISBN 9780733335259.
- Fidler, Richard; Gíslason, Kári (2017). Saga Land. HarperCollins Publishers Australia. ISBN 9780733338236.
- Fidler, Richard (2020). The Golden Maze: A Biography of Prague. ABC Books. ISBN 9780733335266.
- Fidler, Richard (2022). The Book of Roads and Kingdoms. ABC Books. ISBN 9780733342592.

== Appearances ==
Fidler was scheduled to appear in two events at the 2017 Brisbane Writers Festival in Brisbane, Queensland, Australia.

Fidler was also the presenter of the annual 2018 Seymour Biography Lecture at the National Library of Australia, speaking to the topic "Telling and writing the story".
