= Nightlife (radio program) =

Australian late-night radio talk show

Logo as of 2025

Nightlife is an Australian late-night talkback show across ABC Local Radio hosted by Philip Clark (Monday to Thursday) and Suzanne Hill (Friday to Sunday). It offers a mix of both news and current affairs, lifestyle and entertainment. Each night there are regular features and guests. The listening audience is featured throughout the program.

Nightlife is broadcast from 10.05 pm to 2.00 am (AEST) on ABC Local Radio across Australia and is followed by Overnights.

== Hosts ==
Weekday (Mon–Thu)

Host	Tenure	Notes
Tony Delroy	1990 – 2 September 2016	Retired after 26 years.
Dominic Knight	July – October 2016	Interim host.
Philip Clark	November 2016 – present	

Weekend (Fri–Sun)

Host	Tenure	Notes
Sarah MacDonald	November 2016 – 8 December 2019	Left to host ABC Radio Sydney Evenings.
Indira Naidoo	7 February 2020 – December 2022	Later moved to ABC Radio Sydney Evenings (2023).
Suzanne Hill	2023 – present	

In July 2016, Tony Delroy announced that he would be retiring from the show after 26 years as host. He hosted his last show on 2 September 2016. Dominic Knight then hosted the show until October 2016.

In September 2016, ABC announced that Philip Clark from 666 ABC Canberra would be hosting Nightlife. In November 2016, ABC confirmed that Clark would host the show from Monday to Thursday and Sarah MacDonald from Friday to Sunday.

In December 2019, ABC announced that MacDonald would be hosting Evenings on ABC Radio Sydney from January 2020. She hosted her last show on 8 December 2019.

In January 2020, ABC announced that Indira Naidoo would replace MacDonald and host the show from Friday to Sunday from Friday, 7 February. In December 2022, ABC announced that Naidoo would replace MacDonald as host of Evenings on ABC Radio Sydney from January 2023. Suzanne Hill replaced Naidoo.

== History ==
In November 2016, ABC announced that Nightlife would move to a seven-day format. This decision was met with criticism from within Australian country music circles and from Australian religious leaders as the new seven-day format prompted the ABC to remove the long-running Saturday Night Country from metropolitan ABC stations and to completely axe the Sunday Nights religious and ethics program usually hosted by John Cleary.

== Segments ==
The show has a guest in the first hour, including a large portion of time for audience talkback. The second hour also has guests, but without any talkback. The third hour has a talkback quiz, called The Mighty Challenge, while the fourth hour usually has another chance for audience talkback in a segment called Issue of the Day.

In 2007, the popular Not the Nightly News segment was discontinued.
