= Tony Delroy =

Australian radio presenter

- Born: Anthony Eric Delroy; 1 January 1953 (age 72–73)
- Presenting career
- Show: Nightlife (1987–2016)
- Station: ABC Local Radio
- Network: Australian Broadcasting Corporation
- Country: Australia

Anthony Eric Delroy (born 1 January 1953) is a retired Australian radio presenter. Delroy hosted ABC Local Radio's late-night talkback show Nightlife from 1987 to 2016 when he retired.

== Background and career ==
Delroy commenced working in news radio on Sydney station 2SM while completing his schooling. He joined the Australian Broadcasting Corporation and worked on-air in Bathurst while studying journalism. After a short stint in Launceston, Delroy was appointed news director of 2UE. In 1987, he joined 702 ABC Sydney and soon took over the Nightlife program, at a period when broadcasts used to end about midnight or 1:00 am. In 1990 the program went national and the ABC replaced the state-based late night programming with the national show, a mix of talkback, current affairs and light entertainment, the highlight for some being a 25-question quiz.

The show's success as ABC Local Radio's highest rating weekday program was bolstered by a team of experts who are featured every week to discuss such topics as motoring, literature, movies, American politics, finance, superannuation and travel destinations. In a minor 2010 incident, Delroy received an official reprimand after he used abusive language at a security guard who asked Delroy to remove his car from the space reserved for Maurice Newman, the chairman of the ABC.

Delroy has a cat named Barbara, who was mentioned during his broadcasts, along with his fondness for rugby league football and horse racing.

Delroy retired on 2 September 2016, after 26 years hosting Nightlife and 30 years with the ABC.
