= Trevor Chappell (radio presenter) =

Australian radio presenter (born 1961)

- Born: 6 April 1961 (age 65); Western Australia, Australia
- Occupation: Radio presenter
- Years active: 2000–present

Trevor Chappell (born 6 April 1961) is an Australian local radio presenter

Chappell was a presenter of the ABC Overnights program, broadcast nationally from 2:00 am (AEST) to 6:00 am (or 5:30 am on some stations) on Monday, Tuesday, Wednesday and Thursday mornings. During his tenure, he was joined by a variety of regular guests each night. He finished presenting Overnights in July 2026 after a 26‑year run.

== Early life ==
Chappell was born on 6 April 1961 in Western Australia. After completing high school, he worked in a range of different jobs - including as a miner, wheat bins in the far north-west, and as a builder's labourer.

When he turned 21, Chappell moved to Victoria, where he studied teaching and then moved into youth work. Three years later, he enrolled in an acting course at the National Theatre, Melbourne.

After encountering difficulties pursuing a career in acting, he moved back to Western Australia, choosing to study broadcasting at the Western Australian Academy of Performing Arts (WAAPA).

== Career ==
=== 1995–2000: Early radio career ===
Chappell attained his first job in radio working as a producer for 6PR in Perth, before moving back to Melbourne in 1995 in order to work as a casual producer at the ABC.

Chappell later produced programs for 774 AM Melbourne and for several Victorian regional radio stations.

=== 2003–2026: Host of Overnights & Afternoons ===
Chappell was the long‑time host of the Overnights program, broadcast Australia‑wide on Monday to Thursday mornings (with Rod Quinn hosting Friday, Saturday and Sunday mornings) from 2:00 am to 6:00 am AEST (midnight to 4:00 am AWST).

The program featured a “How, When, Where, Why” quiz on minutiae of pop culture — television, popular music, movies, comic books and more — which stimulated discussions within that framework, with only occasional excursions into real‑life events. Regular guests included Scott Goodings (television). The light‑hearted atmosphere typically shifted in the second half of the program, when adult subjects were discussed at a more mature level, with guest interviewees and talkback callers featuring heavily. An overwhelming proportion of callers, or at least those who went to air, were male, many identifying themselves as truck drivers.

The program could be heard live on the ABC’s Internet service and was available online for seven days. Chappell had listeners in Monterrey (Mexico), Portland (Oregon), Cheung Chau (Hong Kong), Tokyo (Japan), Denver (Colorado) and Vancouver (BC). Some callers during the quiz said that Chappell did not give clues, whereas the technical operator and second host, Michael Pavlich, became known as a “massive clue giver”.

In July 2023, ABC announced that Chappell would host Afternoons on ABC Radio Melbourne after 23 years at the helm of Overnights. In November 2024, ABC announced that Chappell would return to host Overnights. He concluded his tenure on the program in July 2026 after a 26‑year run. Francis Leach replaced him.

== Personal life ==
Chappell is married to his wife Cath. He has a son, Finn, from a previous marriage.

=== Interests ===
Chappell enjoys surfing, golf and going to the beach.

He is known for his dislike of the Beatles and his recall of the TV shows Owly's School, F Troop and popular Perth children's TV characters Fat Cat and Percy Penguin.

He is also an ABBA fan, and a fan of Bjorn; and he is an aficionado of Lapsang Souchong tea.

== Awards and nominations ==
=== ABC Local Radio Awards ===
Year	Nominee / work	Award	Result	Ref.
2002	Himself	Best New Talent	Won	
2004	Himself / Overnights	Networked Program of the Year	Won	
2005	Himself / Overnights	Networked Program of the Year	Won	
2006	Himself / Overnights	Networked Program of the Year	Won	
