= Derek Guille =

Australian radio presenter (born 1951)

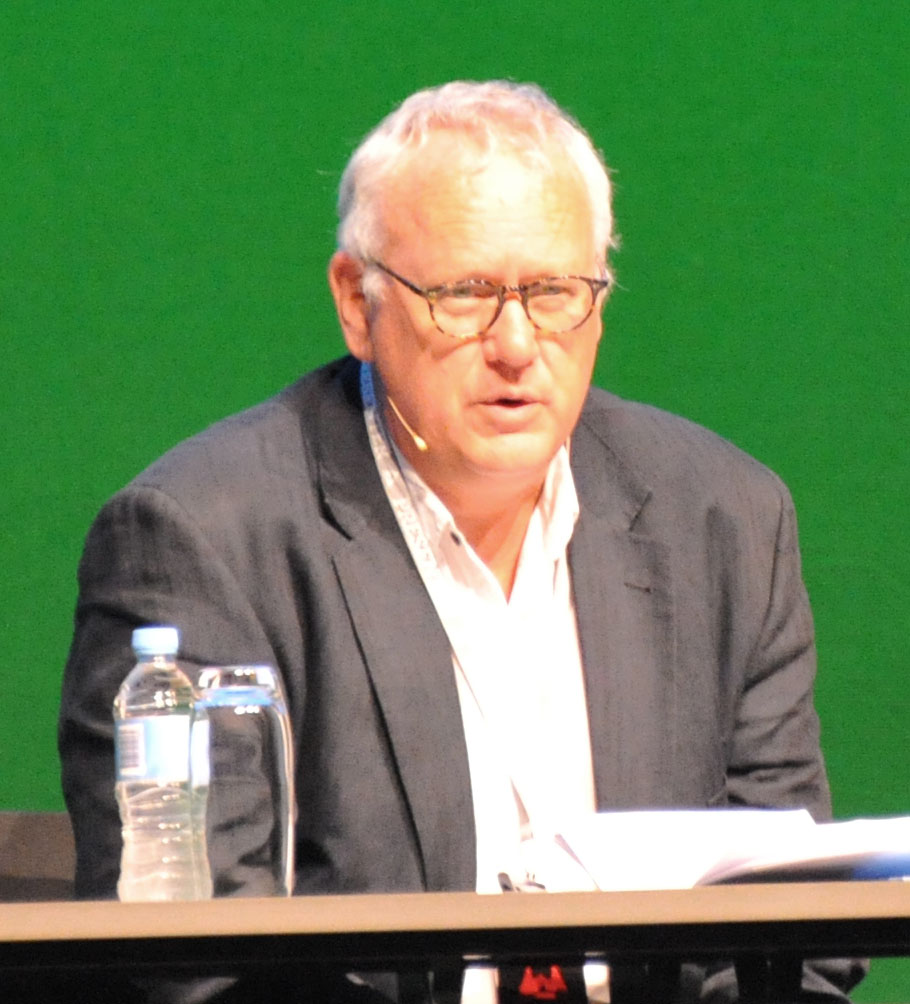
Chairing a discussion panel at the 2012 Global Atheist Convention

Derek Guille (Note: Pronounced /ɡɪl/ GHIL) (born 1951) is an Australian radio presenter. He presented the Evenings program on 774 ABC Melbourne and ABC Victoria from 2003 to 2011. He grew up in Dandenong and attended Dandenong Primary School.

== Career ==
Before beginning his radio career, Guille worked for the Nine Network and Batman Records and also travelled overseas where he worked as a music journalist, silkscreen printer and photographer. He fulfilled his childhood ambition when he began his radio career with 3HA in Hamilton in 1984. In 1987 he joined the Australian Broadcasting Corporation (ABC) at the Horsham studios of 3WV/WL, presenting the local current affairs morning program before moving to the breakfast shift and regional manager. With the creation of the ABC's Bendigo studios in 1993, he moved to central Victoria to take up the challenge of building an audience for that new station as the breakfast program presenter and station manager.

After spending three years presenting the statewide afternoon program on 774 ABC Melbourne and ABC Local Radio throughout Victoria and southern New South Wales, in 2003 Guille took over the reins of the Evenings program for Victoria. While the program was typical for ABC Local Radio, with a wide range of subjects covered by talkback or interviewed guests, his programs regularly featured live performances by musicians from Australia as well, as well as touring international artists. Early in 2011, k.d. lang and the Siss Boom Bang performed a set live to air with an audience made up of 400 ABC listeners who had won tickets to attend.

In June 2011, Guille announced that he would be leaving the program and the ABC. He presented his final show on 22 September 2011 and is now working as a freelance MC and interviewer. In April 2013, he released a book for younger readers called The Promise and published by One Day Hill. It is based on his visit to Villers-Bretonneux while covering the Melbourne Symphony Orchestra's tour of Europe in 2007 for ABC Radio. The Promise is illustrated by Melbourne street artist Kaff-eine.

In October 2018, Guille became the acting Breakfast presenter on ABC Central Victoria based in Bendigo while the usual presenter, Fiona Parker, was on long-service leave. In November 2021 he began as a volunteer on community radio station KLFM, presenting Breakfast on Tuesday and Wednesday morning until November 2023.

== Personal life ==
Guille plays guitar, ukulele and kazoo with varying degrees of proficiency and sings with a sort of jug band called the Ugly Uncles. His passion for music and live performance is often extended with his regular visits, as a performer or compere, at festivals such as the Port Fairy Folk Festival and the Queenscliff Music Festival. He also enjoys reading (from the widest range of genres but especially comic fiction) and theatre and has an appreciation for fine wine and food. Married in 1974, he and his wife Barbara have two children and five grandchildren.
