= Greater Cairo Markets =

Greater Cairo comprises a wide array of renowned popular and commercial markets that cater to various groups, from merchants seeking wholesale quantities to millions of ordinary consumers, including residents of Greater Cairo, visitors, and tourists. These markets are distinguished by the abundance and diversity of displayed goods and their high reputation for competitive prices, covering all kinds of merchandise such as household items, foodstuffs, ready-made clothing, electronics, antiques, industrial safety supplies, agricultural products, and other varied goods and services.

== Market Categories and Types ==
=== Household Goods Markets ===
Among the most famous household goods markets in Greater Cairo are:

Al-Moski Market – Overlooking Port Said Street, it hosts thousands of shops selling furnishings and household supplies at wholesale prices.

Darb Sa’ada – Located behind the Girls’ Mousqe (Gameaa El-Banat) and the Azhar Garage, extending through alleyways with hundreds of household supply shops.

Hamam El-Talat Market – Situated in the Bayn al-Sourayn area of Bab al-Sha’riya, with hundreds of furnishing shops.

=== Antiques and Artwork Markets ===
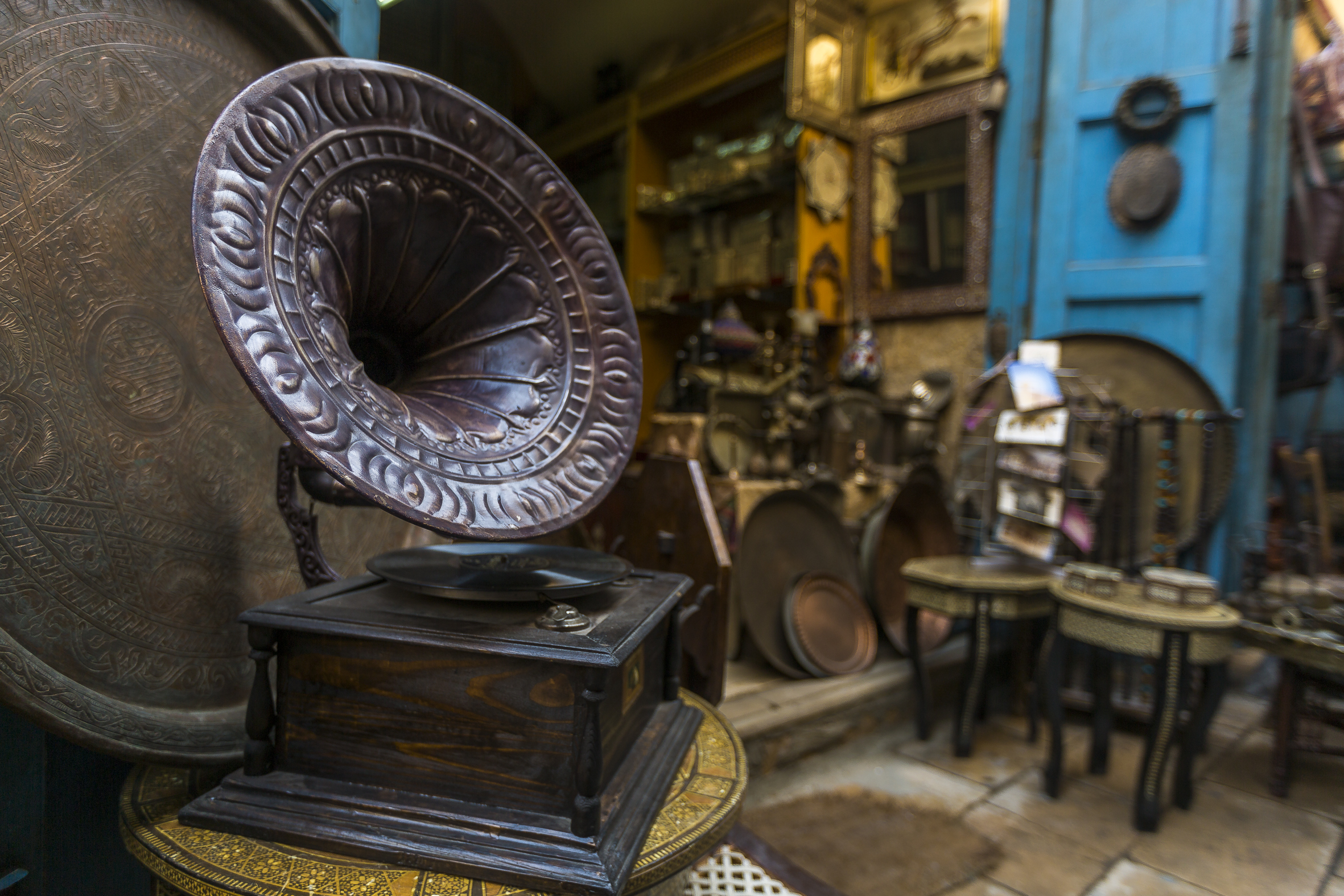
Antique shops on Al-Muizz Street

Diana Market (Imad al-Din Street, Downtown) – Held on Saturdays, featuring dozens of vendors offering handcrafted antiques and rare books.

New Boursa Street (off Qasr al-Nil Street) – Home to dozens of stores selling vintage ornaments and decor.

Al-Mu'izz Street – The oldest antiques district showcasing old radios, vintage cameras, copper engravings, and heritage artifacts.

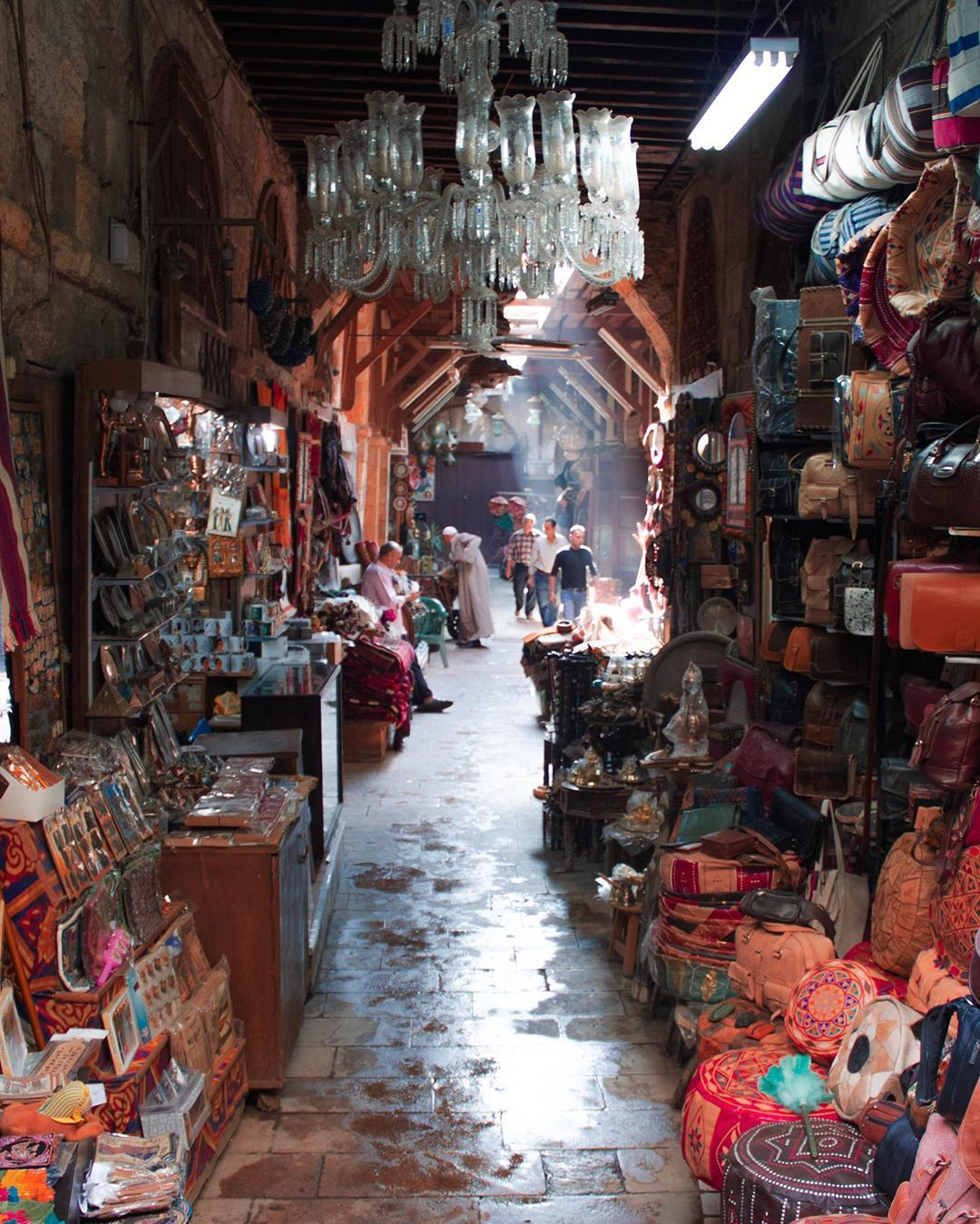
Khan el-Khalili before recent renovations

Khan el-Khalili – Hosting hundreds of tourist shops selling replica antiquities, rare artworks, and souvenirs, renowned globally among tourists.

=== Industrial and Equipment Markets ===
Imad al-Din Street, El-Gomhuria Street, and Laylat al-Qadr Square in 6 October area – dozens of shops specializing in industrial safety supplies.

Al-Ataba and El-Sebtiyya areas – Industrial machinery equipment.

Nasr City, Madinat al-Salam, Maadi, and Suez Road – Heavy machinery and equipment markets.

Amir al-Juyush Street in Al-Gamaliya and El-Tariq al-Abyad in Nahya – Hotel, restaurant, and bakery supplies.

=== Spices and Herbs Markets ===
Attarin Market in Al-Moski and Rod al-Farag – Cooking spices and medicinal herbs.

Al-Attarine Market in Al-Hussein – Featuring hundreds of major spice and herb traders, with a history in this location exceeding a thousand years.

=== Electronics and Communication Markets ===
Abdel Aziz Street in Al-Ataba – Electrical appliances and mobile phones.

Al-Bustan Mall and Al-Siraj Mall – Central markets for computers, phones, and other electronics.

=== Clothing and Textiles Markets ===
Wekalat al-Balah (Bulaq Abu al-Ela) – Wholesale clothing and imported fabrics at competitive prices.

Al-Ghouriya Market in Al-Gamaliya – Fabrics and curtains, alongside jewelry and decorative items.

=== Other Specialties ===
Auto Spare Parts – Damascus Street, Marouf Street, and Al-Tawfiqiya area – Car parts and accessories.

Agricultural Supplies and Seedlings – Ministry of Agriculture nurseries in Dokki.

Ceramics and Sanitary Ware – Al-Fagalah in Ramses and Al-Muhajirin in Ain Shams.

Fish and Vegetables – Obour Market, October Market, Saad Zaghloul Market, and Mostaqbal Masr Market.

Books and Magazines – Azbakeya Books Street above Al-Ataba Metro Station.

== Economic and Financial Importance ==
These markets represent a vital artery of Egypt's domestic trade, attracting millions of merchants and consumers daily, and they contribute significantly to the international export flow through nearby seaports such as Damietta Port, Alexandria Port, Suez Port, and Port Said Port, as well as airports like Capital International Airport and Cairo International Airport and dry ports such as 6th of October Dry Port.

== Former and historical Markets ==
Throughout history, Cairo has hosted numerous specialized markets that eventually vanished, were relocated, or were dismantled due to urban, economic, and social changes.

=== Medieval Islamic Era Markets ===
Based on the studies in "Al-Khitat" by Taqi al-Din al-Maqrizi, during the Islamic Cairo period spanning the Umayyad through the Fatimid, Ayyubid, and Mamluk eras, the city contained dozens of specialized and famous markets:

Al-Shama’in Market – Dedicated to candles, lamps, and lighting oils.

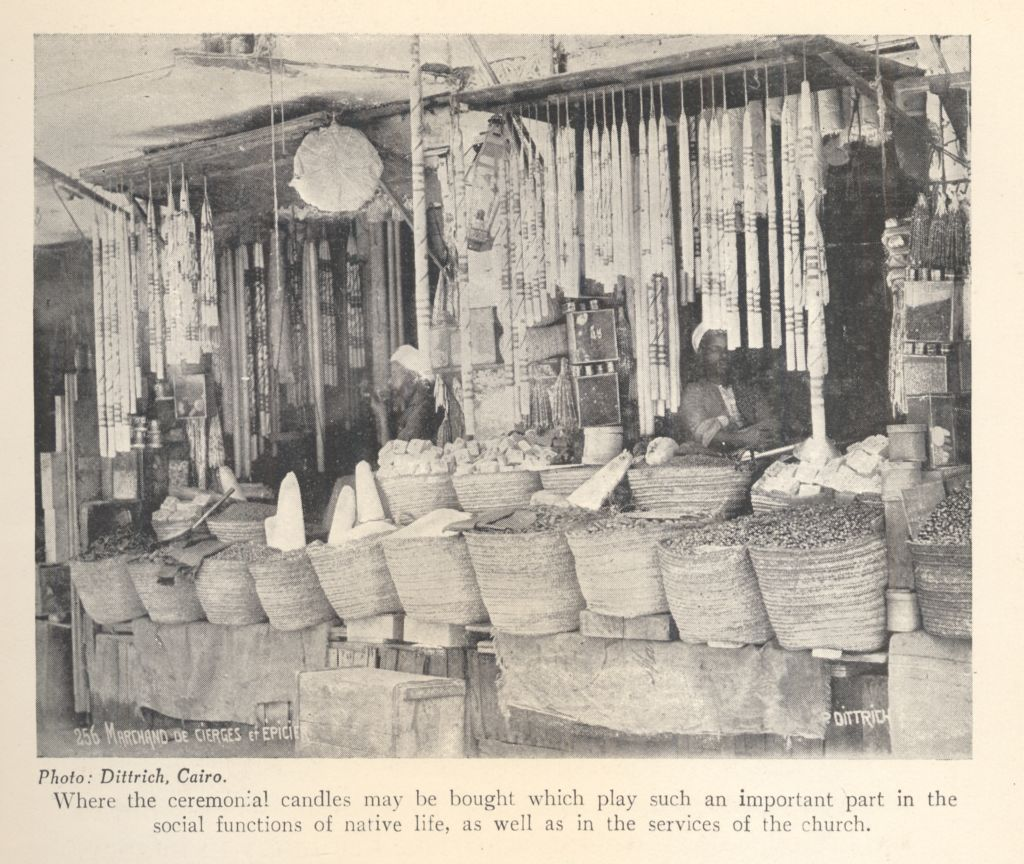
Al-Shama’in Market in 1918

Al-Nahhasin Market – Specializing in copperware trade.

Old Attarin Market – Selling spices and imported herbs before the Fatimids relocated it from Fustat to the current Al-Muizz location.

Al-Firar’in Market – Fur trading near tanneries, which existed until the Rubia Leather City project and environmental rehabilitation of the area.

Book Market – Street vendors selling books and periodicals in front of Amr ibn al-’As Mosque, then Citadel of Saladin, and later in Al-Ataba Square until 1949 when Mostafa el-Nahas designated the Azbakeya Corridor, then in 1959 under Gamal Abdel Nasser, and moved several times until settling again at Azbakeya in 1998.

Arms Market – Active during the Mamluk period, later declining by the mid-20th century.

Other markets included leather, gelatin, glue, hardware, textiles, horse gear, tents, chests, and charcoal.

=== Fatimid–Mamluk Archaeological Markets ===
Bab al-Futuh Market – Located near the Fatimid gate, hosting butchers and vegetable sellers, witnessing the reign of al-Mustansir.

Bayn al-Qasrayn Market – Stretching between Bab al-Futuh and Bab Zuweila on Al-Muizz Street, comprising around 12,000 shops before the 15th century.

=== Reasons for Market Disappearance ===
Economic and political factors: Decline of Mamluk capitals markets between 1348 and 1400 CE, with a temporary revival under sultans like Barsbay and Qaitbay.

Urban function changes: City expansions and new walls repurposed old market spaces into modern residential and commercial areas.

=== Modern Popular Markets That Closed or Relocated ===
El-Tunsi Market in El-Basatin: An informal market relocated to a formal organized market between 2017 and 2021.

Thursday Market in Matariya: Weekly activity ceased upon the establishment of the official Matariya Market.

Dair al-Nahia in Zawiya al-Hamra and Al-Mawardi in Sayeda Zeinab: Replaced by organized markets.

=== Summary of Extinct or Relocated Markets ===
Market	Era	Current Status
Al-Shama’in, Al-Nahhasin, Book Market, Al-Firar’in	Medieval (Fatimid–Mamluk)	Extinct; only archaeological remains and manuscripts remain.
Arms Market (near the Citadel)	Medieval to mid-20th century	Closed and workshops moved to industrial zones.
Bab al-Futuh, Bayn al-Qasrayn	Fatimid/Mamluk Cairo	Transformed into archaeological sites and corridors within heritage buildings.
El-Tunsi, Thursday Market (Matariya), Dair al-Nahia, Al-Mawardi, Hadayeq al-Qubba Market	Modern until 2017–2021	Activities moved to organized markets.
