= Sarah Macdonald (journalist) =

Australian writer and radio presenter (born 1966)

Sarah Macdonald (born 1966) is an Australian journalist, author and former radio presenter, and has been associated with several ABC radio programs, including Triple J, ABC Radio Sydney and Radio National. She is also known for her book Holy Cow! An Indian Adventure.

== Early life and education ==
Macdonald was born at Crown Street Women's Hospital, Sydney in 1966.

She studied psychology at university, before engaging in extensive travel.

== Career ==
After completing a cadetship at ABC NewsRadio, Macdonald worked as Triple J's political correspondent in Canberra, later hosting its morning show. She worked on television programs such as Recovery (on air 1996–2000), Race Around the World (1997–1998) and Two Shot.

In 2000, Macdonald left Triple J to live in New Delhi, India, with her husband (ABC foreign correspondent Jonathan Harley) and wrote her first book, Holy Cow! An Indian Adventure (published 2002), which proved to be a best-seller, selling 75,000 copies.

From 2005, Macdonald took over from Julie McCrossin as presenter of breakfast radio on ABC Radio Sydney, for a few months in late 2005.

She has also written for numerous publications, and created and presented the Weekend Nightlife Show.

From August 2016 to December 2018, Mcdonald co-presented a podcast, The Full Catastrophe, with author Rebecca Huntley, in which numerous people tell their own stories, including Larissa Behrendt, Frank Moorhouse, Jane Caro, and Susan Carland. She co-presented an event called "The Full Catastrophe" at the Wheeler Centre in Melbourne with Huntley in June 2018, with guests Maxine McKew, Sami Shah, Libbi Gorr, and Giselle Au-Nhien Nguyen.

As of May 2022, Macdonald was presenting Evenings on ABC Radio Sydney.

In June 2023, she appeared as herself in five episodes of the BBC One comedy Queen of Oz. Throughout the series, Macdonald is seen and heard on her radio program questioning the outrageous antics of spoiled spare to the British crown, Queen Georgiana, played by Catherine Tate.

In November 2024, it was announced that Macdonald would not be returning to ABC Radio Sydney Mornings in 2025 as ABC management did not renew her contract. On Media Watch in the week ending 30 November 2024, Paul Barry reported that the decision, made by Ben Latimer, head of audio programming, had been deplored by Ray Hadley, who called Macdonald a "quality broadcaster".

In October 2026, ABC announced that Macdonald would return to ABC Radio Sydney in 2027 as host of Afternoons.

== Personal life ==
Mcdonald is married to journalist Jonathan Harley, whom she met in the 1990s. He worked on ABC's The 7:30 Report in 2005, when she was working on breakfast radio, at which time they had two children under three years old.

== Publications ==
- Holy cow : an Indian adventure, Random House Australia, 2002, ISBN 978-1-86325-326-0
- Sarah Macdonald, ed. (2004), Come Away with MePaperback, Bantam, ISBN 978-1-86325-457-1
- Take me with you : tales of long distance love, Bantam Australia, 2005, ISBN 978-1-86325-556-1
- So ... you're having a teenager : an A-Z of adolescence from argumentative to zits, Murdoch Books, 2020, ISBN 978-1-76052-543-9 with Cathy Wilcox
