= Francis Leach =

Australian radio announcer, sports editor and journalist

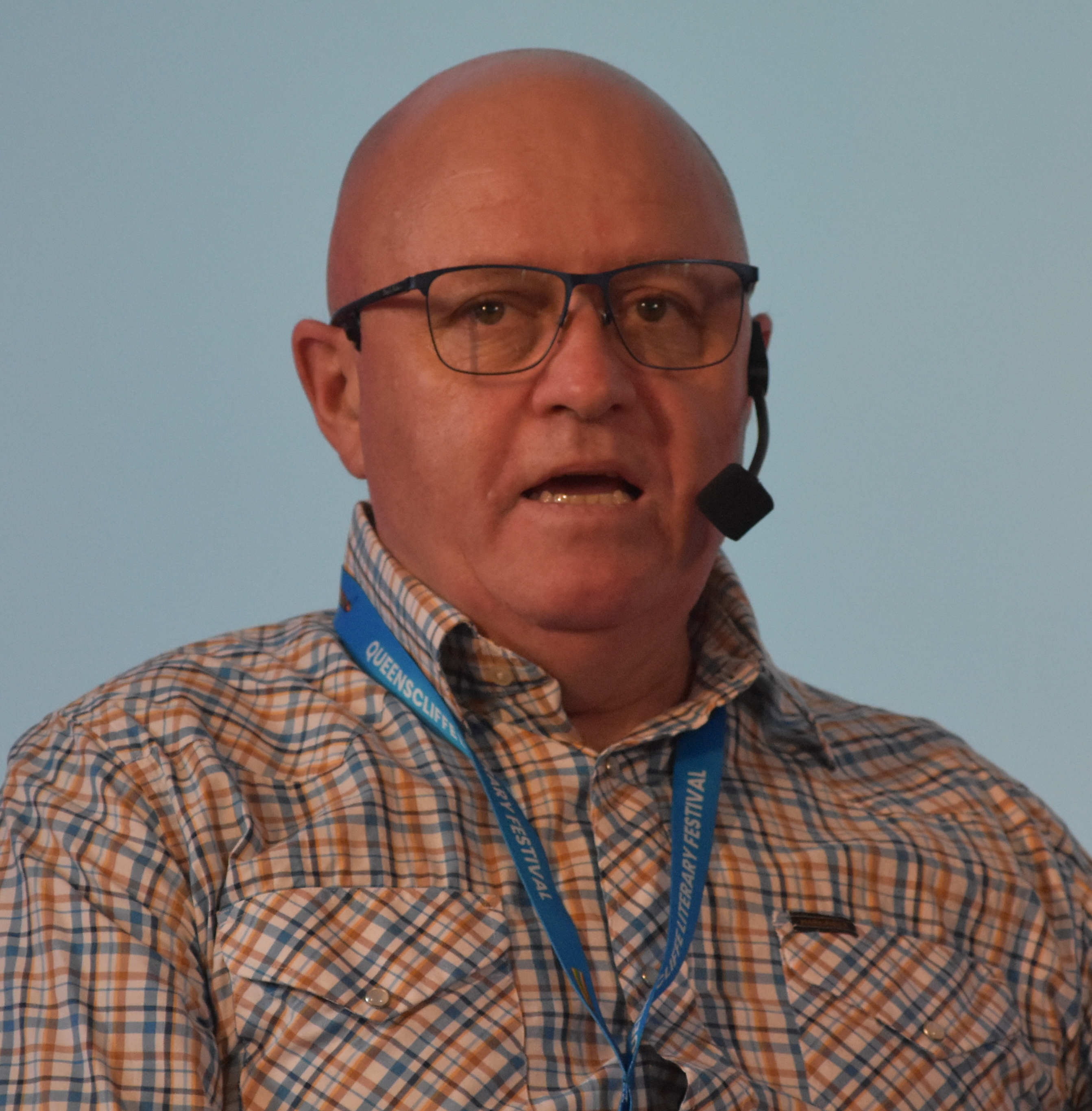
Leach in 2025 at Queenscliffe Literary Festival

Francis Leach (born 1968) is an Australian radio announcer, sports editor and journalist.

== Early life ==
Leach grew up in commission housing in the Melbourne suburb of Broadmeadows. He attended secondary school at Therry College (now part of Penola Catholic College) and St Bernard’s College.

== Career ==
Leach began his broadcasting career at Triple J in the early 1990s, hosting Three Hours of Power, the network’s weekly late‑night heavy metal program. He later moved to Creatures of the Spotlight, Triple J’s Sunday night arts show. In 2000, he transitioned to The Morning Show, Triple J’s daily three‑hour talkback and current affairs program, a role he held until 2002. During the latter part of his Triple J tenure, he also presented a Saturday morning sports program on 774 ABC Melbourne. In 2003, he hosted an arts and music program on Radio National.

In 2004, Leach joined Melbourne commercial station SEN 1116 as the afternoon presenter, before departing in June 2005 to join DMG Radio Australia’s newly launched Vega FM stations in Sydney and Melbourne. At one stage, Leach and his wife, Lynne Haultain, a presenter at 774 ABC Melbourne, hosted programs that aired in the same time slot.

Leach returned to SEN 1116 in February 2007 to co‑host the drive program The Run Home alongside former AFL footballer David Schwarz. He also led SEN’s coverage of the A League.

In 2012, Leach rejoined ABC Radio, becoming part of the ABC Radio Grandstand team and hosting a breakfast program on digital radio. He later became a regular panellist on ABC TV’s Sunday morning sports discussion program Offsiders.

In 2016, Leach reunited with Schwarz as co‑host of SEN’s Breakfast program. The following year, in 2017, he moved to host SEN’s Afternoons program.

In 2018, he was appointed sports editor at The New Daily.

In July 2026, ABC announced that Leach would replace Trevor Chappell to host Overnights on ABC Local Radio , commencing in August.

== See also ==
- Radio in Australia
