= Overnights (radio show) =

Australian radio program

- Genre: Entertainment
- Country of origin: Australia
- Language: English
- Home station: ABC Local Radio
- Announcer: Francis Leach; Ashwin Segkar
- Website: Official Overnights site
- Podcast: Overnights podcasts

Overnights is Australian overnight radio program hosted by Francis Leach and Ashwin Segkar.

Leach hosts the show from ABC Radio Melbourne from Monday to Thursday and Ashwin Segkar hosts the show from ABC Radio Brisbane from Friday to Sunday.

The program usually consists of a mix of news and current affairs, lifestyle, arts, education, music, youth and entertainment. Each night there are regular features and presenters. The listening audience is heavily featured throughout the program.

Overnights is broadcast from 2:00 am to 6:00 am (local time) on ABC Local Radio across Australia, and follows Nightlife. The program is broadcast on delay to South Australia and the Northern Territory as well as simulcast on ABC Digital Radio.

== Hosts ==
Host	Tenure
Madeleine Randall	2002–2004
Ingrid Just	2005
Helen Razer	2005
Zoe Carides	2005
Rod Quinn	2006–2025
Trevor Chappell	2000–2026
Francis Leach	2026–present

In July 2023, ABC announced that Trevor Chappell will host afternoons on ABC Radio Melbourne after 23 years at helm of Overnights. In November 2024, ABC announced that Chappell will return to host Overnights.

In March 2025, Rod Quinn announced he would be taking long service leave for the remainder of the year. He will be replaced by Michael Pavlich.

In April 2026, it was confirmed that Rod Quinn would not return to Overnights after 19 years, although he will continue working with the ABC in off‑air roles. Michael Pavlich also announced that he would be taking a period of long service leave. From 17 April, Ashwin Segkar will present the Friday to Sunday editions of Overnights.

In July 2026, ABC announced that Francis Leach will replace Chappell from August.

Previous presenters of Overnights include Madeleine Randall (2002–2004), Ingrid Just (2005), Helen Razer (2005) and Zoe Carides (2005).

Fill-in presenters include Tim Webster, Paul Verhoeven, David Prior, Lisa Hensley, Michael Pavlich, Melanie Tait and Annette Shun Wah.

== Regular contributors ==
- Erin Free (film and video reviews)
- Martin George (astronomy)
- Scott Goodings (TV reviews)
- Sabrina Hahn (gardening)
- Alisdair G. Bates (entertainment)
- Kevin Ott (entertainment)
- Gisela Kaplan (birds)
- Gordon Lynch (health and fitness)
- Janet McLeod (trivia)
- Rob Pemberton (DVD reviews)
- Chris Frame (cruising)
