= Conversations (radio program) =

Australian radio interview program

- Genre: Interview programme
- Country of origin: Australia
- Home station: Radio National; ABC Local Radio
- Hosted by: Richard Fidler and Sarah Kanowski
- Original release: 2006
- No. of episodes: 3000 approx
- Website: www.abc.net.au/radio/programs/conversations/

Conversations, formerly Conversations with Richard Fidler, is an Australian radio program broadcast on the ABC's local radio stations (except in Victoria) and Radio National every weekday. It is hosted by Richard Fidler (on Mondays, Tuesdays and Wednesdays) and Sarah Kanowski (on Thursdays and Fridays).

== History and description ==
The program has been running since 2006 on ABC Local Radio and since 2012 on Radio National, and as of 2021 is broadcast each weekday on ABC Local Radio in all Australian states except Victoria, and on ABC Radio National. It has over many years been one of the top five most downloaded podcasts in Australia, according to iTunes charts. Since 2016 it has been the Most Downloaded Australian podcast on iTunes Australia.

In 2018, the program's name changed to Conversations, and former Radio National arts journalist Sarah Kanowski joined Fidler as a regular host. The two presenters share duties, with Fidler usually presenting on Monday to Wednesday and Kanowski on Thursday and Friday.
