= Andrew Probyn =

Australian journalist

- Education: Monash University
- Occupations: Journalist and television presenter
- Years active: 1994–present
- Employer: Nine Network
- Television: Nine News
- Spouse: Felicity Hamilton

Andrew Probyn is an Australian journalist and television presenter.

He is currently the Nine Network's national affairs editor.

== Life and career ==
Probyn spent his early years in Lancashire before moving with his parents and two sisters to Sokoto in Nigeria. The family migrated to Australia in the early 1980s. Probyn attended Scotch College in Melbourne, before studying law at Monash University.

He worked at the Herald Sun for nine years before becoming state political reporter with the Australian Broadcasting Corporation in Tasmania from 2003 to 2005. He was federal political editor for The West Australian newspaper from 2005 until 2016. Probyn has twice been named Federal Parliamentary Press Gallery Journalist of the Year and was named Western Australian Journalist of the Year for 2016. He also won a Gold Quill award from the Melbourne Press Club Awards, and was a regular guest on the ABC's Insiders program. In late 2016, Probyn joined 7.30 as its political correspondent, replacing Sabra Lane. When Chris Uhlmann left the ABC, Probyn became the public broadcaster's political editor.

In early 2020, Probyn became the feature of an internet meme, initially gaining popularity from a video by comedian Brooke Taylor on social media platform TikTok, after an encounter with Prime Minister Scott Morrison at a press conference regarding the COVID-19 pandemic, where Morrison stated "Andrew, I know, but you don't run the press conference, okay?" In response to these memes, Probyn added "if something like that encourages people to at least watch press conferences where some serious stuff is being discussed, all the better."

In June 2023 Probyn was made redundant by ABC staff as part of a company-wide shift to restructure more on digital content.

In October 2023, it was announced that Probyn joined the Nine Network as a national affairs editor from November.

== Political views and complaints ==
=== Abbott–Turnbull Government ===
In 2017, Probyn described former Liberal Prime Minister Tony Abbott as "the most destructive politician of his generation" in a report for ABC News. A complaint was made to the Australian Communications and Media Authority (ACMA) and Probyn's comment was found by ACMA to be "declarative and not in keeping with the scope of the factual matters presented earlier in the report" about a speech by Abbott on climate change policy.

=== Morrison Government ===
When the Liberal Party replaced Turnbull as leader in August 2018, Probyn reported it was "vengeance pure and simple". He attributed Turnbull's loss to "a billionaires' tug of war between the nation's most powerful media moguls" (Rupert Murdoch and Kerry Stokes), telling the ABC: "Until the end, News Corp's The Australian had been unabashed in its advocacy for an end to the Turnbull prime ministership."

In the wake of a large swing against the Liberals in the subsequent Wentworth by-election, Probyn opined: "The Liberal Party and the Coalition now stand on the edge of the electoral abyss. Political gravity drags at their toes, whistling a final ruin in just over six months' time, perhaps sooner... it looks very much like a presage of a much nastier blow next year at the general election. The Prime Minister must be wondering if he's caught a hospital pass in August's madness." He praised the Liberal Party's main opponent Kerryn Phelps as "an eloquent cleanskin with a just-add-water political persona that oozes the trust and authority so lacking in the place she's poised to become tenant."

=== Justin Milne resignation ===
In 2018, the ABC board sacked the organisation's managing director, Michelle Guthrie. It was later reported that Guthrie had received a series of complaints about the ABC's political coverage from board chairman Justin Milne.

Amid government complaints about Probyn's reporting, Milne allegedly told Guthrie that keeping him as the public broadcaster's political editor was "putting the future of the ABC at risk". These claims raised questions of potential political interference by the Turnbull-appointed chairman, and Milne resigned his position, acknowledging there had been discussion of the "Probyn issue" but denying he had ever emailed Guthrie to sack journalists.

== Personal ==
Probyn is married to Felicity Hamilton. They have three children and live in Canberra.
