= Hanna Yusuf =

English television presenter

- Born: Hanna Yusuf; 1 July 1992; Merca, Somalia
- Died: September 2019 (aged 27); Paddington, London, England
- Cause of death: Suicide
- Occupations: Journalist; TV news producer
- Awards: Guardian's Scott Trust Bursary 2016/17
- Website: hannayusuf.com

Hanna Yusuf (1992–2019) was a Somali journalist who worked for BBC News as a reporter and producer.

== Early life and education ==
Hanna Yusuf was born in Somalia in 1992. She grew up in the Netherlands until age 9. Later she and her family migrated to the United Kingdom. Following her degree in French and Spanish at Queen Mary University of London, she received The Guardian's Scott Trust Bursary to complete a Master of Arts degree in newspaper journalism at City, University of London in 2017.

She spoke six languages.

== Journalism ==
She began blogging at a young age. Her first news article was published by The Independent in 2015 while she was still at university, on her experience of being suspected as a "jihadi bride" on arriving alone at Heathrow Airport.

Before joining the BBC, she regularly contributed to The Guardian, The Independent and Australian Broadcasting Corporation's Pool.

At BBC, she primarily worked for the BBC News at One programme. She investigated poor working conditions at Costa Coffee and was responsible for breaking the story about Shamima Begum’s grooming by the Islamic State.

== Activism and volunteering ==
Yusuf was a pro-hijab activist, and in 2015 appeared in a viral video made by The Guardian in which she explained her decision at the time to wear the hijab, saying, "It has nothing to do with oppression. It's a feminist statement."

She was an active volunteer at the non-profit Joseph Interfaith Foundation.

== Death ==
Yusuf died in September 2019 in Paddington, West London at the age of 27.

On 30 September 2019, her family released a statement about her death, describing her as a "vibrant professional who became a bridge between the media and the community".

An inquest in March 2020 recorded that she had taken her own life.

== Awards ==
Hanna Yusuf was posthumously nominated for Press Gazette's British Journalism Awards 2019. Special tribute was paid to her at the ceremony, where a video was played in which she had spoken of her efforts to win the trust of interviewees. The judges described her as "clearly a journalistic star in the making".
