= David Anderson (media executive) =

Australian media executive

Personal details
- Born: 1970 or 1971 (age 55–56)
- Occupation: Media executive

David Newton Anderson (born 1970 or 1971) is an Australian media executive.

== Early and personal life ==
After his parents divorced when he was two years old, he was raised by his mother while they were both living in a small unit in the Adelaide suburb of Seaton.

When his mother remarried, Anderson and his mother relocated to his stepfather's hobby farm in the Mount Lofty Ranges in February 1983 when Anderson was aged 12, just prior to the Ash Wednesday bushfires.

After his mother divorced his stepfather five years later, she and Anderson relocated from Adelaide to Melbourne so she could be closer to her sister.

In a 2018 interview, Anderson said his mother had struggled with mental illness and that his stepfather, who established a spring water business, "turned out not to be a very nice man". Despite this, Anderson has fondly recalled enjoying his teenage years on the property, where he mended fences, chopped wood, learnt how to use a chainsaw, learnt how to drive, rode PW50 motorcycles and attempted to catch snakes.

Anderson had an early ambition to become a pilot until he discovered he was colour blind. He then wanted to become a marine biologist but his asthma prevented him from scuba diving. He then had an interest in studying engineering.

Some of Anderson's early jobs included working as a kitchenhand, working in a bakery/ice cream store, and working behind a bar. He then gained employment as a cycle courier.

Anderson's mother died in 2014.

He has been married twice and has four children - a son and daughter from his first marriage, and a son and stepson with his second wife.

Anderson sometimes gets confused with other ABC employees of the same name. This includes an ABC camera operator called David Anderson and former ABC Capricornia breakfast presenter David Anderson.

== Career with the ABC ==
=== Early career ===
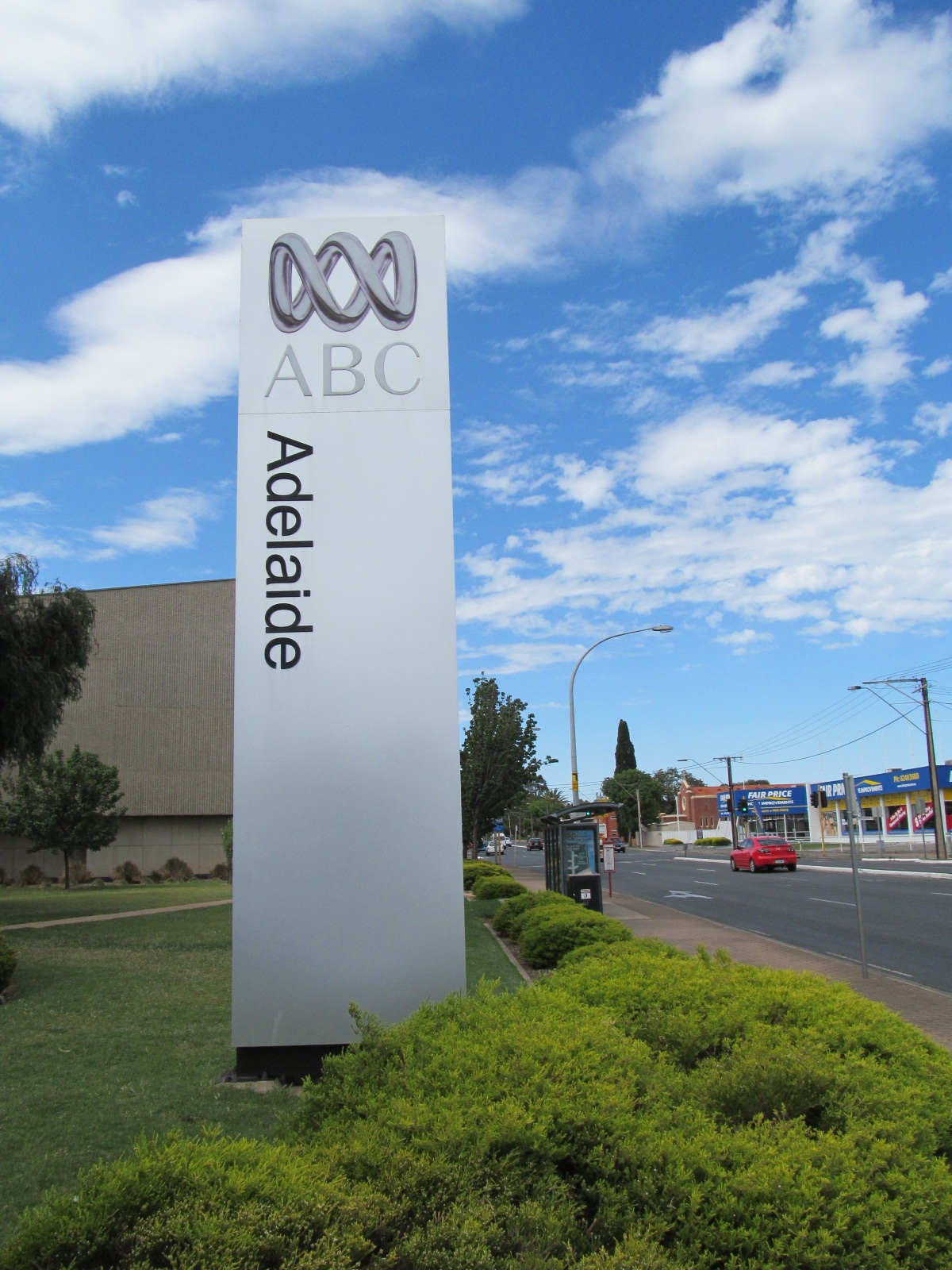
Anderson began his career at the ABC in Adelaide

Anderson first joined the Australian Broadcasting Corporation in Adelaide in 1989, after he was involved in an accident in the Adelaide city centre. While working as a courier, riding a bicycle to deliver letters and parcels, he collided with a bus. Immediately after the collision, another courier allegedly stole documents from Anderson which were destined for KPMG.

Following the incident, a friend encouraged Anderson to find a safer job and told him her father was a floor manager at the ABC in Adelaide who could arrange employment for Anderson at the organisation.

Anderson subsequently commenced working as a utility attendant at the ABC a week after his accident. Initially his duties included changing dirty tea towels for clean ones in all the kitchenettes located throughout the multi-storey building.

From there, Anderson began to rise through the ranks at the ABC doing various jobs including sorting the mail and working on the switchboard where he fielded complaints and general enquiries from listeners and viewers.

=== Later career ===
Anderson later moved into television production at the ABC in Melbourne where after initially worked as a staging assistant for the ABC's Melbourne Symphony Orchestra, he later became a manager in the television department. He later become the head of production in 2011.

When Mark Scott became managing director in 2006, Anderson was promoted to chief finance person in the television department.

Scott then appointed Anderson to his senior executive team where he worked in various roles.

These included director of corporate strategy and planning, director of digital network and director of television, a role in which Anderson is credited with helping commission successful ABC Television programs Utopia, Employable Me, Bluey, Mystery Road.

His role as director of television later expanded to director of entertainment and specialist in February 2018 to include responsibilities association with the ABC's radio networks.

In March 2018, Anderson personally telephoned a political candidate running for an Australian Senate seat in Victoria in the 2019 Australian federal election after comedian Greg Larsen called him a cunt on the ABC program Tonightly with Tom Ballard. Despite Anderson's apology, the Australian Communications and Media Authority cleared the ABC of any wrongdoing in August 2018 as they considered the word had been used for comedic reasons rather than a genuine personal attack. A week after the ACMA verdict, the ABC announced that Tonightly would be axed due to low ratings. Anderson later told a Senate Estimates committee that it was his decision to axe Tonightly due to the production costs involved.

=== Managing director ===
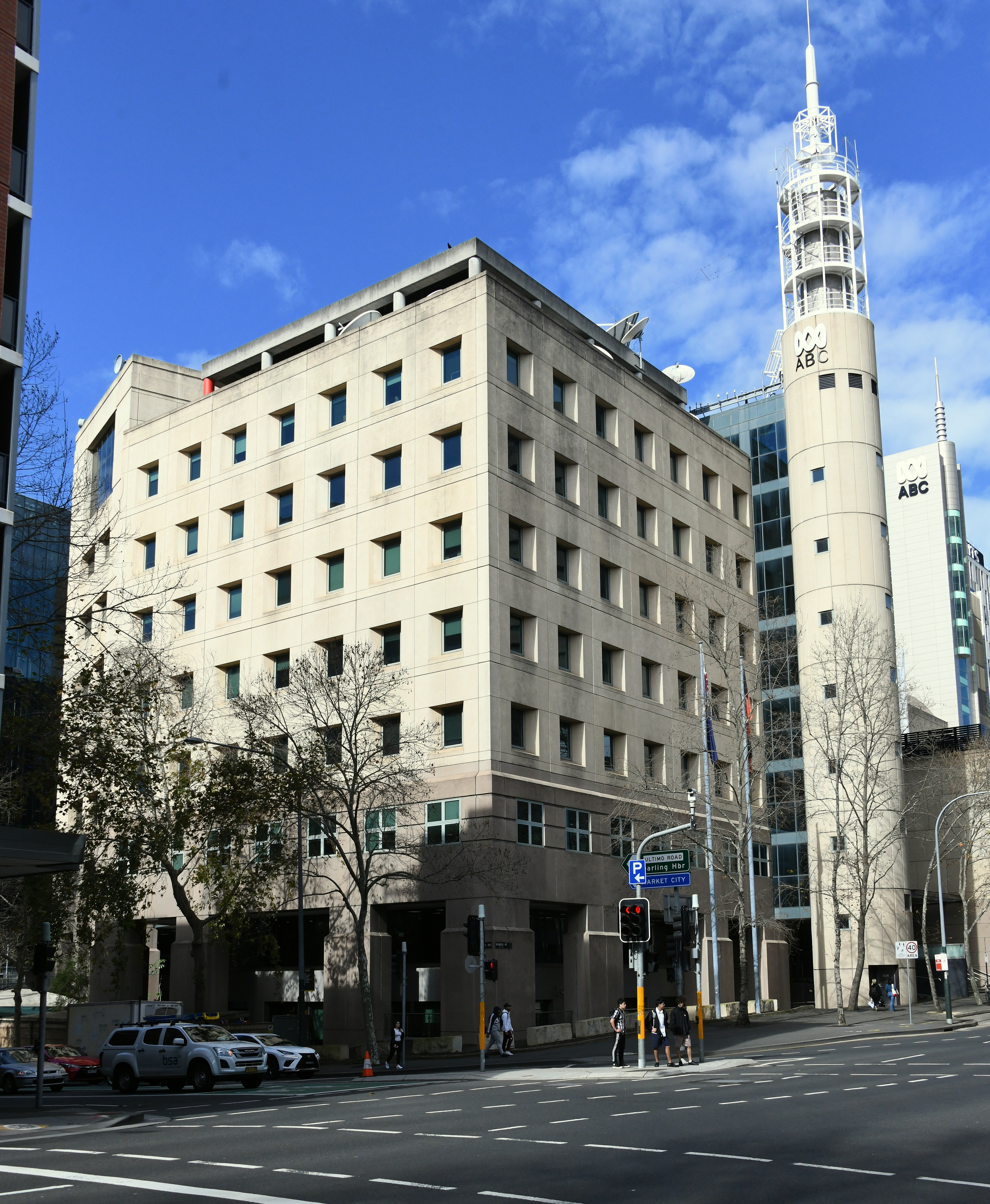
The ABC's headquarters in Sydney

With the pending sacking of managing director Michelle Guthrie in 2018, ABC chairman Justin Milne appointed Anderson to the position of acting managing director. Milne then resigned after Guthrie accused him of sacking journalists the Federal Government didn't like. Milne was replaced by media veteran Ita Buttrose in February 2019, who in turn appointed Anderson to the position of managing director in May 2019 after the ABC Board unanimously agreed to the appointment.

According to Buttrose, Anderson's knowledge of the ABC was "unsurpassed" and that he had a "deep understanding" of audience needs. Anderson is known for shying away from attention and for his aversion to public speaking. Anderson admitted that Buttrose has helped him by giving him advice about how to conduct public speaking engagements.

As managing director, Anderson earns more than $1 million each year. However, he took a 5% salary cut for six months in 2020 during the COVID-19 pandemic.

He publicly supported ABC journalists Dan Oakes and Sam Clark when their 2017 coverage of the alleged unlawful killings of unarmed men and children in Afghanistan by Australian soldiers prompted a raid on the ABC's Sydney offices by the Australian Federal Police in June 2019. Anderson and fellow media executives Hugh Marks and Michael Miller subsequently appeared as part of a panel at the National Press Club in 2019, to show a united front over concerns about the potential impact police raids had on press freedom in Australia.

In October 2019, Anderson admitted that he understood why viewers found an episode of Q+A "confronting" or "offensive" and confirmed the ABC would investigate whether the program met the organisation's editorial standards. The organisation resolved 235 complaints which were lodged with the ABC regarding the Q+A episode which was hosted by Fran Kelly and broadcast on 4 November 2019 as part of The Wheeler Centre's feminist ideas festival Broadside. Viewers took issue with the failure to have radical views challenged, the lack of balance on the panel, a panelist appearing to encourage violence and the excessive usage of coarse language by panelists. ABC management removed the episode from ABC iview and cancelled it from scheduled repeat broadcasts on ABC Television, which ABC Audience & Consumer Affairs found to be sufficient action to resolve the complaints.

While he is not a journalist himself, Anderson holds the title of the ABC's editor-in-chief and will occasionally request to view a story before it is broadcast. In June 2021, he delayed the airing of a Four Corners story by Louise Milligan which explored an alleged link between QAnon and Australian prime minister Scott Morrison. Anderson said he had "concerns" and advised that there were elements of Milligan's story that needed to be "strengthened" before it could air. The story was broadcast a week later.

While acting managing director in 2018, Anderson relinquished his title as editor-in-chief during a Four Corners investigation into the events surrounding the changes in ABC management.

Anderson delivered the National Press Club address on 8 July 2020. During his address Anderson said the ABC aimed to be more culturally diverse in its staff and programming while also advocating for the introduction of law reforms to protect journalists and whistleblowers from prosecution if they are acting in the public interest, following the 2019 police raid on the ABC.

In 2020, Anderson was leading the ABC when the organisation had to make major changes to the way it operated due to the COVID-19 pandemic. That same year, Anderson oversaw major changes at the ABC due to budget restrictions which resulted in 250 jobs being cut from the organisation, the axing of the 15-minute 7:45am ABC News bulletins on ABC Local Radio and a reduction in Australian Story and Foreign Correspondent episodes.

Under Anderson's leadership, there has been an increase in the representation of women on the ABC. Anderson said the ABC had "a special obligation to lead the way on gender equality in the Australian media". In March 2021, ABC News achieved an equal representation of male and female interviewees and commentators for the first time since joining the BBC's 50:50 project.

In 2021, Anderson oversaw a commercial deal between the ABC and Google and Facebook which enabled the ABC to further invest in regional areas of Australia and allowed them to open new bureaus in regional towns such as Charleville, Queensland which Anderson officially opened in March 2022. Another notable deal which was reached under Anderson's leadership was the 12-month partnership between the ABC and First Nations Media Australia which aimed to increase the representation of Indigenous Australians in the Australian media.

Another change Anderson flagged early in his tenure as managing director was the introduction of personalised ABC iview accounts, which required viewers to register their personal details which would enable them to sign-in to the platform. This was despite some concerns being raised by privacy experts about how a viewer's personal information would be used by the ABC.

One ongoing issue Anderson has struggled with is the issue of appropriate use of social media by ABC employees. Following controversial tweets by Laura Tingle, Louise Milligan, Alan Kohler and Julia Zemiro, Anderson revealed in 2022 there had been four instances where employees had been disciplined after their conduct breached the corporation's social media policy. Anderson sent an email to staff in 2021 reminding them of their obligations while using social media. However, in April 2022, the ABC was investigating social media activity by Weekend Breakfast presenter Fauziah Ibrahim.

As managing director, Anderson has also had to address two high-profile defamation cases which were separately brought against the ABC by politicians Christian Porter and Andrew Laming.

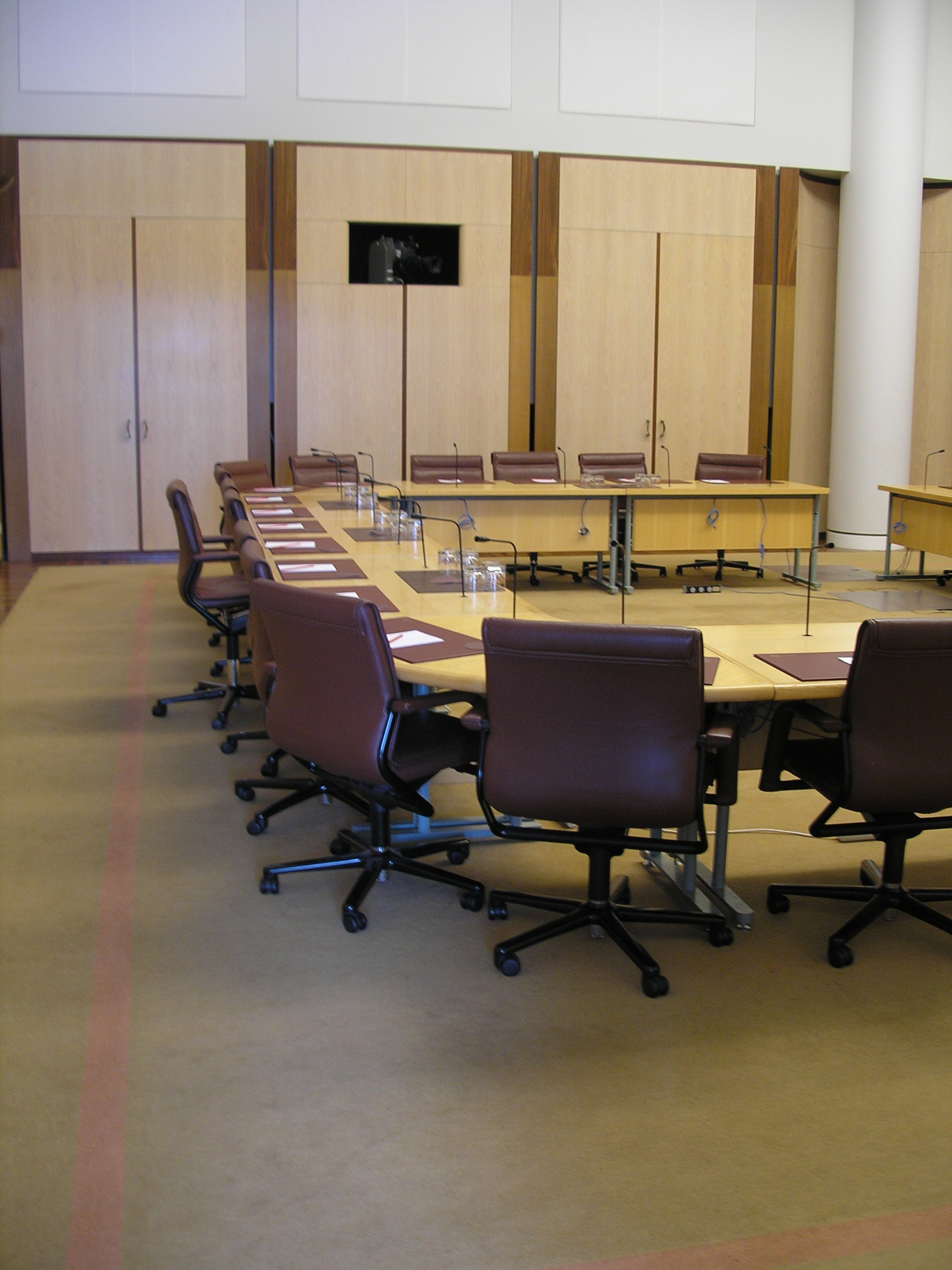
The Australian Senate Committee room at Parliament House in Canberra where Anderson attends Senate Estimates hearings

In February 2022, Anderson released a book called Now More Than Ever: Australia's ABC, which was published by Monash University Publishing.

In May 2022, Anderson was named CEO of the Year at the annual Australian LGBTIQ inclusion awards in Sydney. In 2019, Anderson had been one of 60 ABC employees to ride on the first float the organisation had ever entered in the Sydney Gay and Lesbian Mardi Gras parade.

After the ABC received criticism to axe 58 jobs in the archives and libraries department in June 2022, Anderson defended the decision by saying the modernisation of the library would be "a positive for journalists".

In late 2022, Anderson announced there would be a further restructure at the ABC in 2023. Regional ABC teams are expected to be integrated into the national news and investigations division. Additionally, Anderson said a chief content officer will be appointed to the organisation to oversee the commissioning of local programs.

As managing director, Anderson regularly attends Senate Estimates hearings at Parliament House in Canberra where he is questioned over the various operations of the ABC.

Unlike previous managing directors of the ABC, Anderson has not been provided with a chauffeured government vehicle and in 2021 was using his own 14-year-old Toyota Yaris to drive himself to the ABC's Sydney headquarters and to Canberra for Senate Estimates hearings.

In October 2022, Anderson was listed at No. 17 on Mediaweek's "Power 100" list of influential Australian media identities.

In January 2024, Media, Entertainment & Arts Alliance members from the ABC voted in favour of a no confidence motion against Anderson after reported alleged interference from pro-Israel lobbyists. It was alleged was that Anderson was cowardly and illegally involved in the dismissal of Antoinette Lattouf in December 2023, after she posted material to social media about the Israel-Gaza war.

In August 2024, Anderson announced his intention to resign as ABC Managing Director. In December 2024, it was announced that former CEO of Nine Entertainment, Hugh Marks, will take up the role of managing director in March 2025.

== Other roles ==
From December 2012 to June 2018, Anderson was a non-executive director of Screenrights, and from April 2017 to June 2020, he was a non-executive director of Freeview Australia.

Anderson is a member of the Champions of Change Coalition 2016 National Group.
