= Alan Ramsey =

Australian journalist (1938–2020)

- Born: Alan Graham Ramsey; 3 January 1938; Hornsby, New South Wales, Australia
- Died: 24 November 2020 (aged 82); New South Wales, Australia
- Occupations: Columnist; Speechwriter
- Spouse(s): Jeanette (divorced); Laura Tingle (m. 1995; div. 2017)
- Writing career
- Years active: 1953–2011

Alan Graham Ramsey (3 January 1938 – 24 November 2020) was an Australian journalist and columnist for The Sydney Morning Herald from 1986 to 2008. In a career spanning 56 years, he worked for The Daily Telegraph, The Australian, The Sydney Morning Herald, and the Australian Associated Press; covering the Vietnam War, Australian politics, and writing columns and opinion pieces. He was inducted into the Australian Media Hall of Fame in 2017.

== Early life ==
Ramsey was born in Hornsby, New South Wales, on 3 January 1938 to Thelma Ruth Simmonds and Eric Ramsey. His father worked assorted jobs including a factory job and a few sales jobs. He was the eldest of five siblings. His mother took him and his siblings to live at Chittaway Point, New South Wales, when his father was enlisted in the war.

He completed his Intermediate Certificate studies from Gosford High School before joining The Daily Telegraph.

== Career ==
Ramsey started his career in journalism in 1953 as a copy boy and later as a cadet journalist working for Frank Packer, who then owned the Sydney Daily Telegraph. Ramsay gained experience working for small newspapers in Mount Isa and Darwin, before joining Australian Associated Press (AAP). He was a correspondent for AAP in Port Moresby and London, before being appointed in 1965 as a correspondent to travel with the first contingent of Australian combat troops to Vietnam. After returning to Australia, he was appointed to cover federal politics in Canberra for The Australian, in February 1966.

During a parliamentary debate in 1971, Ramsey shouted "You liar!" from the press gallery of the House of Representatives, directed at then Prime Minister John Gorton. Ramsey said he felt compelled to speak out because Gorton's speech contradicted "one particular crucial part" of what Gorton had said in his office in an interview. Hansard reported Ramsay's clearly audible interjection, which was a breach of parliamentary rules. Realising his error, Ramsey quickly apologised both to the House and the Prime Minister. Gorton accepted the apology, while inviting the Labor Party Opposition to withdraw its motion that Ramsey be immediately arrested by the serjeant-at-arms of the House. Ramsey later recalled that House speaker William Aston had helped him draft the apology.

Ramsey wrote for a number of other publications before becoming a speech-writer and press secretary for Australian Labor Party opposition leader Bill Hayden from 1978 until 1983. He took over the weekend national politics column for The Sydney Morning Herald from Peter Bowers and wrote the column from 1987 until his retirement in December 2008. He retired as the oldest longest serving Australian political reporter covering Federal politics. In his 2009 book A Matter of Opinion, he published a selection of more than a decade of opinion pieces for The Herald. He was a member of the board of the Whitlam Institute, but resigned, along with another director, subsequent to the forced resignation of founding director Peter Botsman in November 2002, after Botsman had been targeted by fellow director Mark Latham, following a falling out between the two.

Writing about Ramsey in The Sydney Morning Herald, columnist Damien Murphy notes that his columns brought in a mix of "insights, anger, venom, sentimentality, and grace." He goes on to say that, through his columns, Ramsey was a "chronicler of Australia's march from Menzies to modernity."

He was inducted into the Australian Media Hall of Fame in 2017.

== Personal life ==
Ramsey was married twice: first to Jeanette Murphy and then to journalist Laura Tingle. Ramsey and Tingle divorced in 2017. He had three children from his first marriage and a daughter from his second marriage.

He died on 24 November 2020, aged 82, after suffering from dementia and having spent the last months of his life in a nursing home on the south coast of New South Wales.

== Books ==
- Ramsey, Alan (2011). The Way They Were: The View from the Hill of the 25 Years That Remade Australia. University of New South Wales Press. ISBN 978-1-74223-271-3.
- Ramsey, Alan (2009). A Matter of Opinion. Allen & Unwin. ISBN 978-1-74176-905-0.
