= Antoinette Lattouf =

Australian-Lebanese journalist (born 1983)

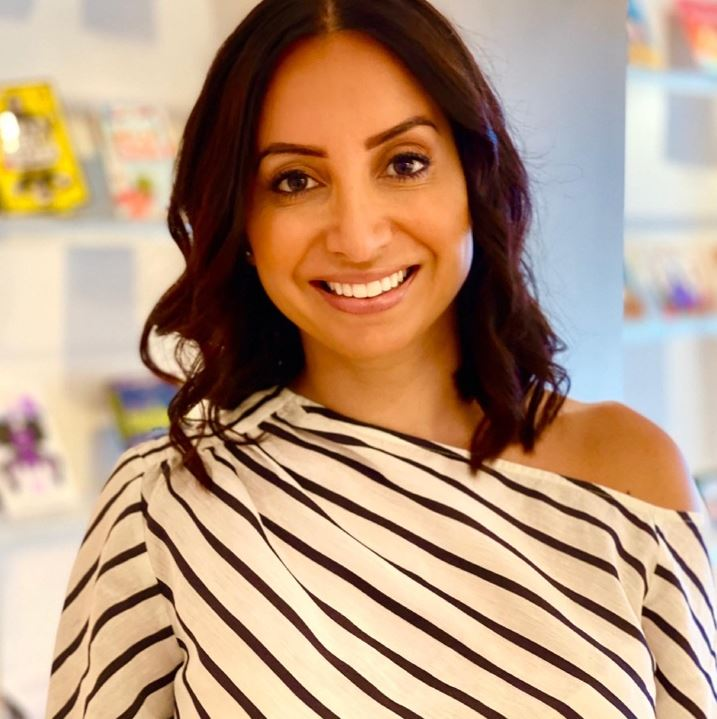
- Born: Antoinette Lattouf; 1983 or 1984 (age 41–42); Auburn, New South Wales, Sydney, Australia
- Occupations: Journalist; author; columnist; presenter; host; diversity advocate
- Website: antoinettelattouf.com

Antoinette Lattouf (Arabic: أنطوانيت لطوف; born 1983) is an Australian journalist, host, author, and diversity advocate, who has worked at Network Ten, Australian Broadcasting Corporation (ABC), SBS, Southern Cross Austereo, Triple J, and as a social commentator for various online and broadcast publications. She is also known for her work as a columnist for The Sydney Morning Herald. She was the subject of a high-profile unlawful termination case against the ABC in 2023–2025 with the Federal Court of Australia finding in her favour in June 2025.

== Early life and education ==
Lattouf's parents came to Australia as refugees from Lebanon in the 1970s. She was born in 1983 or 1984 in Auburn, New South Wales, Sydney, Australia.

Lattouf studied Communications (Social Inquiry) at the University of Technology, Sydney.

== Career ==
Lattouf has worked at Network Ten, ABC, SBS, Southern Cross Austereo, Triple J, and as a social commentator for various online and broadcast publications. She is also known for her work as a columnist for The Sydney Morning Herald.

In 2020, Lattouf spoke out about bullying and racism she experienced while working at SBS at the start of her career.

From early 2022, and as of February 2024, Lattouf has been a permanent co-host of the daily LiSTNR podcast The Briefing.

=== ABC dismissal ===
In December 2023, Lattouf began presenting ABC Radio Sydney's Mornings program for one week as a fill-in host for Sarah Macdonald. Subsequently, she posted on social media a Human Rights Watch (HRW) report alleging that Israel was using starvation as a weapon of war during the Gaza war. A coordinated campaign by a pro-Israel lobbying group called "Lawyers for Israel", senior members of the Executive Council of Australian Jewry, and another group called "J.E.W.I.S.H creatives and academics" pressured ABC management, including ABC chair Ita Buttrose, to sack Lattouf, with one member smearing her Jewish lawyer, Josh Bornstein, as a "Traiter!" [sic].

Leaked messages from a Lawyers for Israel WhatsApp group chat revealed the group's co-ordinator, who is a Sydney lawyer, suggested targeting Federal Communications Minister Michelle Rowland, despite no actionable offence against the ABC. In the group chat, the group's co-ordinator also stressed the importance of organising complaints from people who were lawyers, so that the ABC would "feel there is an actual legal threat".

The ABC dismissed Lattouf on 20 December 2023, citing her social media post referencing the HRW report as the reason. The ABC had itself covered the release of the same HRW report. Al Jazeera noted that Lattouf was among a growing number of journalists worldwide dismissed for expressing views supporting Palestine or calling for an end to Israel's bombardment of Gaza. Lattouf responded to her dismissal by stating she believed it was unlawful and not a victory for journalism or critical, fair thinking. Lattouf's dismissal led ABC members of the Media, Entertainment and Arts Alliance (MEAA) to pass a vote of no-confidence in ABC's managing director, David Anderson, on 22 January. The MEAA motion criticised ABC leadership for failing to protect the broadcaster's independence and staff when attacked.

Lattouf lodged an unlawful termination claim with the Fair Work Commission (FWC), asserting that her dismissal was due to expressing a political opinion and that her race was a contributing factor. Conciliation efforts at the FWC failed. In its submission to the FWC on 15 January, the ABC stated that Lattouf was warned about posting controversial topics prior to her dismissal and argued that she could not make an unlawful termination application as she was not technically dismissed. The case was featured on the ABC's Media Watch program on 5 February 2024. Host Paul Barry criticised the ABC's actions as indicative of weakness and incompetence for not properly handling the situation and not supporting Lattouf for her remaining two shifts. Lattouf requested the FWC to release emails related to her dismissal, including those specifically sent by Sydney barrister Robert Goot, which had been mentioned in the leaked WhatsApp messages. The FWC refused her request on 16 February. On 3 June 2024, the FWC found that Lattouf was dismissed by the ABC, issuing the certificate required for Lattouf to file her unlawful termination case in the Federal Court.

== Federal Court Proceedings (Lattouf v ABC) ==
Lattouf filed an unlawful termination claim in the Federal Court of Australia, contending that her dismissal was both procedurally unfair and politically motivated, with her political views and racial background playing a role in the decision.

During the proceedings, key ABC executives—including managing director David Anderson and chief content officer Chris Oliver-Taylor—testified about the internal decision‐making process that led to Lattouf’s removal. Evidence presented in court included internal emails and text messages; one such email from former ABC chair Ita Buttrose reportedly stated that the broadcaster “owed her nothing” in light of numerous complaints received from a pro‑Israel lobbying group. The ABC defended its actions by asserting that Lattouf breached its social media guidelines by reposting a Human Rights Watch report on alleged starvation as a tool of war in Gaza, a charge Lattouf disputes on the grounds that her post relayed information from a reputable source.

The case has generated significant public and internal debate regarding the ABC’s disciplinary practices. Critics have argued that the broadcaster applied inconsistent standards, noting that other presenters—such as Laura Tingle and Paul Barry—were not subjected to similar sanctions for expressing personal views. Lattouf’s legal team stated that her removal was not solely due to a breach of social media policy but also reflected underlying biases. In her testimony, Lattouf described the severe personal impact of her dismissal, including increased anxiety, depression, and a reliance on alcohol and sleeping aids; her psychiatrist’s evidence corroborated these claims.

Subsequent cross‐examinations highlighted contrasts in the treatment of ABC presenters. While Lattouf was removed for her controversial social media posts, other high‐profile journalists were allowed to express personal opinions without facing similar repercussions. During his testimony, managing director David Anderson acknowledged that systemic issues, including racism in Australia, exist; however, he said that the ABC’s disciplinary measures were based on breaches of editorial standards rather than discriminatory practices.

Observers suggested that the outcome of Lattouf v ABC could have broad implications for employment practices and the enforcement of editorial policies at public broadcasters.

On 25 June 2025, the Federal Court handed down its verdict. The court found that the ABC had contravened section 772(1) of the Fair Work Act by dismissing Lattouf "for reasons including that she held a political opinion opposing the Israeli military campaign in Gaza". The court ordered the ABC to pay A$70,000 of damages to her. The court also found that the ABC management had been thrown into a "state of panic" by "an orchestrated campaign by pro-Israel lobbyists to have Ms Lattouf taken off air", and so had decided to "appease the pro-Israel lobbyists who would inevitably escalate their complaints about the ABC employing a presenter they perceived to have antisemitic and anti-Israel opinions in such a public position". The court found there was no evidence that Lattouf's dismissal was related to her ethnicity or national origin. The court also issued a 10-year order suppressing the identities of nine members of the Lawyers for Israel group who had complained about Lattouf to the ABC.

== Other activities ==
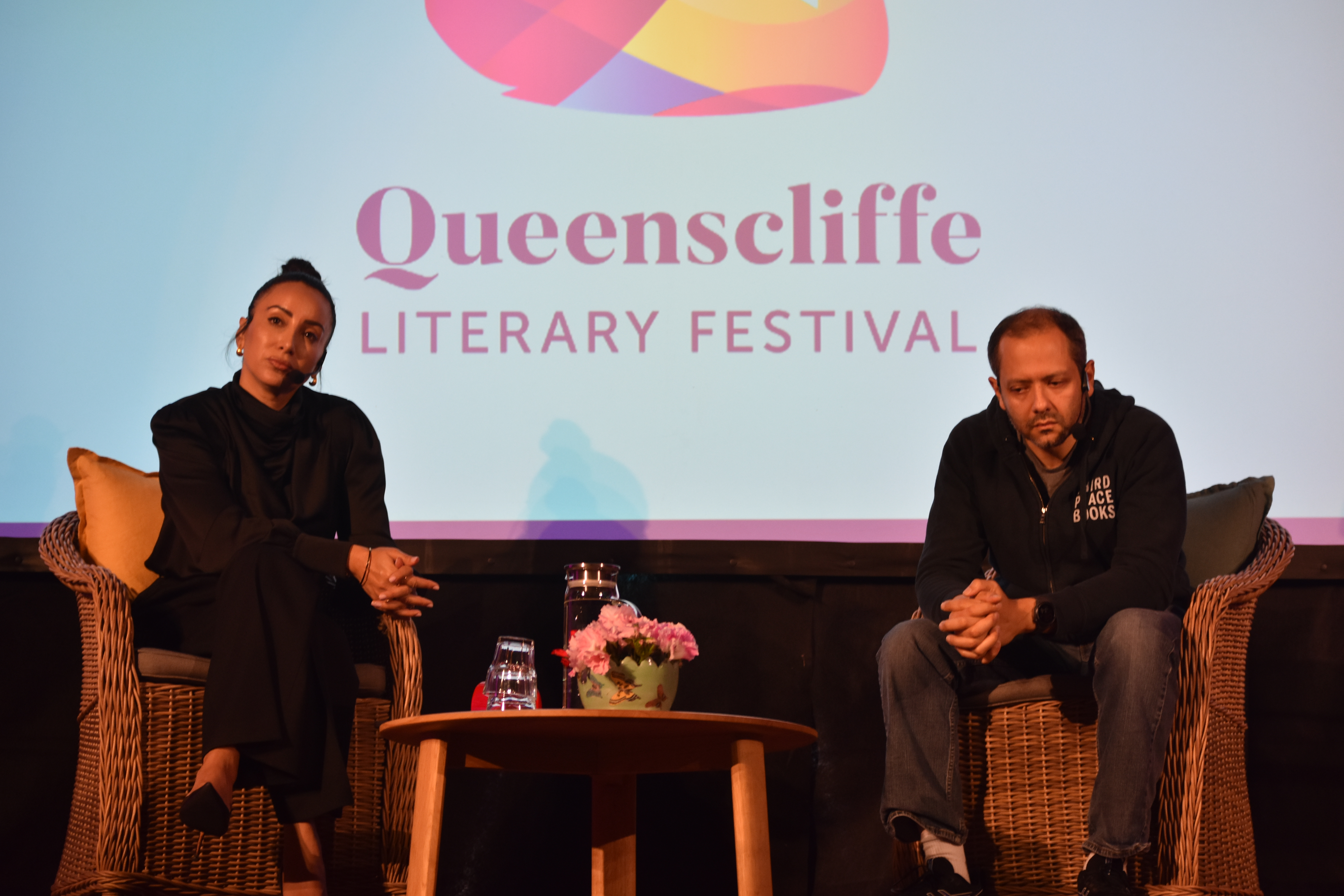
Lattouf and Omar El Akkad at the Queenscliffe Literary Festival in 2025

Lattouf co-founded Media Diversity Australia (MDA) in 2017, a not-for-profit organisation which seeks to increase cultural and linguistic diversity in Australia's news media. The MDA's advisory board members include Stan Grant, Waleed Aly, Hugh Riminton, Monica Attard, Talal Yassine and Tim Soutphommasane. In 2020, MDA released their report in regard to the lack of diversity in Australian television news and current affairs. Lattouf was a co-author of Who Gets To Tell Australian Stories, Australian-first research led by MDA and conducted by Macquarie University, University of Sydney, Deakin University and Western Sydney University with partners Google and the Media Entertainment and Arts Alliance.

Her first book How to Lose Friends and Influence White People was published by the Penguin Random House in 2022. That same year, Lattouf delivered her first TEDx Sydney talk.

In 2024 she starred in the ABC TV series House of Gods, in which she acted as a radio presenter called Leila who unearths something damning on air.

Following her victory in court against the ABC and its chair Kim Williams, Lattouf launched a podcast, 'We Used to be Journos', with journalist Jan Fran. The podcast covers topics like the systematic institutional bias in media organisations like the ABC against human rights.

== Ette Media ==
After the court case concluded, Lattouf and Jan Fran started an independent media outlet named "Ette Media". The name is derived from the end of the first names "Antoinette" and "Jeannette". They explained on their podcast that the French-derived name ending is common in Lebanon due to Lebanon's French colonial history.

== Recognition and awards ==
- 2019: Listed in the Australian Financial Review's 100 Women of Influence
- 2021: Women's Agenda Leadership Award
- 2021: B&T Women in Media Champion of Change

== Personal life ==
Lattouf is married and has two daughters. She is an ambassador for the Australian Thyroid Foundation after a Studio 10 viewer noticed a lump on her neck and contacted Network 10; as a result, Lattouf had surgery to remove the lump and was diagnosed with Hashimoto's thyroiditis.
