= Jan Fran =

Australian journalist and presenter

- Born: Jeannette Francis; 1985 (age 40–41); Lebanon
- Education: Mount Saint Joseph, Milperra, University of Technology Sydney
- Known for: The Feed
- Spouse: Al Morrow (m. 2015)
- Website: janfran.net

Jeanette Francis (Arabic: جانيت فرانسيس), better known as Jan Fran, is a Lebanese-Australian journalist and presenter. She has worked with the Special Broadcasting Service (SBS), and served as co-host of current affairs and satire TV program The Feed and the podcast The Few Who Do alongside Marc Fennell.

== Early life ==
Fran was born in Lebanon to a Maronite Christian family. In 1989, she moved to Australia, where she grew up in Bankstown in Sydney, New South Wales. Fran studied journalism and international studies at the University of Technology Sydney.

== Career ==
Fran began her career as a foreign correspondent with SBS, working on Insight and Dateline. For her series on women in post-war Uganda, she was nominated for a Young Walkley Award in 2012. She was a presenter on The Feed from the program’s launch in 2013 until July 2019. She has collaborated in various ways with co-presenter Marc Fennell.

As a presenter, Fran has hosted TV coverage of Tropfest, and has been a guest presenter on Network Ten’s The Project. In 2017, she was made an Australia Day Ambassador. Fran also hosted the series Medicine or Myth? on SBS in 2019.

Fran is an ambassador for Plan International Australia and has hosted a series of podcasts called Sexism and the City which Plan commissioned. She has also challenged the different ways in which the perpetrators of the Christchurch mosque shootings and the Orlando nightclub shooting were described and presented by the media.

In 2019 Fran won a Walkley Award for three episodes of her online video series, The Frant in the category of "All Media: Commentary, Analysis, Opinion, and Critique." Her works examined the gender pay gap, the merit myth, and biased media reporting after the mass-shooting in Christchurch.

As of November 2019, she is writing a memoir, Of Middle Eastern Appearance, to be published by Hachette Australia.

In 2021, Fran began hosting Question Everything with Wil Anderson on ABC.

=== Ette Media ===
In 2025, Fran started a company with Antoinette Lattouf "Ette Media". The pair launched a podcast "We used to be Journos".

== Personal life ==
In 2015, Fran married Al Morrow, an advertising director.
