= Laura Tingle =

Australian journalist and author (born 1961)

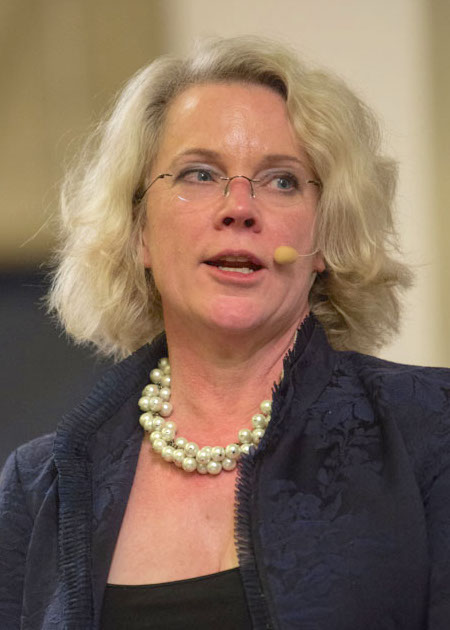
- Tingle in 2016
- Born: 14 February 1961 (age 65); Sydney, New South Wales, Australia
- Occupation: Journalist
- Years active: 1981–present
- Organization(s): Fairfax Media; Australian Broadcasting Corporation
- Spouse: Alan Ramsey (m. 1995; div. 2017)
- Children: 1
- Father: John Tingle

Laura Margaret Tingle (born 14 February 1961) is an Australian journalist and author. She is the ABC's global affairs editor and was formerly the chief political correspondent of the Australian Broadcasting Corporation's 7.30 current affairs television program and previously the political editor of the Australian Financial Review.

== Career ==
Tingle began her career in Sydney as a cadet journalist with Fairfax Media's Australian Financial Review and Business Review Weekly in 1981, reporting on financial deregulation and the floating of the dollar. In 1987, she moved to News Limited's The Australian newspaper as an economics correspondent. She was appointed chief political correspondent in 1992 and national affairs correspondent from 1994. In 1996, she returned to Fairfax as a political correspondent for The Age and The Sydney Morning Herald. In 1998, she resigned as Canberra bureau chief for The Age. In 2002, she resigned from the Sydney Morning Herald, returning to the Australian Financial Review as political correspondent. She was subsequently appointed chief political correspondent and Canberra bureau chief from 2003, then political editor in 2008.

Tingle's book, Chasing the Future: Recession, Recovery and the New Politics in Australia—documenting the recession of the early 1990s—was published in 1994. She has written four issues of Quarterly Essay: "Great Expectations – government, entitlement and an angry nation" in June 2012, "Political Amnesia – how we forgot to govern" in November 2015, "Follow the Leader: Democracy and the Rise of the Strongman" in September 2018 and "The High Road: What Australia Can Learn From New Zealand" in November 2020. Her book In Search of Good Government, combining "Great Expectations" and "Political Amnesia", was published by Black Inc. in 2017.

Tingle won Walkley Awards in 2005 and 2011 and was highly commended in the 1992 Walkley Awards for her investigative journalism. She also won the Paul Lyneham Award for Press Gallery Journalism in 2004 and was shortlisted for the John Button Prize for political writing in 2010. In 2017 she won the Qantas-European Union journalism prize.

In May 2018, Tingle left the Australian Financial Review and joined the Australian Broadcasting Corporation (ABC) as chief political correspondent of current affairs television program, 7.30. She also regularly fills in for Sarah Ferguson on the program. Tingle makes regular appearances on ABC Radio National's Late Night Live and Insiders on ABC TV.

Since December 2020, she has been the president of the National Press Club. Tingle took over from ABC journalist, Sabra Lane. On 1 May 2023, Tingle was appointed staff-elected director at the ABC, winning by 30 preferential votes from 2073 ballots over business journalist Daniel Ziffer.

== Political analysis and commentary ==
Tingle is a regular political commentator on the ABC's 7.30 and Insiders television programs and is also a newspaper columnist.

As the political editor for the Australian Financial Review (AFR) from 2008 to 2018, Tingle has published numerous analyses of Australian politics and prime ministerial leadership in Australia.

When Tony Abbott became Leader of the Opposition in 2009, Tingle wrote for the AFR on 1 December that "the election of Tony Abbott is a disaster of epic proportions for a party that was already up against it in the race to remain competitive at the next election. They have now taken a major step to the Right, towards their base, and away from mainstream voters." The Liberal/National Coalition lost the 2010 Australian federal election to the Australian Labor Party.

On the day of the 24 June 2010 leadership spill in the Australian Labor Party, Tingle wrote in the AFR that the upheaval was "the ultimate flexing of union and factional power to unseat a prime minister, a move so brazen that it left the cabinet, and the caucus, in the dark." Tingle reflected on the 2010 Gillard coup against Prime Minister Kevin Rudd in the 2015 Quarterly Essay, 'Political Amnesia', where she wrote "here was a coup that was ill-conceived, ill-constructed and catastrophic, one that showed us how such manoeuvring could have a material impact on the rest of us. For normal government didn't resume the next day."

In the aftermath of the 2010 Australian federal election when the incumbent Gillard government and Abbott-led Opposition were negotiating with the House of Representatives crossbench about who would form government, Tingle responded to a Treasury report that there was an $11 billion hole in the opposition's election costings with an article for the AFR in which she wrote that the Opposition was "not fit to govern" and were either "liars", "clunkheads" or both. Tingle received a Walkley Award for this article in 2011, in recognition of her "independent mind taking an impartial approach to an often confusing political landscape."

During the first year of Prime Minister Gillard's leadership, Tingle wrote in the AFR on 5 December 2011 following the annual Australian Labor Party Conference, "if Tony Abbott is the hollow man, Prime Minister Julia Gillard has emerged from the weekend's ALP national conference as the shallow woman." In a political analysis of Gillard's first cabinet reshuffle on 13 December 2011, Tingle regarded that "it fails both the self-interest and national interest test."

Responding to the Australian Labor Party's Mid-Year Economic and Fiscal Outlook report under Prime Minister Gillard in 2012, Tingle wrote in the AFR on 26 October 2012 that "the government, Tony Abbott observed yesterday, has a political strategy but no economic plan. A lot of Labor's senior ministers would violently disagree with him but not for the obvious reason. The government, they would say, has an economic plan but is not so sure about the political strategy."

In the 2015 Quarterly Essay, "Political Amnesia", Tingle wrote that "Tony Abbott won office in 2013 on a platform of undoing things: reversing specific measures like the 'carbon tax', but also removing the sense of chaos which voters felt surrounded the Gillard government."

In the AFR on 17 September 2015, Tingle described the leadership coup against Prime Minister Tony Abbott as "the end of a particularly poisonous period in Australian politics" in which "Australia has been pushed sharply to the right, pushed far enough that it even created cracks within the Coalition." Two years later, Tingle described Abbott as an "utter destructive force, an utter waste of space this man has been on the Australian political landscape", questioning his contribution to Australia's "polity that has not involved tearing something down."

When Abbott's successor Malcolm Turnbull resigned as Liberal prime minister ahead of an internal party leadership spill in 2018, Tingle described the coup on the ABC as a "pointless political assassination: an ideological war but a campaign redolent with spite and personal ambition." On the day he resigned, Turnbull chose Tingle as the first of a small number of reporters permitted to question him at his final press conference.

Since her resignation from the Australian Financial Review in May 2018 to join the Australian Broadcasting Corporation, Tingle has been the chief political correspondent of 7.30 and makes regular appearances on ABC Radio National's Late Night Live and Insiders on ABC TV. She left 7.30 in May 2025 to become the ABC's global affairs editor.

On an ABC News Daily episode on 7 October 2022, commemorating the 10th anniversary of Gillard's misogyny speech, Tingle described Gillard as "one of the last great Parliamentarians and she made her name as a parliamentarian by some absolutely crushing speeches on the run."

In December 2025, Tingle faced criticism from comments made on the ABC's Politics Now podcast concerning the 2025 Bondi Beach shooting after "and that the "[perpetrators'] actions are not based on their religion". The remarks attracted criticism for appearing to downplay the role of Islamist extremism in the attack. An ABC spokeswoman later clarified that Tingle's comments were "about separating religion from radicalisation."

== Publicity in the Australian media ==
While working for the Australian Financial Review in 2018, Tingle accepted a role as host of the Association of South East Asian Nations business summit in Sydney from 17–18 March 2018 at the invitation of the Department of Prime Minister And Cabinet. The Australian newspaper subsequently reported that she had signed a $15,000 contract for the two days hosting work with the Department. Tingle told the newspaper: "I see absolutely no conflict."

In June 2018, Communications Minister Mitch Fifield wrote to ABC director Michelle Guthrie to make a formal complaint about panellists on the Insiders program, one of whom was Tingle, making a "false claim" in the reporting of the setting of the date for by-elections. On 26 June 2018, the ABC issued an apology for its news coverage of the date set for Super Saturday By-elections, which was broadcast on the 7pm news bulletin by Andrew Probyn on 25 May 2018.

In a separate analysis piece written by Tingle, that appeared in both the AFR and on the ABC website on 26 May 2018, Tingle questioned "was it a bit of political bastardry by the Government to nominate a date which just happened to coincide with the ALP's national conference? Of course it was. Is it a decision which has unfortunately tarnished the Australian Electoral Commission and the well-regarded Speaker of the House of Representatives, Tony Smith? Yes. But politics is politics. And sorry, but if you think Labor would not indulge in such acts if it suited their purpose, you would be a little naive."

In 2020, Tingle commented on the departure of ABC journalist Philippa McDonald from the ABC as "ideological bastardry" on the part of the Morrison government in a tweet which concluded "hope you are feeling smug @ScottMorrisonMP". ABC managing director David Anderson called the tweet, which Tingle had deleted, a "mistake" during a subsequent Senate Estimates hearing.

During an editorial for the 7.30 program on 3 March 2021, Tingle spoke on the removal of the Morrison government's Attorney General Christian Porter after he denied an allegation raised by the ABC that he had assaulted a woman when he was a teenager. New South Wales police pronounced the matter closed on the basis of "insufficient admissible evidence to proceed". Tingle stated on the program that "the public are entitled to expect the highest standards of probity from the Attorney General the bar is not whether they have been found guilty of a crime beyond reasonable doubt, or even whether they have been charged with one, and also that in public office, the perception of integrity is important, not just the fact of it. This is now the issue the prime minister, who is standing by his attorney general, has to consider."

On the eve of the referendum vote for the Albanese Government's proposal for an Aboriginal and Torres Strait Islander Voice to Parliament, Tingle wrote on the ABC that "a No vote — and how we got to one — will change the way we see ourselves, and send the most unloving of messages to Indigenous Australians". In the aftermath of the defeat of the referendum for the Voice, Tingle reiterated that the "campaign and its aftermath have confirmed we are in new political territory where there seems to be little restraint, or even regard for the truth."

In a response to an audience question at a book launch for journalist David Marr's book Killing for Country, Tingle referred the internal ABC Voice Tracker as an inadequate measure of balanced reporting, commenting that "this is nuts... completely sick... In the interests of trying to be balanced ... we've ended up not doing a good job of covering the referendum debate."

In a statement issued on 14 October 2023, Tingle clarified her remarks from the book launch, stating "this is an issue that I think is an exceptionally difficult one for the media generally, not just the ABC, and not just in terms of this campaign, at a time when political messaging is splintering into social media messaging, and the old rules of political campaigning are changing ... The ABC has provided unprecedented levels of coverage from around the country of the referendum campaign, particularly from Indigenous voices, and I'm very proud of the work my colleagues have done in often very stressful circumstances."

Throughout May 2024, Tingle argued on a number of platforms that Peter Dutton was weaponizing migrants for political reasons. In a post-budget column for the AFR on 17 May 2024, subsequently published to the ABC on 18 May 2024, Tingle wrote that "the significance of a major political leader [Dutton] playing so divisive a card on our community is a step that shouldn't go unnoticed ... It is deadly simple, but very dangerous, politics." She concluded that "a hugely complex issue has been reduced to a populist and misleading piece of political mischief."

At the Sydney Writers Festival on 26 May 2024, Tingle expanded on her written statements, stating that on the evening of Dutton's address in reply to the budget, "I had this sudden flash of people turning up to try to rent a property or at an auction, and they look a bit different – whatever you define different as – and he has given a licence for them to be abused where people feel they are missing out. We're a racist country, let's face it. We always have been and it's very depressing and a terrible prospect for the next election."

On 26 May 2024, ABC news director, Justin Stevens published a statement to the ABC that "the ABC and its employees have unique obligations in the Australian media. Laura has been reminded of their application at external events as well as in her work and I have counselled her over the remarks." In her personal statement that same day, Tingle clarified that the comment was "in the context of a discussion about the political prospects ahead. I wasn't saying every Australian is a racist. But we clearly have an issue with racism." Responding to the controversy on 2GB Radio, Peter Dutton said Tingle had "outed herself now as somebody who is a partisan, she's a Greens/Labor supporter. I mean, she's just now completely destroyed her credibility." Tingle received a mixed reaction for her statements

== Personal life ==
Tingle was born in Sydney, the youngest daughter of Pam Chivers and journalist John Tingle who, after a long career in journalism with the ABC and commercial radio, founded the Shooters Party in 1992 and was elected to the New South Wales Legislative Council in 1995.

Tingle was educated at Turramurra High School and the Australian International Independent School.

She married fellow journalist Alan Ramsey in 1995. They separated in 2012 and divorced in 2017. Tingle has one daughter. Tingle was in a relationship with actor Sir Sam Neill for three years from 2018 to 2021.

A portrait of Tingle by James Powditch titled Laura Tingle – the fourth estate was a finalist for the 2022 Archibald Prize. The portrait's composition and Tingle's image were inspired by the monochrome profile image of Marlene Dietrich in the publicity posters and images for the movie Judgment at Nuremberg, and Tingle's image incorporated a collage of texts related to her and chosen by both her and the artist. The portrait was subsequently purchased by Tingle's mother.
