= Briony Scott =

Australian educator and columnist (born 1963)

- Born: Briony Edmonds; 28 September 1963 (age 62); Birmingham, England, United Kingdom
- Education: University of Sydney
- Occupations: Teacher; educator; columnist
- Predecessor: Dr Elizabeth Guy and Ms Julie Wiseman
- Successor: Ms Linda Douglas
- Spouse: Mark Scott (m. 1986)

Briony Scott is an Australian educator and columnist, who was the principal of Wenona School (2011-2024), an independent school for girls that is located in the lower north shore of Sydney, New South Wales, Australia.

== Early life and education ==
Scott is the daughter of Dr Carl Edmonds OAM and his wife Cindy (Cynthia). She was born in the United Kingdom when Dr Edmonds was working there. Dr Edmonds was the Officer in Charge, Royal Australian Navy School of Underwater Medicine and is considered to be one of the world's leading diving medical experts.

Scott attended the University of Sydney, and holds Bachelor of Science in agriculture, Master of Education and Doctor of Education degrees, with research focusing on girls' education, the utilization of educational technology, and non-government school funding policy.

== Career ==
She is well known for her fortnightly column in the North Shore Times entitled "Ask the Teacher" where she looks at issues regarding parenting and education.

Prior to commencing at Wenona, Scott was the Principal of Roseville College from 2006, and commenced in the role of Principal of Wenona College in July 2011. She previously worked as Head of Senior School and Director of Studies at Oxford Falls Grammar School and as a systems analyst for Olivetti.

Scott is an advocate for single sex education. In 2021, Scott's views on sexual consent education in schools received widespread publicity.

== Personal life ==
She is married to Mark Scott, former Secretary of the New South Wales Department of Education and 27th Vice-Chancellor of the University of Sydney.

In 2015, she was diagnosed with lung cancer.
