= Mount Saint Joseph, Milperra =

Location
- Milperra, south-western Sydney, New South Wales; Australia; 33°56′30″S 150°59′36″E

Information
- Type: Systemic comprehensive single-sex secondary day school
- Motto: Latin: Induimini Arma Lucis (Put on the Armour of Light)
- Denomination: Roman Catholic
- Established: 1960; 66 years ago
- Founders: Sisters of St Joseph
- Oversight: Catholic Education Office, Archdiocese of Sydney
- Principal: Elizabeth Clark
- Staff: ~100
- Years: 7–12
- Gender: Girls
- Enrolment: c. 912
- Colours: Blue and white
- Website: msj.syd.catholic.edu.au

Mount Saint Joseph, Milperra (commonly known as MSJ) is a Systemic Roman Catholic comprehensive single-sex secondary day school for girls, located in Milperra, a south-western suburb of Sydney, New South Wales, Australia. Founded in 1960, the school is based on the values and spirit of Mary MacKillop. It was established under the auspices of the Sisters of St Joseph. The current principal is Elizabeth Clark and the assistant principal being Clair-Maree Simpson. Mount Saint Joseph's brother school is De La Salle Revesby Heights.

== History ==
In 1959, Father Landers (Panania) and Father Carr (Revesby) accompanied Mother Leone Ryan, the Superior of the Sisters of St Joseph, in search of a suitable site for a new girls’ high school in western Sydney. At this time the population of the area was increasing rapidly and the parishes were unable to meet the costs of building such a school. The search ended with the purchase of the land on which the school now stands. The land was classified as Green Belt, so permission had to be sought and duly granted from the councils concerned. A school was built and in 1960, girls from the surrounding parish schools began their secondary education at Milperra. After that, the Congregation of the Sisters of St Joseph provided the necessary support for the ongoing development of the school.

On 20 April 1989, the Mount St Joseph School Board was instituted following the incorporation of the school as Mount Saint Joseph Milperra Ltd.

In 2013, the congregation handed over administration of the school to Sydney Catholic Schools. Mount St Joseph retains its links to the Josephite community through annual feast days and celebrations, connections to other Josephite schools in Warmun (Western Australia) and Tarma (Peru), and participation in social justice and leadership initiatives alongside the Sisters of St Joseph.

== Academics ==
MSJ offers a range of curriculum choices ranging from ATAR level HSC courses, through to VET courses supported by the National Training Framework. The students perform well in the HSC, especially when compared with students in the region and across the state. In 2016, the school was ranked 126th in the state in the Sydney Morning Herald's HSC Rankings.

== Notable alumni ==
- Margaret Beazley AC, KC – the 39th Governor of New South Wales, judge, and former President of the New South Wales Court of Appeal
- Chloe Esposito – gold medalist in the modern pentathlon at the 2016 Summer Olympics
- Jan Fran - journalist and presenter

== See also ==
- List of Catholic schools in New South Wales
- Catholic education in Australia
