= ABC Pool =

- Website type: Participatory media
- Owner: Australian Broadcasting Corporation
- Creator: ABC
- Website: http://pool.abc.net.au/
- Commercial: No
- Launched: 2008
- Current status: Closed

ABC Pool was a website housed within the Australian Broadcasting Corporation (ABC) as part of ABC Radio National's Multi-platform and Content Development department. The site was launched as a public beta in August 2008 and is a space where people can upload, share, collaborate and communicate with other members of the 'Pool' community. Some of the best work on the site has resulted in on-air outcomes through programs on ABC Radio National and ABC Open network. ABC Pool was a project that explores the space between broadcast and participatory media.

The site made use of Creative Commons licences, both releasing limited ABC archival material as CC and allowing users to license their work as CC.Pool has been one of the ABC's first websites to take advantage of Creative Commons Licensing, enabling Pool's online community to share content within a safe legal framework, allowing for pastiche and adaptation.

The Pool website went offline in June 2013.

== Activities ==
Visitors, Members and Community Editors were able to use ABC Pool in different ways, with varying degrees of involvement.

Visitors to Pool

- Browse, comment and download contributions
- View comments on works and number of times the work has been recommended
- Use the search function to find remixable media (search: category, media, people and projects)

Members of Pool

- Start project and initiate collaborations
- Upload and share works using Pool and control the conditions of their re-use using Creative Commons Licensing
- Set up a personal gallery by choosing favourite works
- Follow people by accessing a feed of their latest work
- Receive email notification when people re-use, recommend or comment on their work
- View auto-suggestions displaying works and members that share similar interests
- Works contributed to ABC Call-outs have the potential of being broadcast on the ABC

Members who are Community Editors

- Recommend contributions to be featured on the front page of Pool

=== MyBurb ===
MyBurb was an augmented reality project set around the suburb of Redfern which ABC Pool developed during 2011.

== Awards ==
- 2008 ABC Digital Media Awards - Best Blue Sky Project
- 2009 Government 2.0 Award - Task Force Innovators
- 2009 Hosted the first releases of open licensed ABC Archive material to the public for creative use
