= Intermediate Certificate (Australia) =

School qualification in Australia

The Intermediate Certificate was a certificate awarded in Australia for the successful completion of three years of high school. (in the state of Victoria it was 4 years) This was at around age 14–15, in what was then called Third Form and is called Year 9 today. From 1943 until 2009, students in New South Wales were able to leave school at 15. A student who wanted to enter university needed a Leaving Certificate, for the completion of another two years. Both were based on external examinations. The Intermediate Certificate was abolished in 1965, being replaced by the Fourth Form (now Year 10) School Certificate.

== See also ==
- Education in Australia
