= Justin Milne =

Australian business executive

Justin Milne FAICD
- Born: Justin Trevor Milne; 19 November 1952 (age 73); Adelaide, South Australia
- Education: St Peter's College, Adelaide
- Alma mater: Flinders University
- Occupations: Business executive Non executive Director
- Known for: Chairman of the Australian Broadcasting Corporation (2017–18)

Justin Trevor Milne (born 19 November 1952) is an Australian business executive and company director known for his roles as Chairman of the Australian Broadcasting Corporation, chief of broadband services at Telstra, and CEO at OzEmail, as well as serving on the boards of Tabcorp, the National Basketball League, NetComm Wireless, ME Bank and MYOB Group. and NBN Co

Milne was born in Adelaide, South Australia and was educated at St Peter's College before gaining a Bachelor of Arts from Flinders University. After university, he worked in the film industry, joining the South Australian Film Corporation where he produced several short documentary films and worked as an assistant editor on films including Peter Weir's The Last Wave. In the 1980s, Milne bought a film company in Sydney and moved there, where he became involved in the technology sector, and co-founding a car sales listing platform, Globe Media. He then moved on as a director at MSN, then later OzEmail, and then to Telstra. Milne was appointed as Chairman of the ABC in 2017.

After the sacking of ABC Managing Director Michelle Guthrie on 24 September 2018, it was alleged that Milne then asked for journalist Emma Alberici to also be sacked, leading to protests from ABC staff and calls for an inquiry. Further allegations have surfaced about Milne asking for Andrew Probyn's sacking in relation to Probyn's reporting of the Super Saturday by-elections. Milne himself resigned on 28 September, and denied sending emails regarding either Alberici or Probyn.

Milne simultaneously held positions with ABC, NBN Co and NetComm Wireless (a supplier to NBN Co) leading to comments regarding his having conflicts of interest, and his workload.

Media offices
Preceded by James Spigelman	Chair of the Australian Broadcasting Corporation; 2017–2018	Succeeded by Ita Buttrose
