= Mark Scott (businessman) =

Australian businessman

Mark Scott AO
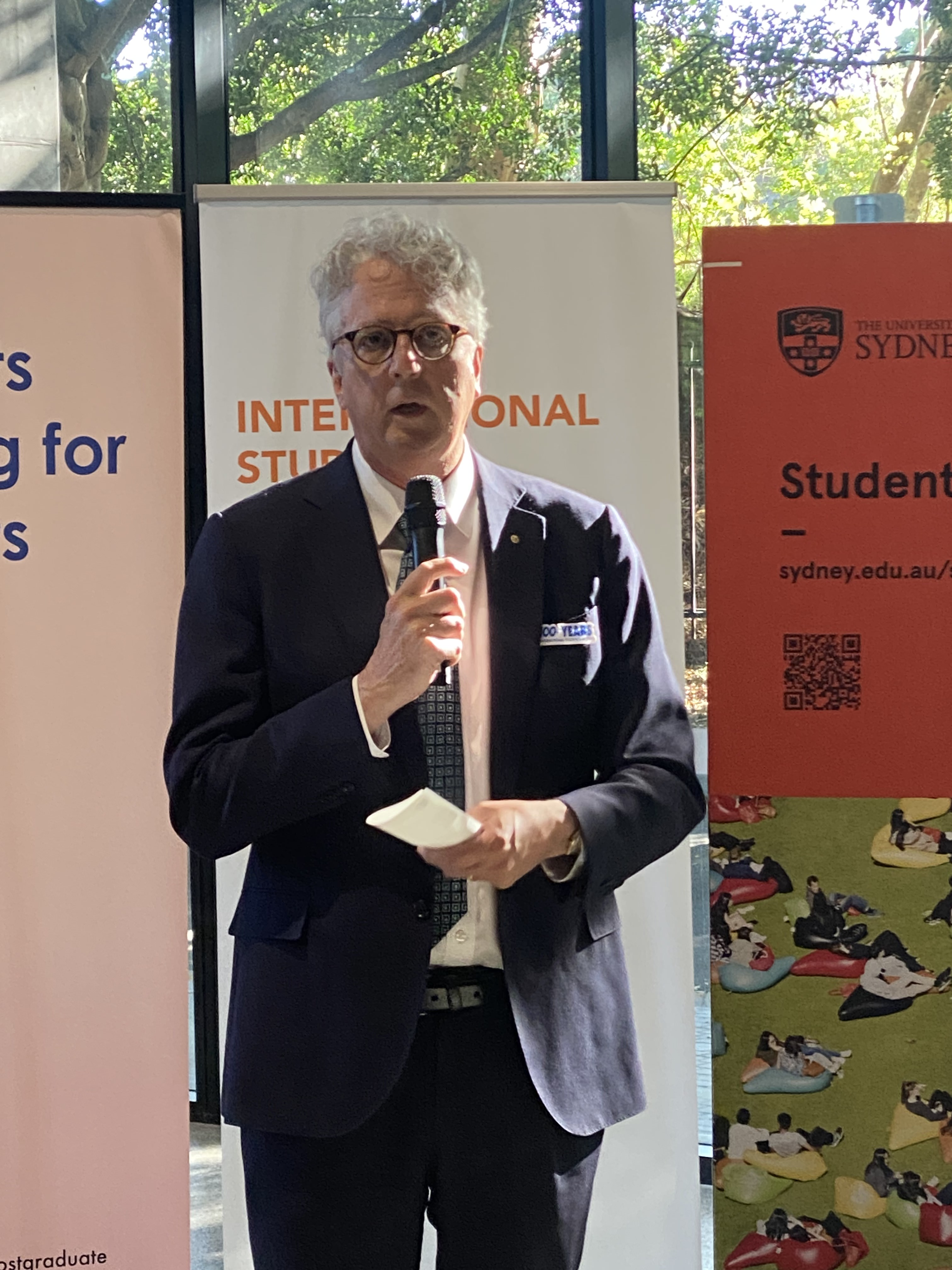
- Scott in 2023

27th Vice Chancellor of the University of Sydney
- Incumbent
- Assumed office 19 July 2021
- Chancellor: David Thodey
- Preceded by: Stephen Garton

New South Wales Secretary of the Department of Education
- In office 1 September 2016 – 23 April 2021
- Preceded by: Michele Bruniges
- Succeeded by: Georgina Harrisson

Personal details
- Born: Mark Walter Scott; 9 October 1962 (age 64) Los Angeles, California, U.S.
- Spouse: Briony Scott
- Education: University of Sydney (BA, MA); Harvard University (MPA)

Mark Walter Scott AO (born 9 October 1962) is an Australian and American public servant and academic administrator who serves as the Vice-Chancellor and President of the University of Sydney.

Scott had previously held a senior role at Fairfax Media, responsible for the editorial content of the group's major newspapers, including The Sydney Morning Herald, The Age, The Sun-Herald and The Sunday Age. He was the managing director of the Australian Broadcasting Corporation from 2006 to 2016. From 2016 to 2021, Scott served as Secretary of the New South Wales Department of Education.

== Personal life ==
Scott was born on 9 October 1962 in Los Angeles. He holds dual Australian and United States citizenship. He is a grandson of Sir Walter Scott AC, who was responsible for the introduction of decimal currency in Australia. His father Brian reviewed the NSW Department of Education in the 1980s.

He attended Knox Grammar School in Wahroonga, New South Wales. Scott holds a Bachelor of Arts, a Diploma of Education and a Master of Arts from the University of Sydney, and a Master of Public Administration from Harvard University.

Scott is married to Briony Scott, Royal Far West CEO, a specialist child development service providing vital support to children in rural and remote areas, and former principal of Wenona School, a private day and boarding school for girls.

== Career ==
Scott worked for the New South Wales Greiner Liberal government, as chief of staff to the Education Minister, Virginia Chadwick, and as a senior adviser to education minister, Terry Metherell.

From 2006 to 2016, he served as the ABC's managing director. His time at the ABC was marked by extensive change, including the creation of ABC Me, a digital TV channel for children, and the 24-hour news channel ABC News, as well as a major expansion into digital and on-line technology and an expansion of quality drama. Scott has been a strong defender of the value of social media in journalism and skeptical on the capacity of news organisations to charge for content they have previously provided free of charge.

In November 2014, as managing director of the Australian Broadcasting Corporation, Scott announced that after 55 years, the Collinswood ABC television studios in South Australia would be closed. The announcement, following the 2011 demolition of the ABC TV facility in Perth and the 2012 closure of Tasmania's TV production unit also revealed the end of state based current affairs show 7.30 Report (state editions) - formally Stateline.

Responding to 2014 Liberal government budget cuts of $254 million over 5 years, Mark Scott axed ABC Radio National program Bush Telegraph and five regional radio outposts. In a senate inquiry about the cuts, Scott rejected claims that ABC management was using the Abbott government's cuts as an excuse to pursue unpopular cost-saving initiatives.

In September 2015, Scott announced he would be retiring as managing director and would be leaving the ABC. In December 2015, Michelle Guthrie was announced as Scott's replacement, and took over the role on 2 May 2016.

In June 2016, Scott was appointed secretary of the New South Wales Department of Education. He was responsible for more than 2000 schools and around 49,000 teachers in the state.

Scott is the author of On Us, published in 2019 by Melbourne University Press.

In March 2021, Scott was announced as being appointed the 27th Vice-Chancellor of the University of Sydney, commencing in July 2021.

From 2022 to 2023, Scott chaired the Australian Government’s Teacher Education Expert Panel, which delivered its final report in July 2023.

== Awards and honours ==
On 13 June 2011, Scott was named an Officer of the Order of Australia for distinguished service to media and communications, and to the community through advisory and governance roles with a range of social justice and educational bodies.

== See also ==
- Claudine Gay
- Sally Kornbluth
- Liz Magill

Media offices
| Preceded by Russell Balding | Managing Director of the Australian Broadcasting Corporation; 2006–2016 | Succeeded by Michelle Guthrie |
