= Australian Broadcasting Corporation =

Public broadcaster

- Logo used since 2018

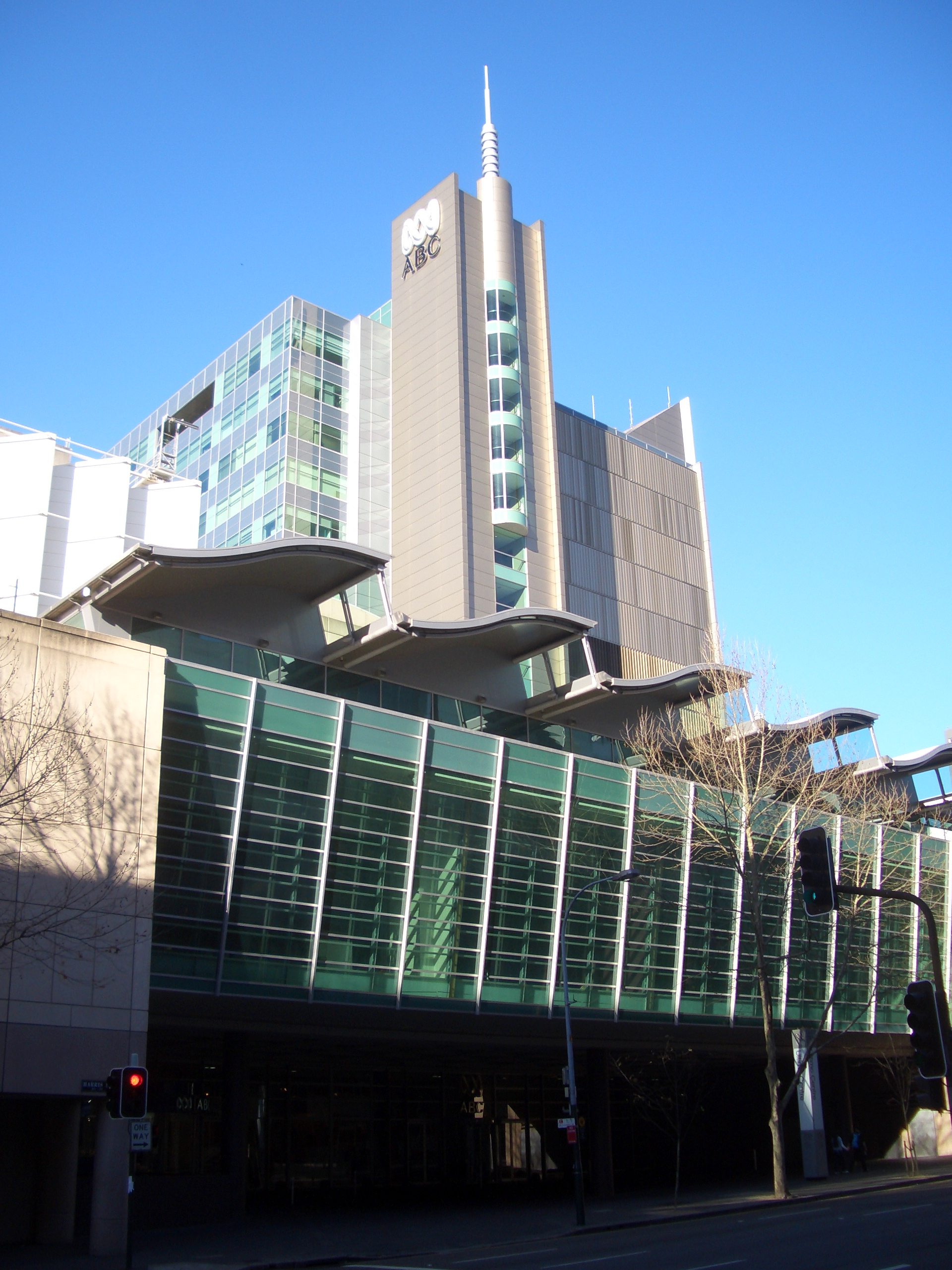
- ABC headquarters in Ultimo
- Formerly: Australian Broadcasting Commission (1932–1983)
- Type: Public service broadcaster
- Predecessors: Australian Broadcasting Company
- Founded: 1 July 1932; 94 years ago (as Australian Broadcasting Commission)
- Founder: Lyons government
- Headquarters: 700 Harris Street, Ultimo, Sydney, Australia
- Area served: Australia and worldwide
- Key people: Kim Williams (Chairman); Hugh Marks (Managing Director)
- Operating income: $1.137 billion (2024)
- Net income: –$2.2 million (2024)
- Owner: Australian Government
- Number of employees: 4,682 (Note: Including Ongoing and Non-ongoing employees as at 28 August 2024.) (2024)
- Divisions: ABC News; ABC Radio; ABC Television; ABC Sport; ABC Music; ABC Commercial
- Website: www.abc.net.au
- Footnotes; Annual Report 2024

The Australian Broadcasting Corporation (ABC) is an Australian public broadcaster. It operates across television, radio, and the web to provide news and current affairs, emergency information, entertainment and factual programming to regional and metropolitan Australia. The ABC is funded by tax revenue and grants from the federal government, though it also generates minor funding via ABC Commercial. It has a government-appointed board of directors and a remit to be politically independent and accountable. (Note: The ABC's remit is outlined in the Public Interest Disclosure Act 2013 and the Public Governance, Performance and Accountability Act 2013, with its charter enshrined in the Australian Broadcasting Corporation Act 1983.)

The ABC was founded in 1932, replacing the private Australian Broadcasting Company, which provided programming for certain radio stations. It was initially financed with a licence fee, but the Chifley government saw this as inefficient due to Australia's small population and vast service area; it became taxpayer-funded in 1949. The ABC is one of two public service broadcasters in Australia, alongside the SBS.

Its news division, ABC News, is Australia's most trusted and most relied-on news outlet, providing content to its television, radio, and online platforms. ABC Television operates five free-to-air channels, including ABC TV and ABC Entertains, while ABC Australia broadcasts to the Asia-Pacific. It has an expansive radio presence, with ABC Local Radio operating 45 regional and eight metropolitan stations, along with its four national networks, Radio National, ABC Classic, ABC NewsRadio and Triple J. It also provides the free streaming services ABC iview and ABC listen.

The postal address of the ABC in every Australian capital city is PO Box 9994, as a tribute to the record-breaking Test batting average of Australian cricketer Don Bradman.

== History ==
=== Origins ===
After public radio stations were established independently in the state capitals from 1924, a licensing scheme administered by the Postmaster-General's Department was established, allowing certain stations (with "Class A" licences") government funding, albeit with restrictions placed on their advertising content. In 1928, the government established the National Broadcasting Service to take over the 12 A-Class licences as they came up for renewal, and contracted the Australian Broadcasting Company, a private company established in 1924, to supply programs to the new national broadcaster.

After it became politically unpopular to continue to allow the Postmaster-General to run the National Broadcasting Service, the government established the Australian Broadcasting Commission (ABC) on 1 July 1932, under the Australian Broadcasting Commission Act 1932. to take over the Australian Broadcasting Company and run the National Broadcasting Service.

The ABC became informally referred to as "Aunty", originally in imitation of the British Broadcasting Corporation's nickname. The structure and programming was broadly modelled on the British Broadcasting Corporation, and programs not created in Australia were mostly bought in from the BBC.

In 1940, one of the ABC Board's most prominent members, Dick Boyer, was appointed to the ABC, becoming chairman on 1 April 1945. Today known for the continuing series of Boyer Lectures he initiated in 1959, he had a good but not too close working relationship with Sir Charles Moses (general manager 1935–1965), and remained chair until his retirement in 1961. He was determined to maintain the autonomy of the ABC.

=== 1950–2000 ===
The first broadcast of ABC TV, presented by Michael Charlton, 5 November 1956

James Dibble reading the first ABC News television bulletin in NSW, 1956

The ABC started television broadcasting in 1956. ABN-2 in Sydney was inaugurated by prime minister Robert Menzies on 5 November 1956, with the first broadcast presented by Michael Charlton, and James Dibble reading the first television news bulletin. Television relay facilities were not in place until the early 1960s, so news bulletins had to be sent to each capital city by teleprinter, to be prepared and presented separately in each city. In 1975, colour television was permanently introduced into Australia, and within a decade, the ABC had moved into satellite broadcasting, greatly enhancing its ability to distribute content nationally.

In 1975 the ABC introduced a 24-hour-a-day AM rock station in Sydney, 2JJ (Double Jay), which was eventually expanded into the national Triple J FM network. A year later, a national classical music network was established on the FM band, broadcasting from Adelaide. It was initially known as ABC-FM (later ABC Classic FM) – referring both to its "fine music programming and radio frequency".

ABC budget cuts began in 1976 and continued until 1998, the largest cuts (calculated by the ABC as 25% in real terms) coming between 1985 and 1996.

The Australian Broadcasting Corporation Act 1983 changed the organisation's name to the Australian Broadcasting Corporation, effective 1 July 1983. Although funded and owned by the government, the ABC remains editorially independent as ensured by the 1983 Act. At the same time, the newly formed corporation underwent significant restructuring, including a split into separate television and radio divisions, and ABC Radio was restructured significantly again in 1985. Geoffrey Whitehead was the managing director of the ABC at this time. Following his resignation in 1986, David Hill (at the time chair of the ABC Board) took over his position and local production trebled from 1986 to 1991.

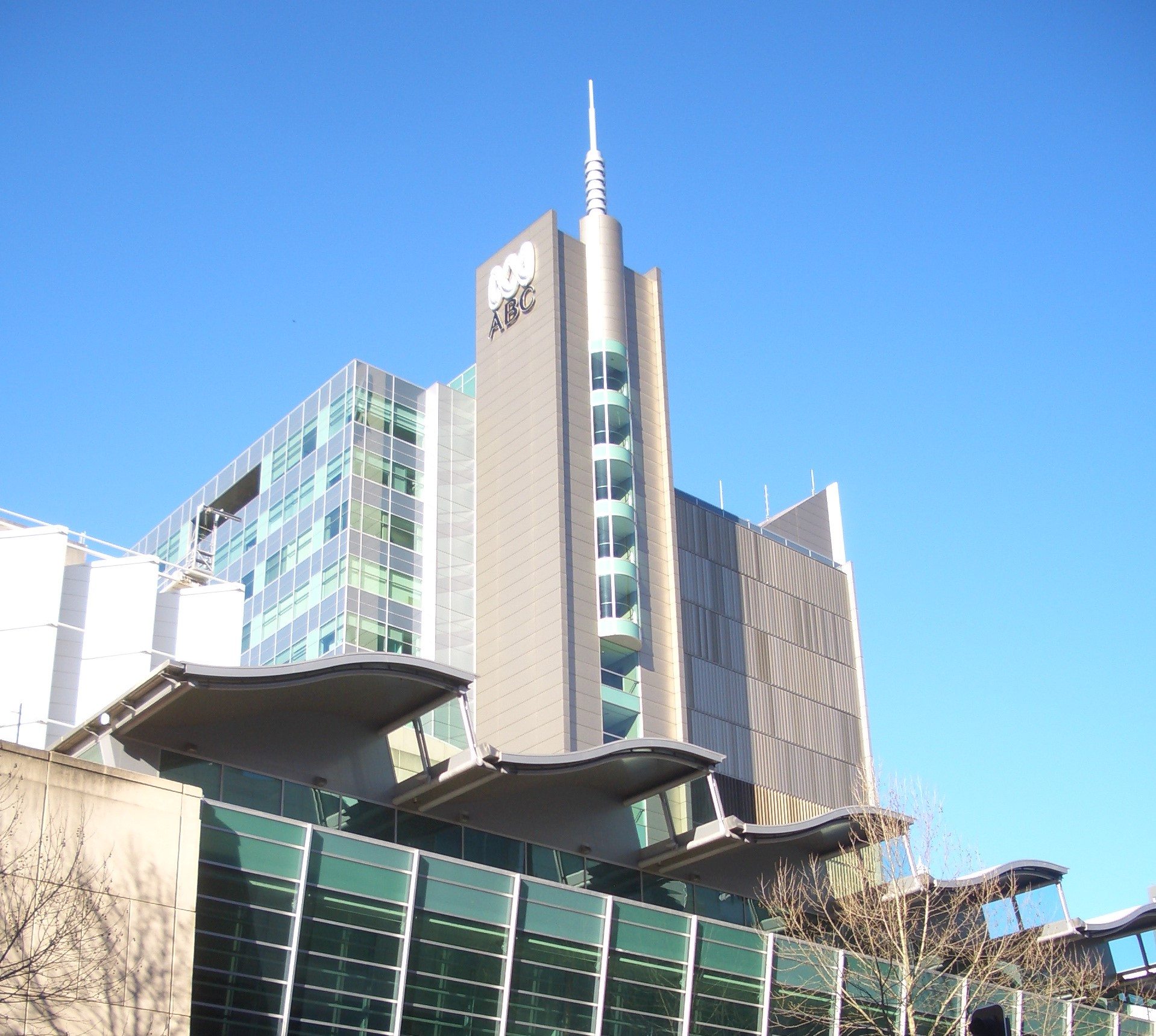
Ultimo Centre – the ABC's national headquarters in Sydney

Live television broadcasts of selected parliamentary sessions started in 1990, and by the early 1990s, all major ABC broadcasting outlets operated 24 hours a day.

In 1991, the corporation's Sydney radio and orchestral operations moved to a new building, the ABC Ultimo Centre, in the inner-city suburb of Ultimo that was opened by Prime Minister Bob Hawke. In Melbourne, the ABC Southbank Centre was completed in 1994.

International television service ABC Australia was established in 1993, while at the same time Radio Australia increased its international reach. Reduced funding in 1997 for Radio Australia resulted in staff and programming cuts.

The ABC was registered on the Australian Business Register as a Commonwealth Government Entity on 1 November 1999.

=== 2000s–2010s ===
In 2001, the ABC launched two digital television channels, ABC Kids and Fly TV, though these were axed just two years later.

In 2002, the ABC launched ABC Asia Pacific, the replacement for the defunct Australia Television International operated previously by the Seven Network. A digital radio service, ABC DiG (now Double J), was also launched in November that year.

On 8 February 2008, ABC TV was rebranded as ABC1, and a new channel for children, ABC3 (now ABC Entertains), was funded and announced by the Rudd government in June. A new online video on demand service launched in July of the same year, titled ABC iview.

ABC News 24 (now ABC News Channel), a channel dedicated to news, launched on 22 July 2010.

In November 2014, a cut of $254 million (4.6%) to funding over the following five years together with the additional unfunded cost of the news channel meant that the ABC would have to shed about 10% of its staff, around 400 people. There were several programming changes, with regional and local programming losing out to national programs, and the Adelaide TV production studio had to close.

In November 2016, the ABC announced that ABC News 24, ABC NewsRadio, as well as its online and digital news brands, would be rebranded under a unified ABC News brand, which was launched on 10 April 2017.

Michelle Guthrie took over from managing director Mark Scott, whose second five-year contract finished in April 2016. Between July 2017 and June 2018, the whole of the ABC underwent an organisational restructure, after which the Radio and Television Divisions were no longer separate entities each under a director, instead being split across several functional divisions, with different teams producing different genres of content for television, radio and digital platforms. The Entertainment & Specialist (E&S) team focussed on comedy, kids' programs, drama, Indigenous-related programs, music, other entertainment and factual content; the new ABC Specialist team created content across the arts, science, religion & ethics, education and society & culture; while the Regional & Local team focussed on regional and local content.

In September 2018, Guthrie was fired. A leadership crisis ensued after allegations arose that chair, Justin Milne, had, according to the MEAA, engaged in "overt political interference in the running of the ABC that is in clear breach of the ABC charter and the role of the chairperson" by interfering in editorial and staffing matters. After pressure for an independent inquiry or statement from Milne, or his resignation, following meetings by ABC staff in various locations, on 27 September Milne resigned.

In February 2019, after the roles of ABC chair and managing director had been vacant for more than four months, Ita Buttrose was named chair. Buttrose named David Anderson as managing director in May 2019.

On 5 June 2019, Australian Federal Police (AFP) raided the headquarters of the ABC looking for articles written in 2017 about alleged misconduct by Australian special forces in Afghanistan, later dubbed the Afghan Files. The raid was countered by lawyers for the ABC in litigation against the AFP, challenging the examination of over 9,200 documents, including internal emails. In February 2020, the case was dismissed by the federal court. In June 2020, the AFP sent a brief of evidence to the Commonwealth Director of Public Prosecutions (CDPP), the federal public prosecutor, recommending charges be laid against journalist Dan Oakes for breaking the Afghan Files story, but in October 2020, the CDPP dropped the case.

=== 2020s ===
In June 2020, the ABC announced it needed to cut 229 jobs, a number of programs, and reduce its travel and production budgets after the Turnbull government's announcement of a freeze to indexation of its budget in 2018.

In all, over a five-year period there were 737 redundancies, a further 866 resignations, and 203 retirements; but the total number of staff only fell by 313 due to the ABC hiring 650 staff over that period.

In December 2021, the ABC announced that, in addition to the 83 additional positions already established, it was to create an additional "50-plus" new jobs in regional Australia as a result of commercial agreements with digital platforms flowing from the Morrison government's News Media Bargaining Code.

In May 2024, the ABC started moving from its Ultimo office to a new office in Parramatta Square. Plans for the move were first released in 2021, as a cost-cutting venture. The first program to be broadcast from the new studio in Parramatta was ABC Radio Sydney Mornings.

In March 2026, staff at ABC began a one-day strike over pay and working conditions. This was their first walk-out in 20 years.

== Branding ==
The Lissajous curve logo, as it appeared on some properties since October 1974–2002, and was reintroduced from 2014 onwards

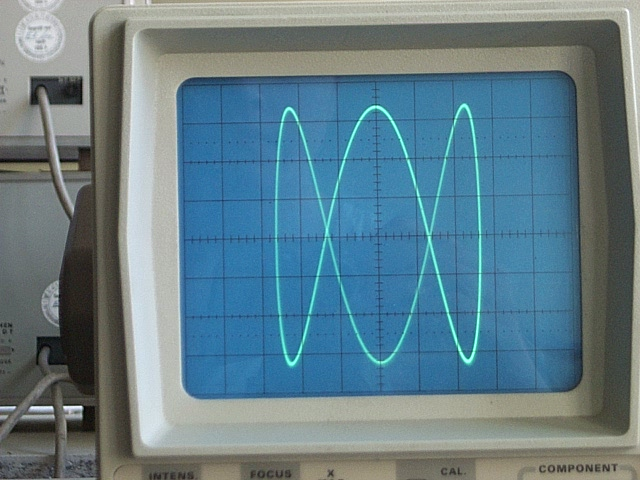
Lissajous figure on an oscilloscope, on which Bill Kennard designed the current logo

The ABC logo is one of the most recognisable logos in Australia. In the early years of television, the ABC had been using Lissajous curves as fillers between programmes.

In 1961, prior to the adoption of an official corporate logo, the ABC commissioned Tasmanian artist George Davis to create a large mosaic mural for its new Hobart studios at 5–7 Sandy Bay Road. The abstract design, composed of more than 150,000 glass tiles and spanning 19 metres (62 ft), was prominently displayed on the building's façade. Observers and later commentators have noted similarities between the mural's sinuous linework and the ABC's eventual logo, with some suggesting it may have served as a visual influence.

In July 1963, the ABC conducted a staff competition to create a new logo for use on television, stationery, publications, microphone badges and ABC vehicles. In 1965, ABC graphics designer Bill Kennard submitted a design representing a Lissajous display, as generated when a sine wave signal is applied to the "X" input of an oscilloscope and another at three times the frequency at the "Y" input. The letters "ABC" were added to the design and it was adopted as the ABC's official logo. Kennard was presented with £25 (about AU$850 in 2024) for his design.

On 19 October 1974, the Lissajous curve design experienced its first facelift with the line thickened to allow for colour to be used. It would also be treated to the 'over and under' effect, showing the crossover of the line in the design. To celebrate its 70th anniversary on 1 July 2002, the ABC adopted a new logo, which was created by (Annette) Harcus Design in 2001. This logo used a silver 3D texture but the crossover design was left intact and was then used across the ABC's media outlets. After the on-air revival of the 1974 logo since 2014, the ABC gradually reinstated the classic symbol. The most recent change happened in February 2018, with a new logotype and brand positioning under its tagline, Yours. The 2002 silver logo is no longer in use by the corporation.

== Governance ==
The operations of the ABC are governed by a board of directors, consisting of a managing director, five to seven directors, and until 2006, a staff-elected director. The managing director is appointed by the board for a period of up to five years, but is eligible for renewal. The authority and guidelines for the appointment of directors is provided for in the Australian Broadcasting Corporation Act 1983.

Appointments to the ABC Board made by successive governments have often resulted in criticism of the appointees' political affiliation, background, and relative merit. Past appointments have associated directly with political parties – five of fourteen appointed chairmen have been accused of political affiliation or friendship, include Richard Downing and Ken Myer (both of whom publicly endorsed the Australian Labor Party at the 1972 election), as well as Sir Henry Bland, David Hill was close to Neville Wran, while Donald McDonald was considered to be a close friend of John Howard.

From 2003, the Howard government made several controversial appointments to the ABC Board, including prominent ABC critic Janet Albrechtsen, Ron Brunton, and Keith Windschuttle.

During their 2007 federal election campaign, Labor announced plans to introduce a new system, similar to that of the BBC, for appointing members to the board. Under the new system, candidates for the ABC Board would be considered by an independent panel established "at arm's length" from the Communications Minister. If the minister chose someone not on the panel's shortlist, they would be required to justify this to parliament. The ABC chairman would be nominated by the prime minister and endorsed by the leader of the opposition. A new merit-based appointment system was announced on 16 October 2008, in advance of the new triennial funding period starting in 2009.

In 2013, the Coalition government introduced a merit-based system for appointing the board based on the recommendations of a nominations panel. However, the panel was ultimately only advisory, with almost all of the board members in 2018 directly appointed by the Communications minister, despite some being rejected by the panel or not being considered at all.

ABC Board members as of January 2025
| Name | Functional role | Start of term | Reference |
|---|---|---|---|
| Kim Williams | Chairman | 7 March 2024 | Term ends 6 March 2029 |
| Hugh Marks | Managing Director | 10 March 2025 | Term ends 9 March 2030 |
| Laura Tingle | Staff-elected director | 1 May 2023 | Term ends 30 April 2028 |
| Nicolette Maury | | 16 October 2023 | Term ends 15 October 2028 |
| Georgie Somerset | Deputy Chair | 23 February 2017 | Term ends 22 February 2027 |
| Louise McElvogue | | 16 October 2023 | Term ends 15 October 2028 |
| Mario D'Orazio | | 13 May 2021 | Term ends 12 May 2026 |
| Katrina Sedgwick | | 2 October 2024 | Term ends 1 October 2029 |

== Revenue ==
The ABC is primarily funded by the Australian government, in addition to some revenue received from commercial offerings and its retail outlets. The ABC's funding system is set and reviewed every three years.

=== Taxpayer funding ===
In the early 1920s there existed two forms of radio licences, A and B. Those with A licences were funded by listener fees, and those with B by commercial advertising. It was tied to 'sealed set' system in which listeners would purchase a radio receiver and then pay a subscription to continue to listen to it; its implementation was a cross between the BBC's licence fee and more commercially supported radio, such as those found in the US. This continued until the Report of the Royal Commission on Wireless together with appendices was published on the 5 October 1927, which recommended in its summary that it should issue no further A radio licences alongside pooling resources to improve programmes and secure an efficient service to the public.

The Australian government decided in July 1928 against the recommendations in the Royal Commission and nationalised stations with A licences. By 1929 the government had nationalised the provision of transmission and contracted the delivery of programming to the conglomerate Australian Broadcasting Company. By 1932, 12 stations had been nationalised, and in May of that year the Commonwealth government passed the Australian Broadcasting Commission Act 1932. Under the act a new public broadcaster was created, it was funded directly by listener fees until 1948 and run by a five-member commission with the Postmaster-General's Department responsible for the technical aspects. Amendments were also made to the Australian Broadcasting Act 1983 which meant the ABC would receive its funding directly from the federal government.

From 1956 to 1974 a combined licence for TV and radio was required.

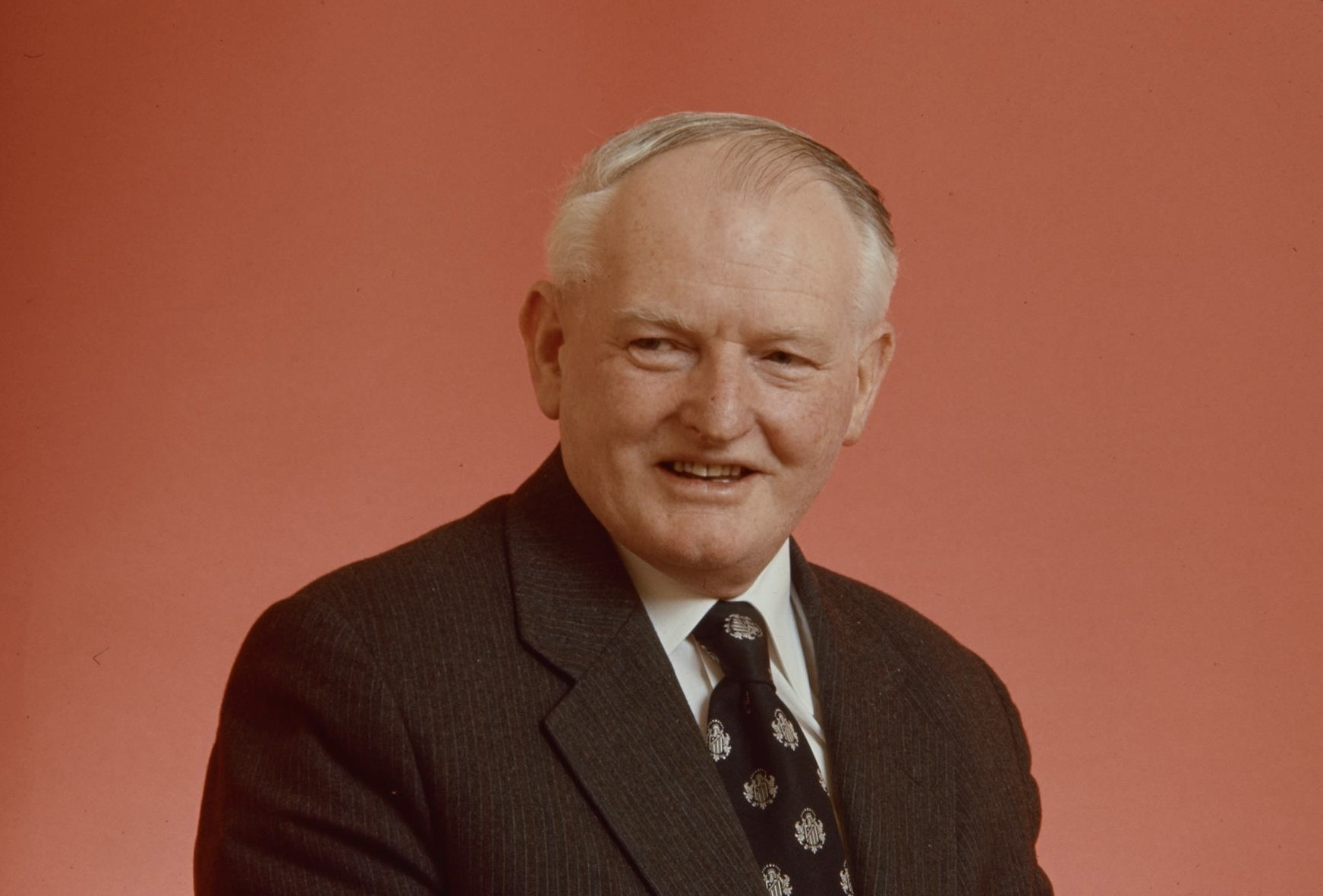
Frank Crean used the 1974–75 Budget to proclaim that public broadcasting should be funded by the taxation system, not by a license fee which targeted the less affluent disproportionately.

Licence fees remained until 18 September 1974, when they were abolished by the Whitlam Labor government, on the basis that the licence fee represented a poll tax and in turn cost more for the less affluent. Its abolishment was introduced by Frank Crean in his 1974 budget speech. It was also considered too costly to monitor compliance. In 1976 The Sydney Morning Herald reported that the federal cabinet was considering reintroducing a licence for TV. This never eventuated.

In 2014, the ABC absorbed $254 million in federal budget deficits.

In the 2018–19 budget handed down by then-Treasurer Scott Morrison, the ABC was subject to a pause of indexation of operation funding, saving the federal government a total of $83.7 million over 3 years. In fiscal year 2016–17, the ABC received $861 million in federal funding, which increased to $865 million per year from 2017 to 2018 to 2018–19, representing a cut in funding of $43 million over three years when accounting for inflation. In the 2019–20 federal budget funding was around $3.2 billion over three years ($1.06 billion per year) for the ABC. The Enhanced Newsgathering Fund, a specialised fund for regional and outer-suburban news gathering set up in 2013 by the Gillard government, was $44 million over three years as of the 2019–20 budget, a reduction of $28 million per year since the 2016 Australian federal election. This came after speculation that the fund would be removed, to which Acting managing director David Anderson wrote to Communications Minister Mitch Fifield expressing concerns.

Despite the cuts made by Prime Minister Tony Abbott and Communications Minister Malcolm Turnbull and the freeze introduced by Prime Minister Malcolm Turnbull and Communications Minister Mitch Fifield, the ABC itself has published financial data that shows an increase in the taxpayer appropriation to the ABC of 10% in real terms (i.e. above inflation) between 1998 and 2021.

In 2023, fulfilling one of Labor's election pledges, the ABC moved into a five instead of three-year funding term.

The term "where your 8 cents a day goes", coined in the late 1980s during funding negotiations, is often used in reference to the services provided by the ABC. It was estimated that the cost of the ABC per head of population per day was 7.1 cents a day, based on the corporation's 2007–08 "base funding" of A$543 million.

=== ABC Commercial ===
The commercial arm of the ABC was established in 1974 under the name Enterprises as a self-funding unit, marketing products relating to the ABC's activities. It was renamed in 2007 to ABC Commercial, The aim of ABC Commercial was "to create, market and retail high quality consumer products which reflect and extend the scope of the ABC's activities". At this time it comprised the ABC Shop, ABC Consumer Publishing and Content Sales, ABC Resource Hire, and ABC Content Services (Archives).

ABC Commercial was registered as a business name under Australian Broadcasting Corporation in April 2007 and continues to exist as of June 2021. It includes ABC Music, a leading independent record label; ABC Events, which stages concerts and other events; and publishing and licensing activities by ABC Books, ABC Audio, ABC Magazines and ABC Licensing.

ABC Shop Online was wound up at the end of 2018, along with the in-store ABC Centres. In early 2019, ABC Commercial split from the Finance division and became an independent business unit of the ABC.

In the financial year 2018–2019, ABC Commercial turned a profit of A$4.4 million, which was invested in content production.

The ABC Studios and Media Production hires out some of the ABC studios and sound stages, operating as part of ABC Commercial. The studios for hire are in Sydney (Studios 21, 22, 16), Melbourne (31), Adelaide (51B) and Perth (61).

== Independence and impartiality ==
Under the Australian Broadcasting Corporation Act 1983, the ABC Board is bound to "maintain the independence and integrity of the Corporation" and to ensure that "the gathering and presentation by the Corporation of news and information is accurate and impartial according to the recognised standards of objective journalism".

The ABC's editorial policy on impartiality requires it to take "no editorial stance other than its commitment to fundamental democratic principles including the rule of law, freedom of speech and religion, parliamentary democracy and non-discrimination". The ABC follows the following "hallmarks of impartiality": "a balance that follows the weight of evidence, fair treatment, open-mindedness and opportunities over time for principal relevant perspectives on matters of contention to be expressed".

The editorial policy on diversity also requires the broadcaster "to present, over time, content that addresses a broad range of subjects from a diversity of perspectives reflecting a diversity of experiences, presented in a diversity of ways from a diversity of sources". However, it also notes that this "does not require that every perspective receives equal time, nor that every facet of every argument is presented".

== Services ==
=== Radio ===
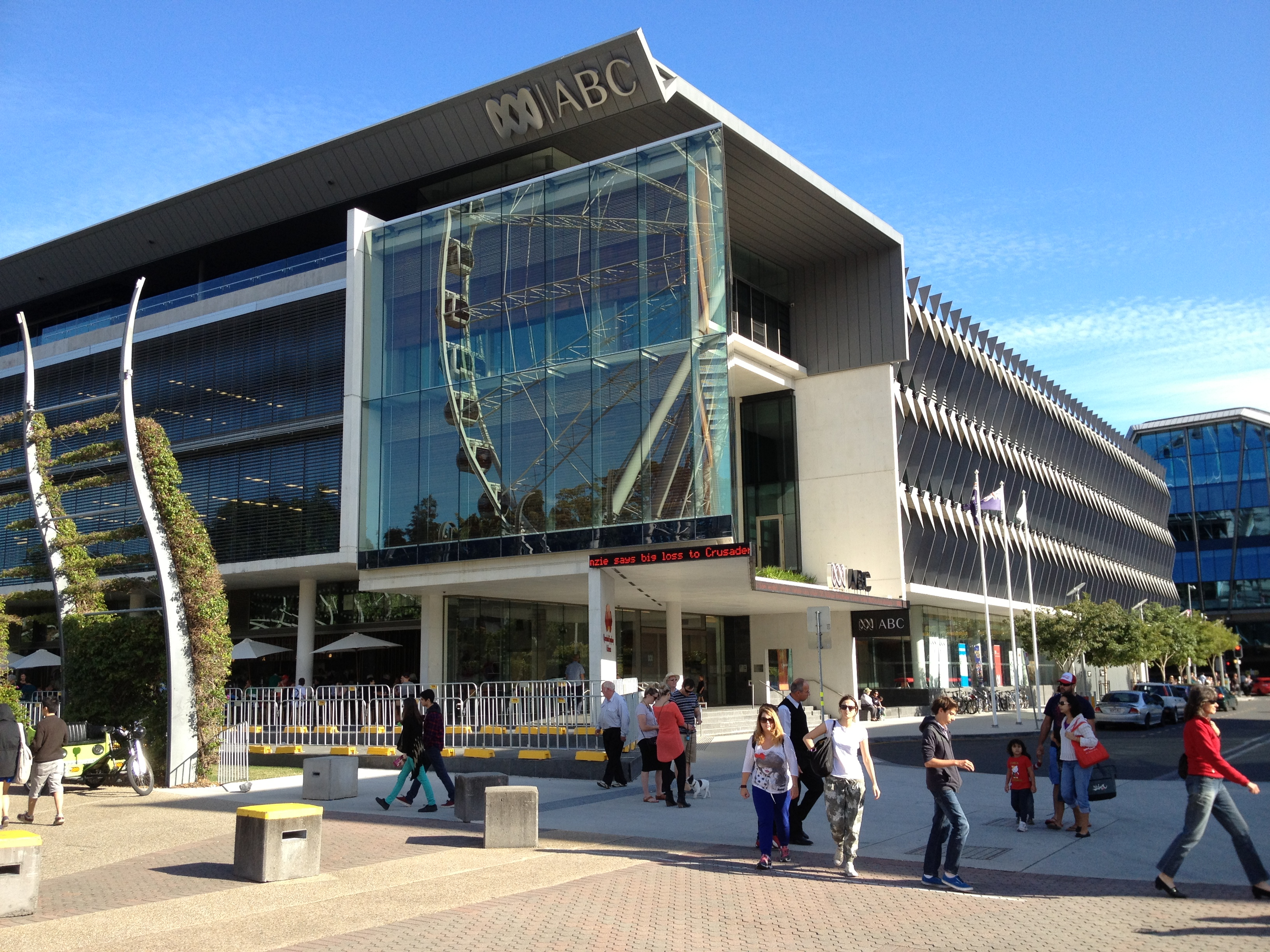
ABC Radio Brisbane headquarters in South Bank

The ABC operates four national radio stations and 53 local stations servicing the eight capital cities and 45 regional areas. These stations mainly consist of locally presented light entertainment, news, talk back, music, sport and interviews, but also simulcast national programs like AM, PM, The World Today, Nightlife and sporting events.

The ABC's national stations are:

- Radio National – A generalist station broadcasting more than 60 special interest programmes per week covering a range of topics including music, comedy, book readings, radio dramas, poetry, science, health, the arts, religion, social history and current affairs.
- ABC NewsRadio – A news service broadcasting federal parliamentary sittings and news on a 24/7 format with updates on the quarter-hour. Broadcasts news content produced by the ABC itself, as well as programs relayed from Radio Australia, the BBC World Service, NPR, Deutsche Welle, Radio Netherlands Worldwide and CNN.
- ABC Classic – A classical music station which also plays some jazz and world music. ABC Classic was the ABC's first FM radio service.
- Triple J – A youth-oriented radio network, with a strong focus on alternative and independent music, especially Australian artists.

Additionally, the ABC hosts several stations exclusive to digital radio and streaming. These include ABC Country, ABC Jazz, Double J and Triple J Unearthed.

=== Television ===
The ABC operates five national television channels:

- ABC TV – The corporation's original television service, receives the bulk of funding for television and shows first-run comedy, drama, documentaries, and news and current affairs. In each state and territory a local news bulletin is shown at 7:00 pm nightly.
- ABC Family – Airing content aimed at late-primary school and early-high school children and families. It does not broadcast 24 hours a day, but is broadcast daily from 7:30 pm to around 3:00 am the following night. The channel shares airspace with the ABC Kids programming block from 4:00 am to 7:30 pm.
- ABC Entertains – General entertainment programming mainly for adults, with some teenage content in the morning. It broadcasts 24 hours a day.
- ABC Kids – Preschool children's block featuring children's programming aimed at the 0–5 age groups. ABC Kids broadcasts during ABC Family downtime, from 4:00 am to 7:30 pm daily.
- ABC News Channel – A 24-hour news channel, featuring programming from the ABC News division, selected programs from BBC News, coverage of the federal parliament's Question time, documentaries and factual, arts programming and state or national election coverage.

Although the ABC's headquarters in Sydney serve as a base for program distribution nationally, ABC Television network is composed of eight state and territory based stations, each based in their respective state capital and augmented by repeaters:

- ABN (Sydney)
- ABV (Melbourne)
- ABQ (Brisbane)
- ABS (Adelaide)
- ABW (Perth)
- ABT (Hobart)
- ABC (Canberra)
- ABD (Darwin)

The eight ABC stations carry opt outs for local programming. In addition to the nightly 7:00 pm news, the stations also broadcast state election coverage, and in most areas, live sport on Saturday afternoons.

=== News ===
ABC News is the public broadcaster's primary news gathering division. It is responsible for all coverage across the organisation's various television, radio, and online platforms. Some of the services included under the auspices of the division are its 24-hour news television channel ABC News Channel and news radio station ABC NewsRadio, as well as its news programs AM, The World Today, and PM, and news bulletins on ABC Local Radio, Radio National, ABC Classic, and Triple J.

ABC News is Australia's most trusted news source, according to a 2025 report by the Australian Communications and Media Authority. 60 percent of Australians trust the outlet. It is also the most relied-on news division. ABC News is highly trusted within the Pacific region.

=== Sport ===
The ABC Sport division provides sports programming across the ABC's radio, television and online channels. This includes commentary across a wide range of codes, but also panel shows like Offsiders and sports comedies like Bludging on the Blindside.

=== Emergency ===
The ABC is Australia's only dedicated national emergency broadcaster. Its team operates 365 days a year and provides rolling coverage of natural disasters like bushfires and floods. It accesses the resources of the Australian Fire and Emergencies Council Public Information and Warnings Group. Any of the ABC's 55 studios nationwide can be used to deliver warnings, which can be transmitted to specific Local Radio stations in areas affected. Radio broadcasting becomes especially important when wild weather affects internet and power access.

=== Internet ===
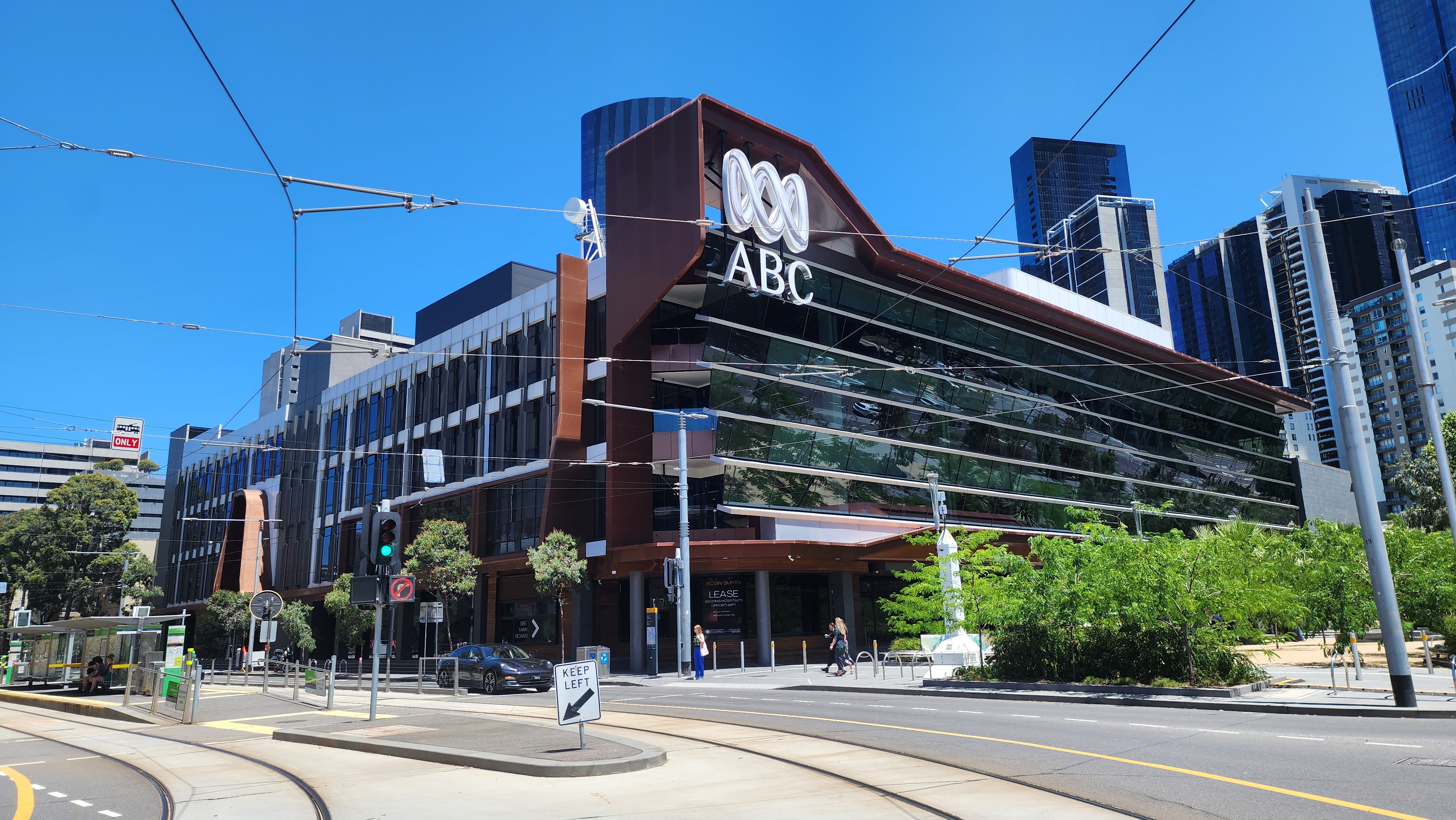
ABC office in Southbank, Melbourne

The ABC operates two free streaming services:

- ABC iview: Video on demand service available via the website or app, which enables streaming of all ABC television stations and catch-up on programmes.
- ABC listen: Streaming service available via the website or app, which enables streaming of all ABC radio stations, plus podcasts and other audio programmes. Launched in 2012 as the ABC Radio app.

The ABC's online operations were launched on 14 August 1995. It provided live, online election coverage for the first time in 1996, and limited news content began to be provided in 1997.

The ABC first began to publish podcasts in December 2004, and by mid-2006, the broadcaster had become an international leader in the medium, with over 50 programmes delivering hundreds of thousands of downloads per week, including trial video podcasts of The Chaser's War on Everything and Triple J TV.

ABC Pool was a website launched in August 2008, a participatory media project which encouraged users to upload and share content that others could remix and collaborate on using Creative Commons licenses.

ABC News is one of Australia's largest and most-visited news websites; from its position as 11th most popular in the country in 2008, in recent years up to 2021 it has maintained its top position in the rankings.

In June 2023, the broadcaster released its five-year plan, outlining that it would move its resources away from radio and television, and instead dedicate these resources to improving and promoting its digital platforms.

=== International ===
ABC Australia is an international satellite television service operated by the ABC, funded by advertising and grants from the Department of Foreign Affairs and Trade. Aimed at the Asia-Pacific region, the service broadcasts a mixture of English language programming, including general entertainment, sport, and current affairs.

Radio Australia is an international satellite and internet radio service with transmissions aimed at Southeast Asia and the Pacific Islands, although its signals are also audible in many other parts of the world. It features programmes in various languages spoken in these regions, including Mandarin, Indonesian, Vietnamese, Khmer and Tok Pisin. Before 31 January 2017 Radio Australia broadcast short-wave radio signals. Radio Australia bulletins are also carried on WRN Broadcast, available via satellite in Europe and North America.

ABC International Development, or ABCID, is a media development unit that promotes public interest journalism and connects with local media in the region. ABCID employs local people in Papua New Guinea and many Pacific countries. The team "provides expertise, training, technical and program support to partner organisations", by working with a variety of organisations, including international development donors, for example through the Pacific Media Assistance Scheme (PACMAS).

=== Orchestras ===
"Majestic Fanfare"
The original ABC News and Current Affairs theme music. In the mid-1980s ABC Television changed to its own news theme, while the "Majestic Fanfare" is still used for radio news bulletins.

Up until the installation of disc recording equipment in 1935, all content broadcast on the ABC was produced live, including music. For this purpose the ABC established broadcasting orchestras in each state, and in some centres also employed choruses and dance bands. This became known as the ABC Concert Music Division, which was controlled by the Federal Director of Music – the first of whom was W. G. James.

In 1997, the ABC divested all ABC orchestras from the Concerts Department of the ABC into separate subsidiary companies, allied to a service company known as Symphony Australia, and on 1 January 2007 the orchestras were divested into independent companies. The six state orchestras are:

- Adelaide Symphony Orchestra
- Melbourne Symphony Orchestra
- Queensland Symphony Orchestra
- Sydney Symphony Orchestra
- Tasmanian Symphony Orchestra
- West Australian Symphony Orchestra

== Controversies ==
=== Defamation ===
In 2022 the ABC used edited combat footage on their 7:30 program to support their claims of alleged misconduct by Australian troops in Afghanistan. 5 additional gun shot sounds were added over footage of Australian Commandos in a helicopter to make it appear as if they were firing on unarmed civilians. The ABC would issue an apology and claim this was an editing error. An independent review concluded that the ABC did not intend to mislead audiences, however the review was conducted by one of the corporation's own former editorial directors.

In 2023, the ABC lost a defamation case against former commando Heston Russel where the corporation withdrew a truth defence and opted for the case to be heard under a public interest defence.

In the landmark ruling Justice Lee awarded Russell $390,000 in addition to interest and damages. Estimates of legal expenses ranged between $1.2 million and $3 million. The broadcaster did not take up an earlier settlement offer of $99,000 and removal of the published articles. The ABC managing director, David Anderson, who took home a six-figure pay rise shortly after the defamation case loss, outlined in senate estimates that he would not apologise to Russell for the false reporting.

Recordings of Mark Willacy's interviews that formed part of the defamation case were garnished as part of the legal discovery process. They were made available to Ben Fordham's 2GB radio program.

In December 2023, Antoinette Lattouf was hired for five days to fill in for Sarah Macdonald on ABC Radio Sydney and then sacked three days later after reposting a Human Rights Watch social media post regarding actions of Israeli soldiers in the Israel-Gaza war. Two days later Lattouf initiated law action with the Fair Work Commission against the ABC for alleged racial discrimination. ABC members of the Media, Entertainment and Arts Alliance voted no confidence in Anderson partly due to WhatsApp messages that had come to light from a pro-Israel lobby group known as "Lawyers for Israel". The next day the ABC Board voted unanimous confidence in Anderson.

In March 2024. the ABC aired a documentary titled "Ukraine's War: The Other Side," by Sean Langan which has been criticised by Ukrainian ambassador Vasyl Myroshnychenko as the "journalistic equivalent of a bowl of vomit" and seemed to repeat Russian justification for the War in Ukraine and structured in a way that seems to favor the Russian side. The ABC has defended its position with a spokesperson stating "we believe Australian audiences also have the right to watch it and make up their own minds."

=== Perceived bias ===
External critics have complained in particular of left-wing political bias at the broadcaster, citing a prominence of Labor Party-connected journalists hosting masthead political programs or a tendency to favour "progressive" over "conservative" political views on issues such as immigration, asylum seekers, the republic, multiculturalism, Indigenous reconciliation, feminism, environmentalism, and same-sex marriage. Gerard Henderson has argued that the ABC is supportive of diversity in areas such as identity, race, gender and ethnicity, but not so strong on diversity of views.

In December 2013, former judge and ABC chair James Spigelman announced that four independent audits would be conducted each year in response to the allegations of bias in the reporting of news and current affairs. ABC Friends have observed that: "Most of the complaints about bias in the ABC have come from the government of the day – Labor or Liberal. Significantly both parties have been far less hostile to the ABC when in opposition".

==== Reviews and investigations ====
Reviews of the ABC are regularly commissioned and sometimes not released.

Both internal and external research has been conducted on the question of bias at the ABC. These include the following:

- A 2004 Roy Morgan media credibility survey found that journalists regarded ABC Radio as the most accurate news source in the country and the ABC as the second "most politically biased media organisation in Australia".
- A 2013 University of the Sunshine Coast study of the voting intentions of journalists found that 73.6% of ABC journalists supported Labor or the Greens – with 41% supporting the Greens (whereas only around 10% of people in the general population voted for the Greens).
- At the 2016 federal election, a study commissioned by the ABC's Election Coverage Review Committee and conducted by Isentia compiled share-of-voice data and found that the ABC devoted 42.6% of election coverage to the Coalition government (this compares to the 42.04% primary (first-preference) vote received by the Coalition in the House of Representatives (HOR)), 35.9% to the Labor opposition (34.73% HOR), 8% to the Greens (10.23% HOR), 3.1% to independents (1.85% HOR), 2.2% to the Nick Xenophon Team (1.85% HOR) and 8.1% to others. However, the ABC itself notes the "significant limitations around the value of share of voice data" as "duration says nothing about tone or context".
- In December 2020, the Board commissioned its 19th editorial review by an independent reviewer, which found that the ABC's news coverage of lead-up to the 2019 Australian election was "overwhelmingly positive and unbiased", although it also found that specific episodes of The Drum and Insiders reflected too narrow a range of viewpoints. The government forced the publication of the report after Coalition senator James McGrath raised a motion in the Senate, which led to ABC Chair Ita Buttrose and managing director David Anderson writing to the president of the Senate, Scott Ryan, to express their concerns about the use of the such powers, which went against the public interest.

The ABC has an Election Coverage Review Committee that supervises the allocation of available broadcasting time to political parties and checks broadcast content against their editorial policies. The ABC also has a Referendum Coverage Review Committee which performs similar functions to the Election Coverage Review Committee. These committees are convened when an electoral event is announced.

=== Relationships with government ===
Labor prime minister Bob Hawke considered the ABC's coverage of the 1991 Gulf War to be biased. In 1996, conservative opposition leader John Howard refused to have Kerry O'Brien of the ABC moderate the television debates with Labor prime minister Paul Keating because Howard saw O'Brien as biased against the Coalition.

Liberal Prime Minister Tony Abbott perceived the ABC to be left wing and hostile to his government, while Malcolm Turnbull enjoyed better relations with the national broadcaster. Turnbull's successor, Scott Morrison, once again presided over "strained" relations between the government and the ABC. Under Morrison's leadership, an investigation was launched into the ABC and its complaints-handling process—a decision which was criticised by Ita Buttrose as "political interference". The inquiry was abandoned the following June.

=== Specific topics ===
==== The Catholic Church and George Pell ====
The ABC's coverage of the issue of sexual abuse in the Catholic Church received praise and criticism. The Melbourne Press Club presented the 2016 Quill for Coverage of an Issue or Event for the report George Pell and Sexual Abuse in the Catholic Church, and the 2016 Golden Quill award to Louise Milligan and Andy Burns for their extensive coverage of Cardinal George Pell's evidence given at the Royal Commission into Institutional Responses to Child Sexual Abuse.

The ABC Media Watch program of 20 April 2020 noted that the ABC had been accused of leading a "witch hunt" against Cardinal Pell. Media Watch reported that, following his acquittal, Pell said the ABC gave an "overwhelming presentation of one view and only one view". Media Watch also canvassed other criticisms including from The Australian newspaper's editor-at-large Paul Kelly, who charged the ABC with having run a "sustained campaign against Pell". Media Watch also offered criticism of its own, noting Louise Milligan and the Four Corners program had failed to canvass any of Pell's defence from the trial and "lined up witnesses condemning Pell", while social media commentary by Barrie Cassidy and Quentin Dempster had undermined the presumption of innocence. Margaret Simons similarly noted in The Guardian that "there has been some social media activity by ABC journalists that looks very much like lobbying against Pell..."

==== Environmentalism ====
Planet Slayer was an ABC website run by scientist Bernie Hobbs to teach children about the environment in around 2008/09. It included a "Greenhouse Calculator" which aimed to help children to work out their carbon footprint by providing an estimate of the age a person needs to die if they are not to use more than their fair share of the Earth's resources. Victorian Liberal senator Mitch Fifield criticised a cartoon series on the site for portraying those who eat meat, loggers, and workers in the nuclear industry as "evil". ABC managing director Mark Scott said the site was not designed to offend anyone, but instead have children think about environmental issues.

==== Unlawful termination of Antoinette Lattouf ====
In September 2025, the Federal Court ruled that the ABC had unlawfully terminated journalist Antoinette Lattouf during a short-term presenting role at ABC Radio Sydney in December 2023, after she shared a Human Rights Watch post about the humanitarian situation in Gaza on her personal Instagram account. Justice Darryl Rangiah found the broadcaster had acted "to appease pro-Israel lobbyists" who organised a campaign of complaints, in breach of the Fair Work Act. The court ordered the ABC to pay Lattouf a total of $220,000 in compensation and penalties, and criticised the broadcaster for surrendering its independence and integrity to external pressure.

== ABC Friends ==
ABC Friends is a group of independent organisations in each state and territory that aim to defend and promote the role of the ABC as an independent and protected public service. The umbrella group was founded in 1976 by citizens who were concerned about government threats to make deep cuts to the ABC's budget. Thus, one of its key objectives is to ensure the ABC is properly funded to "maintain and advance its role as the national public broadcaster in all media, promoting and reflecting Australian culture and diversity."

== See also ==
- History of broadcasting in Australia
- Timeline of Australian radio
