= Michelle Guthrie =

Australian business executive and lawyer (born 1965)

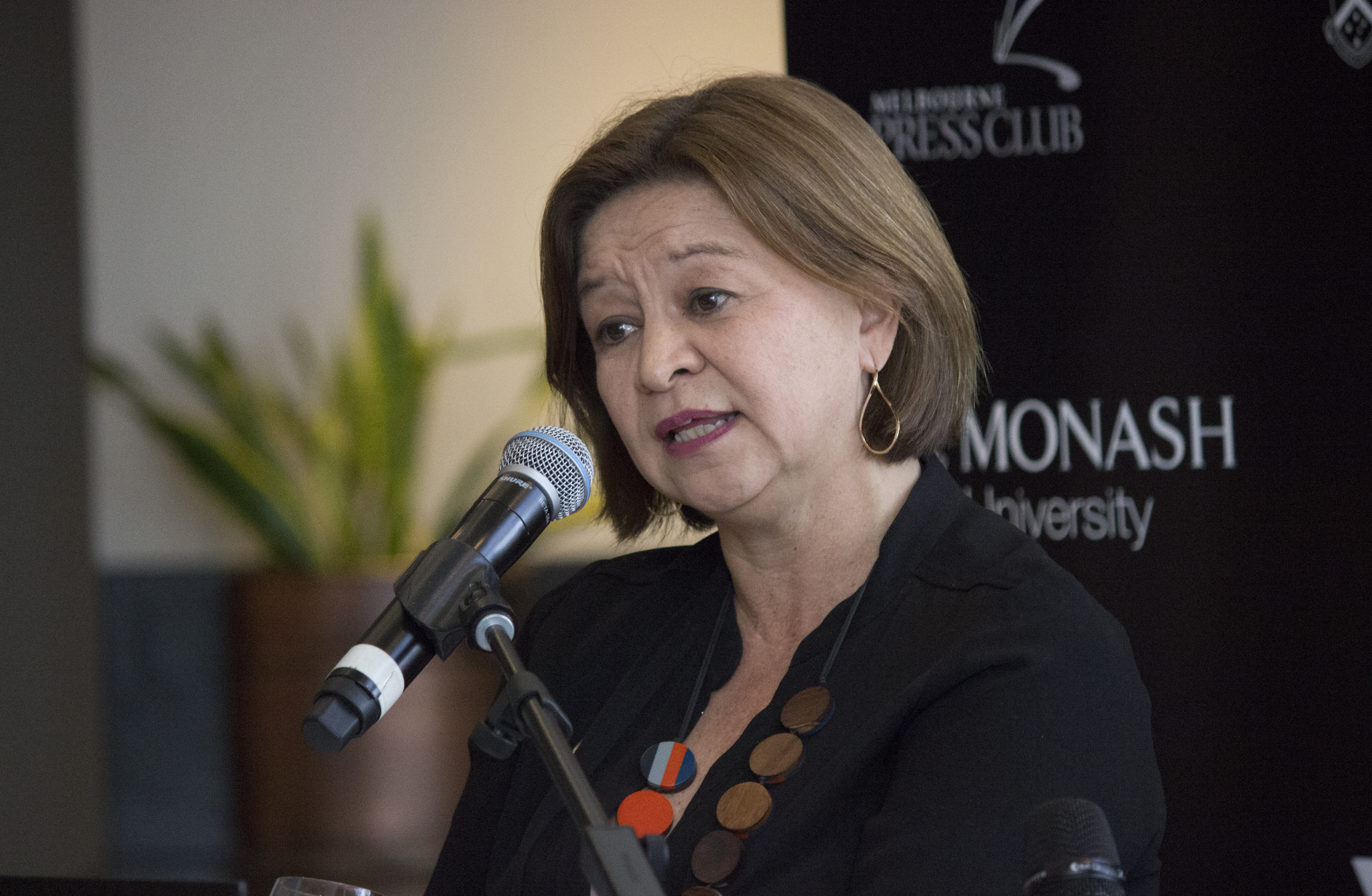
- Guthrie speaks at the Melbourne Press Club in 2018
- Born: 1965 (age 60–61)
- Education: Law degree University of Sydney
- Occupations: former managing director, ABC lawyer
- Employer: ABC – 2015–2018

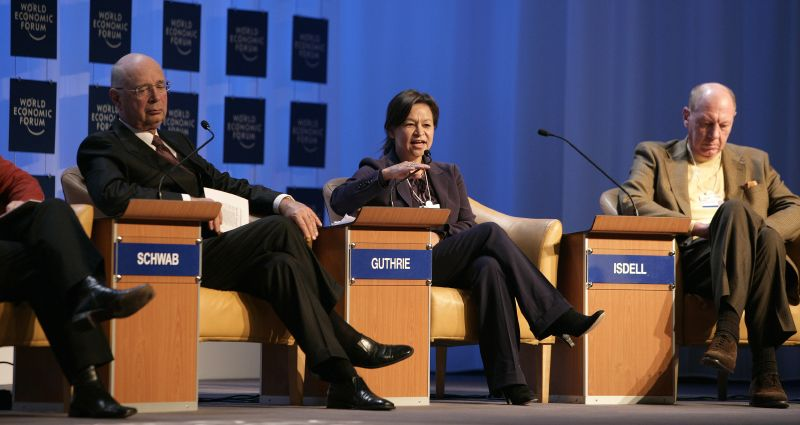
Michelle Guthrie (centre) speaking at the World Economic Forum Annual Meeting Davos 2007.

Michelle Guthrie (born 1965) is an Australian business executive and lawyer.

Guthrie was born in Sydney in 1965, was educated at Brigidine College Randwick and Kambala Girls' School, and studied arts and law at the University of Sydney. She joined the law firm Allen, Allen & Hemsley as a media and technology lawyer in Sydney and Singapore, then moved to London as a corporate counsel for News International. She remained with the News Corporation group of companies for thirteen years, returning to Australia for an 18-month stint as director of legal and business development for Foxtel, then to Hong Kong to replace James Murdoch as the CEO of STAR TV. In 2007, she became managing director of Providence Equity Partners in Hong Kong. In 2011, she joined Google as managing director of partner business solutions, and later was managing director for agencies for the Asia-Pacific region, based in the company's Singapore office.

In December 2015, it was announced that Guthrie would become managing director of the Australian Broadcasting Corporation (ABC), replacing Mark Scott who retired in April 2016. Guthrie assumed the ABC position on 2 May 2016. She has been criticised for her lack of understanding of public broadcasting and journalism.

On 24 September 2018, ABC Chair Justin Milne announced that Guthrie had been sacked from the role of managing director of the ABC after the board of directors had concluded it was not in the best interests of the organisation for her to continue. After her dismissal, Guthrie took legal action against the ABC for unfair dismissal, represented by Johnson Winter Slattery. In March 2019, Guthrie and the ABC reached a settlement on the matter, with Guthrie receiving $730,000 to drop the legal action.

Guthrie is married to Darren Farr, a chef and restaurateur who runs The LoKal restaurant in Singapore. They have two daughters.

Media offices
Preceded by Mark Scott	Managing Director of the Australian Broadcasting Corporation; 2016–2018	Succeeded by David Anderson
