= List of fellows of the Australian Institute of Company Directors =

Fellows of the Australian Institute of Company Directors

This is a list of notable fellows of the Australian Institute of Company Directors (AICD).

Fellow is one of six categories of membership. It has the post nominal FAICD.

== A ==
- Charles Abbott (born 1939)
- Martin Albrecht
- Elizabeth Alexander (born 1943)
- Kym Anderson (born 1950)
- Marilyn Anderson
- Larry Anthony (born 1961)
- Peter Arnison (born 1940)

Back to top

== B ==
- Brian J. Boyle
- Mal Bryce (1943–2018)
- Ross Butler (born 1943)

Back to top

== C ==
- Megan Clark

Back to top

== D ==
- Andrew Darbyshire, author
- Roger Dean (born 1948)
- Annabel Digance
- Steve Doszpot (1948–2017)

Back to top

== F ==
- Ahmed Fahour (born 1966)
- Ian Frazer (born 1953)
- Philip Freier (born 1954)

Back to top

== G ==
- Geoff Garrett
- Peter Gray (born 1946)
- Stephen Gumley (born 1956)

Back to top

== H ==
- Ian Harper
- Catherine Harris
- Allan Hawke (born 1948)
- Iain Hay author and academic (born 1960)
- Milton Hearn (born 1943)
- Katrina Hodgkinson (born 1966)

Back to top

== I ==
- Graeme Innes (born 1955)
- Annie Ivanova, author

Back to top

== K ==
- Stephen Koroknay (born 1946)

Back to top

== L ==
- Andrew Lindberg (born 1954)
- Boon Yeow Lim (born 1960)
- Paul Little (born 1947)
- Jim Longley (born 1958)
- Jeffrey Lucy (born 1946)

Back to top

== M ==
- Alan Manly (born 1950), author
- Ron Manners (born 1936)
- John Marlay
- Nigel McBride
- Simon McKeon (born 1955)
- Sam McMahon (born 1967)
- Justin Milne (born 1952)
- Jim Molan (born 1950)
- Tony Mooney
- Rupert Myer (born 1958)

Back to top

== N ==
- Gary Neat (born 1948), journalist

Back to top

== O ==
- Jonathan O'Dea (born 1966)
- Greg O'Neill (born 1962)

Back to top

== P ==
- James Pearson
- Jim Petrich
- Susan Pond
- John B. Prescott (born 1940)

Back to top

== Q ==
- John Quiggin (born 1956)

Back to top

== R ==
- John Rosenberg

Back to top

== S ==
- Silvio Salom (born 1959)
- George Savvides (born 1956)
- Steven Schwartz (born 1946)
- Helen Scott-Orr
- David Shackleton (born 1948)
- Ann Caroline Sherry (born 1954)
- Peter Smedley
- Erica Smyth (born 1952)
- Georgie Somerset (born 1967)
- Robert Stable
- Andrew Stewart Coats (born 1958)
- Ziggy Switkowski (born 1948)

Back to top

== T ==
- Jan Thomas
- Matt Tripovich (born 1956)

Back to top

== V ==
- Cesar L. Villanueva

Back to top

== W ==
- Sam Walsh (born 1949)
- Anthony S. Weiss
- Ian Herbert White (born 1949)
- Brenda Wilson

Back to top

== Z ==
- Christian Zahra (born 1973)
- Alex Zelinsky (born 1960)

Back to top
