= Koroknay =

Koroknay is a surname of Hungarian origin. Notable people with the surname include:

- Stephen Koroknay (c. 1946–2013), Hungarian-Australian oil company executive
- Alex Koroknay-Palicz, American rights activist
- Géza Koroknay (1948–2013), Hungarian actor
