= David Knox (businessman) =

Australian oil and gas industry executive

David John Wissler Knox is an Australian oil and gas industry executive and former chief executive officer and managing director of Santos. Knox is originally from Edinburgh, Scotland and is considered to be one of South Australia's most influential people.

== Career ==
Knox was appointed to Santos' CEO and MD positions in July 2008 after joining the company the previous year. Knox was previously managing director for BP Developments in Australasia from 2003 to 2007. He has worked for BP in the United Kingdom and Pakistan, and has held management and engineering positions at ARCO and Shell in the USA, Netherlands, the United Kingdom and Norway. In August 2015 Knox announced that he would be leaving his leadership positions at Santos as soon as a successor had been appointed. As of 2016, Knox is the Chairman of the Australian Petroleum Production and Exploration Association (APPEA). and Deputy Chair of the CSIRO.

=== Coal seam gas ===
On his appointment to MD in 2008 Knox announced that coal seam gas production would become a key focus. This followed on from the work of his predecessor, John Ellice-Flint. As of September 2014, the Gladstone LNG project is approaching completion as the company's future gas gateway to export markets. Knox has remained optimistic about the project reaching completion in time to deliver first shipments in 2015.

Knox has defended coal seam gas in response to protesters involved with the Lock the Gate Alliance and the Wilderness Society who have raised concerns about soil and water contamination from fracking. He believes that coal seam gas provides a way forward to a low-carbon economy due to it burning at least 50% cleaner than coal. He has described coal seam gas opposition as misinformed, lacking in understanding and in some cases "deliberately pushed by people who will never support the resources industry."

== Remuneration ==
In 2008, Knox's salary at Santos was $1.75 million, with potential to double the figure if certain performance targets were met. His salary became a controversial topic in 2012, after it was revealed that he was to earn $2.25 million in base salary, plus bonuses for achieving targets under short-term and long-term incentive plans up to a total of $6.75 million. His earnings were four times that of any other Santos executive. A consultant's report commissioned by the company claimed that Mr Knox was not paid as well as his peers in other companies, despite the managing director of Woodside Petroleum, a company more than twice the size of Santos, being paid the same as Knox in 2011. His total financial compensation for the year 2013 was $6,263,668. In the fiscal year 2014, his total calculated compensation was $6,782,702. In 2016, following his departure from Santos, The Adelaide Advertiser reported that Knox had received more than AUD$30 million during his employment with the company.

== Memberships ==
Knox holds a number of positions on a variety of boards and councils. These include:

- Chair of the Snowy Hydro Limited
- Deputy Chair of the CSIRO
- Director of the Migration Council Australia
- Chairman of the Adelaide Botanic Gardens Foundation
- Director of the board of the Botanic Gardens and State Herbarium in South Australia
- Council member of the Business Council of Australia and the Royal Institution of Australia
- Member of Trade and Investment Policy Advisory Council
- Fellow of the Australian Institute of Mechanical Engineering
- Elected in November 2012 as a Fellow of the Australian Academy of Technological Sciences and Engineering

=== Former memberships ===
- Chair of the Australian Petroleum Production & Exploration Association (APPEA)

== Personal life ==
Knox, his wife, and their four children migrated to Australia in 2003. He, his wife, and one of their children became Australian citizens in 2010.
