= Coffee industry of Timor-Leste =

Coffee is the largest non-oil export of Timor-Leste (East Timor). Since the introduction of coffee by the Portuguese in the 1800s, the industry contributes a sizeable portion of the country's employment and investment and is a major source of income for rural communities. The industry is vulnerable to global coffee price fluctuation, deficient infrastructure, and lack of capital.

== Background ==
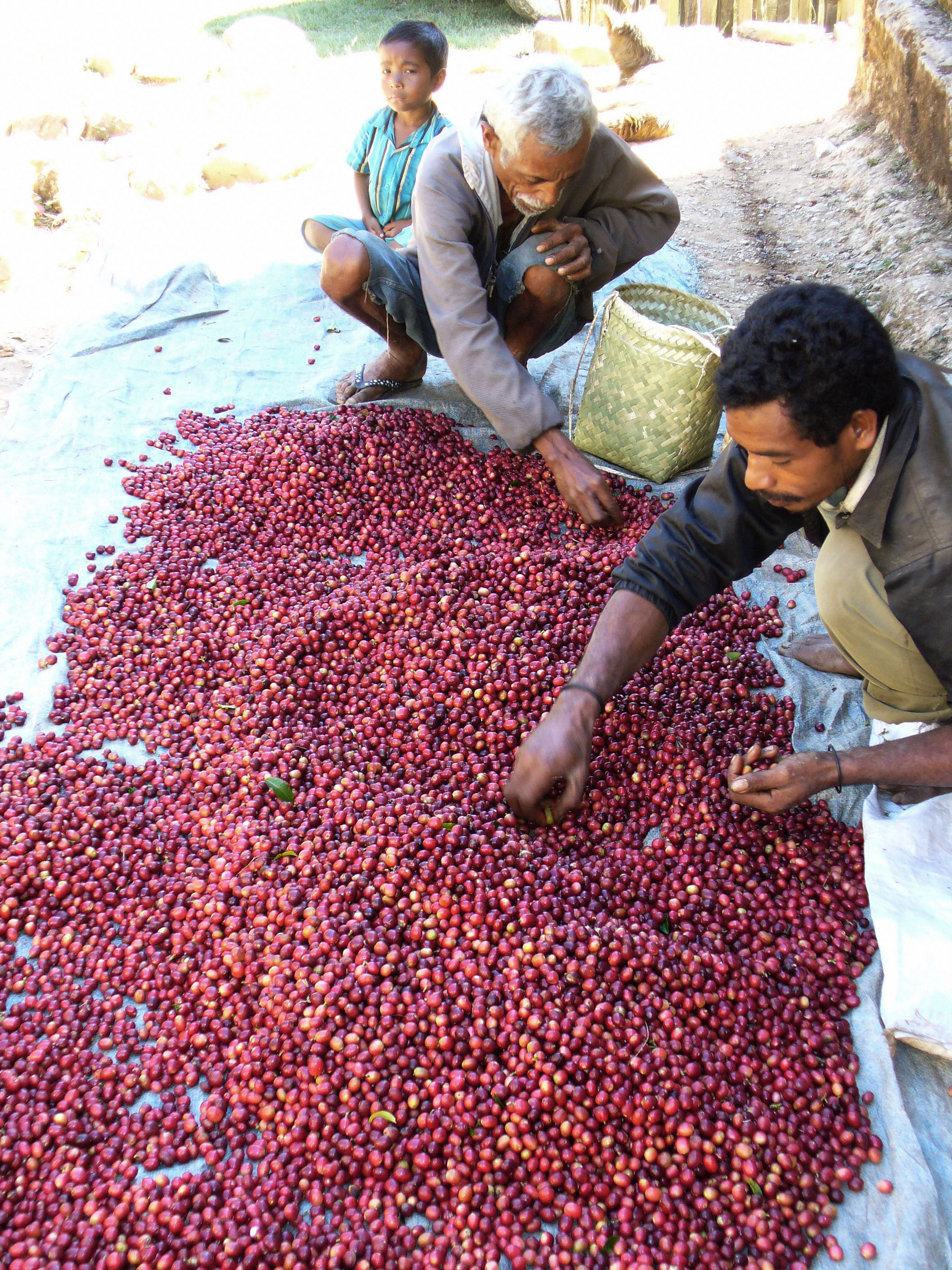
Timorese coffee workers taking part in production process

Considered one of the primary industries of Timor-Leste (East Timor), coffee is its chief export commodity. From the early sixteenth century to the eighteenth century, many different groups have competed for political control of East Timor, including indigenous groups, the Dutch and the Portuguese. 1749 saw the division of Western Timor and Eastern Timor, where the Dutch occupied the West and the Portuguese occupied the East until the cessation of the colonial era. Accounting for $26.4M of Timor-Leste's total exports in 2017, or 24% of its $108M total exports, the Portuguese's introduction of coffee production and cultivation to Timor-Leste in the early nineteenth century has progressed the nation's growth and development.

== Coffee producers in Timor-Leste ==
To most who reside in Timor-Leste, coffee production remains a source of supplementary income, with estimates from 2003 noting that around 200,000 people rely on coffee production and cultivation as their primary source of income. Timor-Leste's coffee production is done in a multitude of different areas, including the districts of Manufahi, Ainaro, and Liquica, who all produce a large amount, along with the districts of Aileu and Bobonaro. However, production of Timor-Leste's coffee is particularly concentrated in the district of Ermera, where, according to World Bank, almost ½ of the nation's coffee is produced.

The coffee industry of Timor-Leste is such that “coffee production in East Timor is based on relatively unmanaged plantations, with bean- gathering and processing by villagers, and scant attention paid to cleaning/weeding, pruning, pest and disease management or planting of new trees,” according to the Timor-Leste Ministry of Agriculture and Fisheries.

Coffee production in Timor-Leste is considered to be a process where there is a limited effort to tend to coffee bushes, whereby an emphasis is placed on land clearing around bushes to make way for future harvest. Through kin and hired help, producers supplement their work during the harvest time to maximize the efficiency of production. Of the coffee-producing families, the average size has 6 members, where it is approximated that their earnings are between $127 and $200 per year . Often extra labour is used, most of which includes extended family or a seasonal workforce, whereby their payment is usually barter or equivalent services. Many producers harvesting coffee in Timor-Leste state they don't own the lands, rather they use “lands abandoned by former estates”. Whilst by the definition of Timorese law means this defaults to the state, it is often turned a blind eye to because of the economic contribution of production.

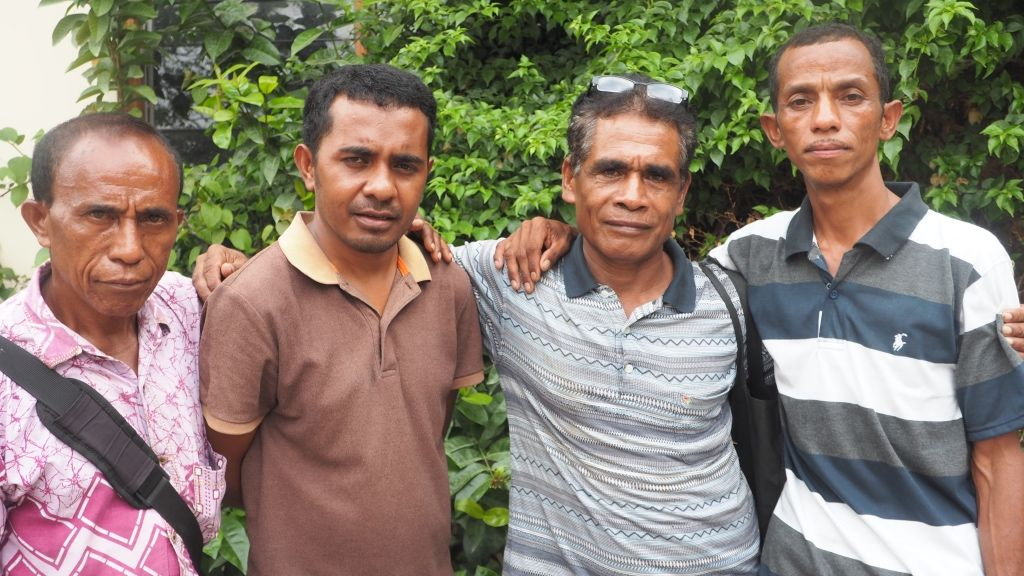
Coffee producer grant beneficiaries

Loans and grants from international agencies such as the Asian Development Bank (ADB) and World Bank have also assisted in expanding production within the region. In December 2016, the ADB approved a $225,000 grant to help reduce poverty in Timor-Leste by funding long-term improvements in the volume and quality of coffee produced by smallholder farmers. “Coffee is grown by almost one-third of all Timorese households and has been the country’s largest non-oil export for the past 150 years,” said David Freedman, Country Economist from ADB's Timor-Leste Resident Mission. Moreover, these grants by global agencies enable coffee producers to reinvest in critical production infrastructure and create an industry of self-sufficiency, seasonal employment, stable income, and long-term economic growth.

== Quality of coffee ==
Timor-Leste's coffee production accounts for under 0.2% of the global coffee trade; however, it remains in a unique and opportunistic position given its standing as the largest single-source organic coffee producer globally. The National Co-operative Business Association describes the emerging coffee as “one of the finest and most unique coffees in the world” . This is largely a result of the fertile volcanic soils known as the ‘Hibrido de Timor’, where the coffee is grown. Additionally, Alf Kramer, a leading coffee expert has described Timor's coffee as “among the top 1% in quality and price worldwide”.

Very little of the world’s coffee is grown wild at higher attitudes of a tropical island, making the coffee method uncommon.

The Híbrido de Timor, a hybrid coffee cultivar, is the result of a natural cross between Coffea arabica (Arabica coffee) and C. canephora (Robusta coffee). This cultivar inherits traits from both parent species, including the ability to grow in less fertile soils. However, the hybrid exhibits some reduction in cup quality compared with the more highly regarded parent species. It combines these characteristics with the ability to withstand the harsher growing conditions of Timor while retaining certain coffee quality characteristics.

Timorese coffee producers maintain their usage of processing coffee from cherry on the bush to parchment. According to DAI statistics in 2002, 75% of coffee was processed in Timor-Leste using this method, where only hours after being picked, the cherry begins to deteriorate, compared to properly stored parchment which remains a far slower deterioration process.

== Issues facing the sector ==
=== International coffee prices ===
The largest single source to numerous rural families remains coffee, and it also represents one of the strongest facets of employment in the nation. Moreover, global fluctuations in coffee prices have created problems for coffee producers in Timor-Leste. These problems, however, are to a lesser extent than nations which have made larger capital investment in coffee plantations and subsequent infrastructure. In the past, Timorese coffee producers have had little to no opportunity to capitalise upon higher coffee prices and as such are described as limited investment coffee producers. Additionally, if a global coffee crisis was to arise, forcing competing industries and farmers throughout the world to leave the sector, this would have the ability to put Timorese producers in a position to benefit from global price recovery. Furthermore, the East Timorese coffee sector lacks the appropriate capitalisation or income return to currently be an uprising figure in the global coffee trade.

=== Roads and infrastructure ===
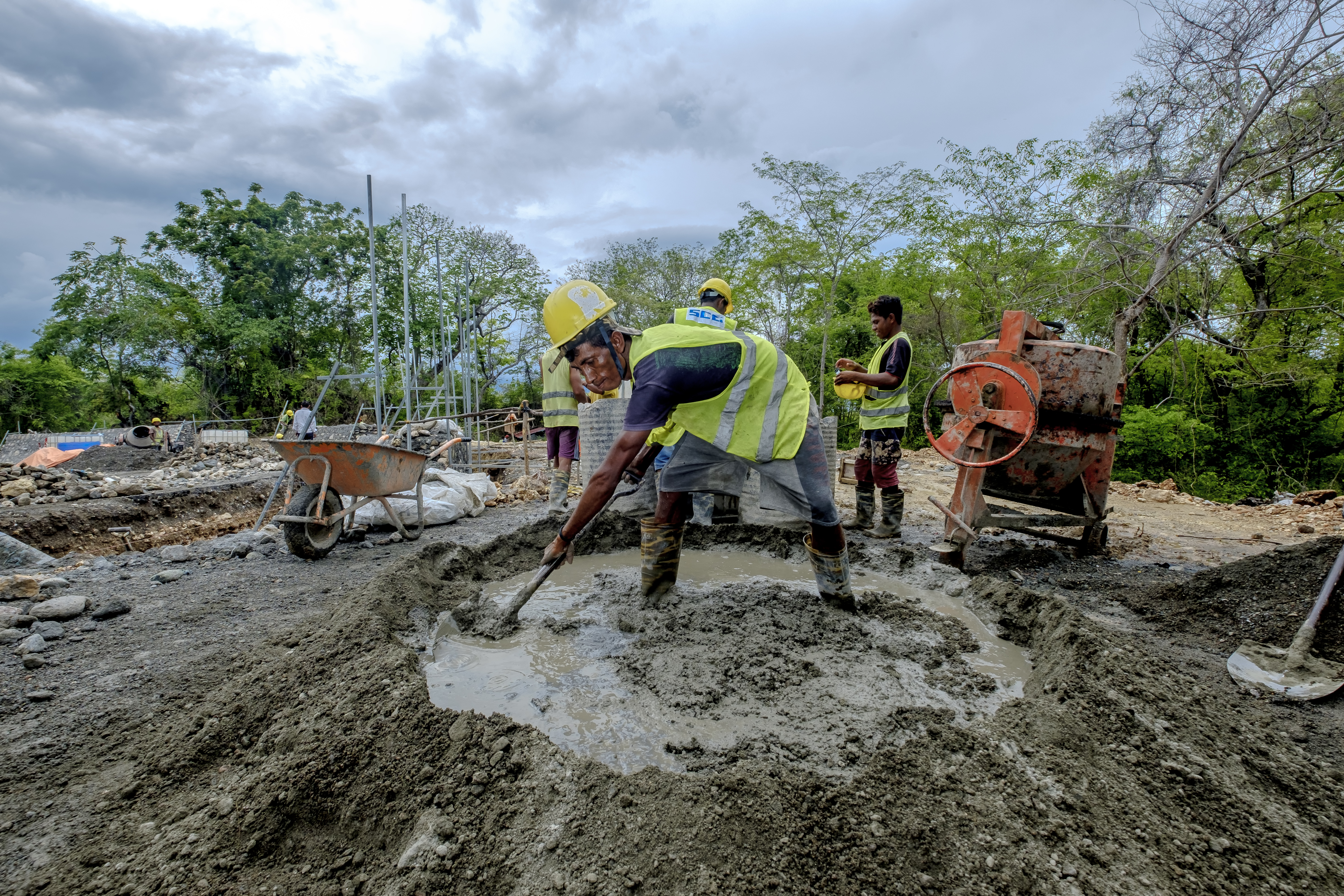
Work being completed on the Dili to Baucau Highway Project

During the Indonesian occupation of East Timor, roads and infrastructure were boosted, with the amount of paved road exponentially rising from ‘effectively zero to around 4,500km by the end of the Indonesian period’. Forbes Asia's Joe Springer comments on a ‘44-page study on Improving the Lot of the Farmer in Timor-Leste by Sweden's Research Institute of Industrial Economics in 2012 found that infrastructure, outdated mills, and other technical issues were holding back the coffee industry in Timor-Leste. ‘It cites other studies from the World Bank that with investment and updating, gross margins could increase nearly four-fold and returns per labour day could increase in excess of 50%.’ With the nation currently benefiting from the strategically important Bayu-Undan oil and gas field and World Bank, Asian Development Bank investment, infrastructure is rapidly improving. New roadways will promote rural development and grant greater access to coffee producers to expand production, and further the sector into larger global markets.

=== The market for Timor-Leste coffee ===
Because of Timor-Leste's more niche coffee market, which brands itself as a more premium, organic product, backed by Fairtrade, it is noted that Timor's coffee industry will be protected by fluctuations in global markets. Whilst Timor-Leste's coffee industry is known as a more organic and premium product, there has been little to no market research or marketing strategy for its infiltration into the global market. What remains a major concern for the viability of further market capitalisation by the Timorese-based industry is that whilst the quality of the coffee is on the rise, it does not yet reach the best of international standards.

A big factor in limiting market opportunities for East Timorese coffee remains the cost of production. Relative to other international producers, the cost of producing coffee is spurred on by the use of the US dollar as the national currency and a poor state of road infrastructure. However, projects such as the Dili to Baucau Highway project in alliance with ADB, and various other projects aim to improve the state of infrastructure. Another factor is the relatively high labour costs in Timor-Leste, as compared to nations such as Indonesia and other Southeast Asian countries. Through the use of US dollars, the government is unable to devaluate currency and make exports more competitive globally. In combination, these factors constrain Timor-Leste's coffee market's ability to make their product internationally competitive in relation to price.

With an already saturated international market for organic coffee, Timor-Leste's inability to create a more efficient coffee production scheme stunts the Timorese market's growth globally.

== Significance of the sector to Timor-Leste ==
With coffee comprising 24% of Timor-Leste's economy, and as much as 90% of the annual income for approximately 25% of Timor-Leste's population, the sector plays a major role in investment, employment, wage growth and overall economic prosperity. However, this income is highly variable depending on the international coffee market, but regardless due to the simple production methods required to produce coffee farmers are unlikely to abandon the sector. Moreover, with bigger companies such as Starbucks investing in plantations in Co-op programs, more and more of the coffee-producing population are set to benefit. Andrew Linneman, Starbucks' Vice-President of Global Coffee Quality and Engagement told Forbes ‘there are about 22,000 farmers in the co-operative that supplies Starbucks from Timor-Leste.
