= Chamber of Commerce and Industry of Western Australia =

Employers organization in Western Australia

The Chamber of Commerce and Industry of Western Australia (CCIWA), founded in 1890, also known as the Western Australian Chamber of Commerce & Industry, is a peak employers and business association in Western Australia.

== History ==
CCIWA is not connected to the first Western Australian Chamber of Commerce, which was founded in Fremantle in 1853 and later renamed the Fremantle Chamber of Commerce.

The Perth Chamber of Commerce founded in 1890 is the basis of the present CCIWA. A separate confederation of regional business associations, known as the Federated Chambers of Commerce of Western Australia, was formed in 1929. Two other organisations, the Chamber of Manufactures of WA and the Western Australian Employers Federation (both founded in 1913) merged in 1975 to create the Confederation of WA Industry.

In 1983, the Perth Chamber of Commerce merged with the Federated Chambers of Commerce, to form the Chamber of Commerce & Industry of WA. In 1992, the Confederation of WA Industry became part of CCIWA.

CCIWA is also separate from another significant business association in WA: the Chamber of Minerals and Energy of Western Australia (CME), founded in 1895 as the Coolgardie Chamber of Mines and Commerce.

== Former CEOs ==
- Deidre Willmott (2014 - 2018)
- Lyndon Rowe (1990 - 2004)
- James Pearson (2008 - 2013)

== See also ==
- Australian Chamber of Commerce and Industry
