= Georgie Somerset =

Australian farmer, grazier and community advocate

Georgie Somerset AM FAICD

Personal details
- Born: Georgina Jane Persse Robinson; 10 September 1967 (age 58)

Georgina Jane Persse Somerset (née Robinson; born 10 September 1967) is an Australian farmer and grazier, and a community advocate for the rural industry, particularly women in the industry.

Somerset was appointed General President of farming lobby group AgForce Queensland in 2018.

From 2009 to 2014, she was president of the Queensland Rural, Regional and Remote Women's Network and was founding vice-president of the organisation in 1993.

She serves as a non-executive director on the boards of the Queensland Children's Hospital (since 2013), the Queensland section of the Royal Flying Doctor Service (since 2016), and the Australian Broadcasting Corporation (since 2017).

In 1997, Somerset was nominated for ABC Rural Woman of the Year. In 2014, she was named one of 100 Women of Influence in the Local/Regional category by The Australian Financial Review, for her role as an ambassador for Women in Australian Agribusiness.

In January 2020, Somerset made a Member of the Order of Australia (AM) in the Australia Day Honours for significant service to primary industry, to women, and to the community.
