= James Pearson (business advocate) =

Australian business advocate

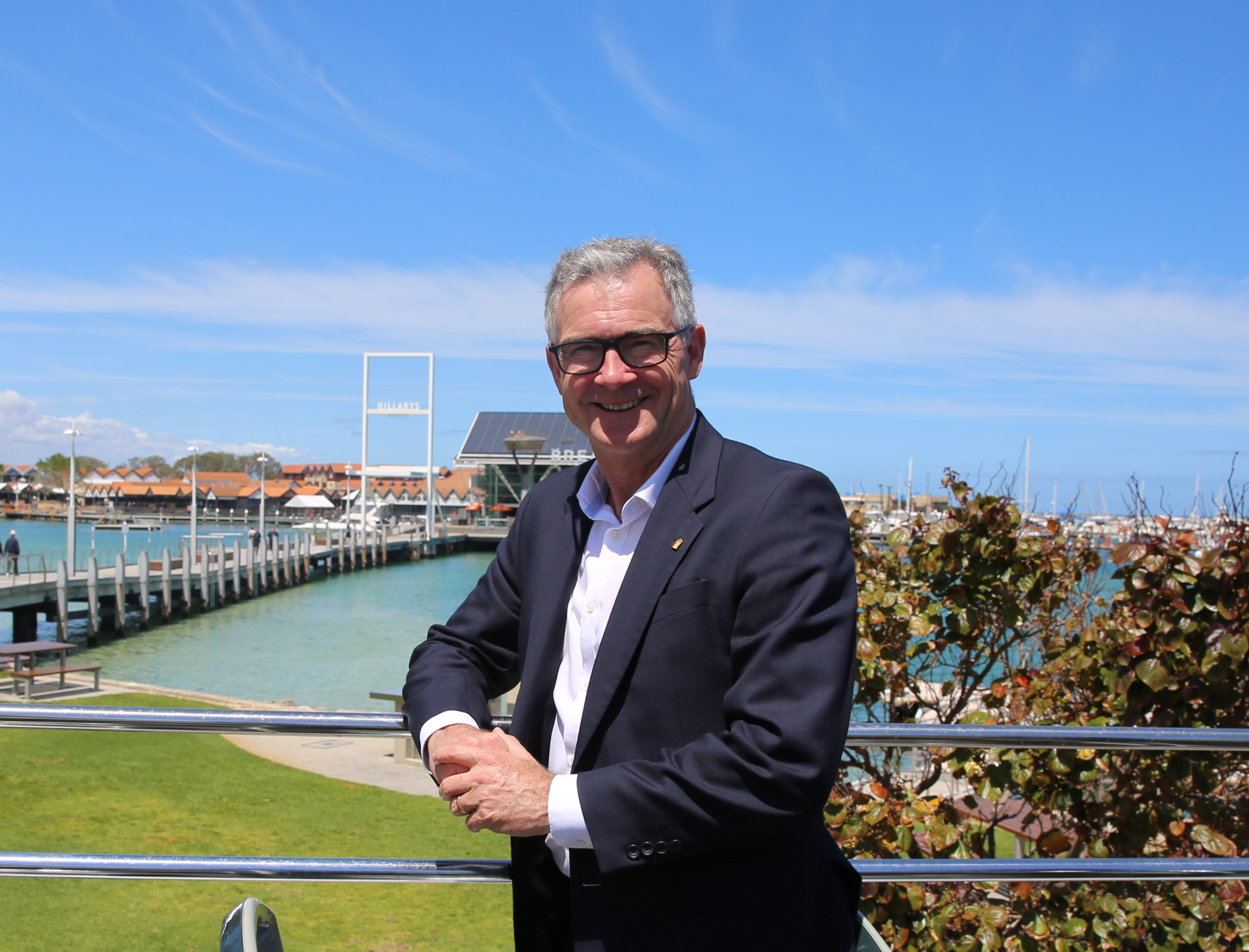
James Pearson

James Hugo Pearson is a former diplomat and business advocate who is the chief executive officer of the City of Joondalup in Western Australia, the centre of the north west metropolitan region of Perth and one of Western Australia's largest local government areas. He is the former chief executive officer of the Australian Chamber of Commerce and Industry, Australia’s largest business advocacy network.

== Career ==
Pearson started his career with the Australian Department of Foreign Affairs and Trade in 1984. He served as Political & Economic Officer at the Australian High Commission in Vanuatu and as First Secretary, Economic & Trade, at the Australian Embassy in China.

Pearson joined the Western Australian Department of State Development as a Policy Director in 1997, where he led government initiatives to support development of the resources and energy industry.

From 2000 he represented the oil and gas industry in Western Australia and the Northern Territory as a director of the Australian Petroleum Production and Exploration Association before joining Chevron in 2002 as External Affairs Manager. In the role he led lobbying, reputation management, workforce communications and corporate social responsibility in Australia, Papua New Guinea and the Philippines.

Pearson become CEO of the Chamber of Commerce and Industry of Western Australia in 2008, where he led the peak group representing employers in Western Australia through the 2008 financial crisis and local gas supply crisis, followed by unprecedented population growth and a rapid increase in private sector investment.

In 2013 Pearson joined Shell as general manager, external & government relations, where he was responsible for protecting and building Shell's reputation in Australia through significant business change, including merger with global BG group, divestment of refining and retail, and construction of Prelude FLNG and Gorgon gas projects.

In 2016 Pearson commenced his role as CEO of the Australian Chamber of Commerce and Industry, Australia’s largest business advocacy network. He has led the Australian Chamber’s Top 10 in 10 competitiveness advocacy campaign and overseen a period of significant membership growth.

As CEO of the Australian Chamber, Pearson spoke publicly on issues including company tax, apprenticeships, public finances, wages and cyber security.

He has been published in outlets including The Australian, the Australian Financial Review, the Sydney Morning Herald, The West Australian, The Courier-Mail, the Herald Sun, the Adelaide Advertiser, the Huffington Post and Crikey.

Pearson was appointed as CEO at the City of Joondalup, a planned commercial and residential centre with an economy driven largely by the services and knowledge sectors, in March 2021.

== Education and affiliations ==
Pearson is an adjunct professor at Deakin University, has a Bachelor of Science (Honours) from the University of Western Australia, a Master of Business Administration from Deakin University and is a Life Member and Fellow of the Australian Institute of Management and a Fellow of the Australian Institute of Company Directors.

== Personal ==
Born in the United Kingdom and a naturalised Australian citizen since 1980, Pearson grew up in Perth, Western Australia where he was a scholarship student at Scotch College, Swanbourne. Pearson is married with three adult children. He is a keen sailor and supports the Fremantle Dockers in the AFL.
