= Martin Albrecht (businessman) =

Australian businessman

Martin Albrecht AC FTSE FAICD FAIM FIEAust

Chief Executive Officer, Thiess Pty Ltd
- In office 1985–2000

Personal details
- Born: Martin Carl Albrecht

Martin Carl Albrecht is an Australian businessman, best known for his service as chairman, previously CEO (1985–2000), of Thiess. In June 2002 he was appointed a Companion of the Order of Australia "For service to the construction industry, to the development of export markets, to the engineering profession, and to the community in the areas of education, corporate social responsibility and industrial safety."

== Education and qualifications ==
- B.Tech (Civil Engineering)
- Immanuel College, Adelaide
- Alice Springs High School
- Fellow of the Australian Academy of Technological Sciences and Engineering
- Hon. Fellow of the Institution of Engineers Australia
- Fellow of the Australian Institute of Company Directors

== Directorships and Board positions ==
- Chairman, National Trunk Rail (NTR)
- Chairman, Exergen
- Director, Regional River Festival - Bremer to Bay
- Patron, Wesley Medical Research
- Patron, Brisbane Regional Youth Orchestra
- 1985-2000 CEO, Thiess
- 2001-2008 Chairman, Thiess
- 1999-2003 Nonexecutive Director, Cliffs Asia Pacific Iron Ore Holdings
- 2001-2010 (Founding) Chairman Emeritus, Geodynamics
- 2001-2008 Nonexecutive Director, Leighton Holdings
- 2003-2010 Founding Chairman, International RiverFoundation
- 2004-2013 Chairman, Wesley Research Institute
- Former Director, International RiverFoundation
- Former Trustee, The Queensland Museum Foundation
- Former, Board of Governors, Committee for Economic Development of Australia
- Former Member, Federal Government Construction Industry Development Authority
- Former Director, Portman Limited
- Former Director, Siemens Australia Advisory Board
- Former Director, QGC
- Former Director, Australian Prospectors & Miners' Hall of Fame
- Former Director, 2001 Goodwill Games Board
- Former Chairman, Lifestream Foundation
- Former Chairman, Queensland Government Landmark Building Taskforce
- Former Member, Queensland Premier's Business Round Table
- Former Member, Queensland Government Vocational Education Training Commission

== Honours and awards ==
- 2002 Companion of the Order of Australia
- 2001 Centenary Medal
- 2000 Service "Cross of the Order of Merit - First Class" - Federal Republic of Germany
- 2001 Australian Constructors Association, Services to Construction Award
- 2003 QUT Distinguished Constructors Award
- Honorary Doctorate, University of Queensland
- Honorary Doctorate, Queensland University of Technology
- Honorary Doctorate, Griffith University
- Honorary Doctorate, University of SA
- Honorary Fellow, Engineers Australia
- 2006 Inducted Hall of Fame - Engineers Australia (Qld) Division - Gold Medal
- 2008 EPA Queensland - Inaugural Premier's Award for Leadership in Business Sustainability
- 2008 Australian Institute of Company Directors (Qld) - Gold Medal
