= Jeffrey Lucy =

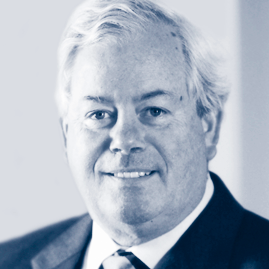
Portrait of Jeffrey Lucy

Jeffrey John Lucy AM (born 6 November 1946) is the former chairman of the Australian Securities and Investments Commission (ASIC), Australia's Capital Markets and Corporations Regulator. He is the first non-lawyer chairman of ASIC. He was succeeded by Tony D'Aloisio in early 2007.

Lucy has had extensive experience in the Australian business community, particularly in the Accounting Profession. He has a background as a Chartered Accountant and is also a former chairman of the Financial Reporting Council (FRC), a former president of the Institute of Chartered Accountants in Australia (ICAA), a member of the Business Regulation Advisory Group, a member of the CPA Australia/ICAA Joint Standing Committee (JSC) and also the managing partner of the Adelaide office of now Big Four Accounting firm PricewaterhouseCoopers.

His awards and accreditations include:

- AM - Member of the Order of Australia for services to the accounting profession, business sector and community, 2001
- FCA - Fellow, Institute of Chartered Accountants in Australia (ICAA)
- FCPA - Fellow, CPA Australia (Certified Practicing Accountants Australia)
- FNIA - Fellow, National Institute of Accountants (NIA)
- FAICD - Fellow, Australian Institute of Company Directors (AICD)
