= Australian School of Petroleum and Energy Resources =

- Former name: Australian School of Petroleum
- Type: Engineering and geoscience school
- Established: 2003
- Parent institution: University of Adelaide
- Location: Adelaide, South Australia, Australia
- Campus: Urban

The Australian School of Petroleum and Energy Resources (ASPER) is a centre for education, training and research in petroleum and energy resources engineering, geoscience and management at the University of Adelaide in South Australia (now Adelaide University). ASPER is housed in the purpose-built Santos Petroleum Engineering Building on the university's North Terrace campus.

== History ==
The Australian School of Petroleum originated from the merger, in 2003, of the National Centre for Petroleum Geology and Geophysics (NCPGG) and the School of Petroleum Engineering and Management (SPEM). In 2020, the School was renamed from the Australian School of Petroleum to the Australian School of Petroleum and Energy Resources to reflect its teaching and research in areas such as the underground storage and use of carbon and hydrogen. The NCPGG was founded as a government and industry-funded Centre of Excellence in 1986. The SPEM was founded in 2000 under an AU $25 million Sponsorship Agreement between the University of Adelaide and Santos Limited. At the time it was believed to be 'the largest single industry sponsorship ever given to a public university in Australia.'

== School Ranking and Reputation ==
In 2020 the QS World University Rankings included the discipline of Petroleum Engineering for the first time.

The ERA (Excellence in Research Australia) is the Australian Government’s attempt to assess research quality and impact. As a School focused largely on a single industry sector, its research outputs do not align with a single ERA field of research, with the majority of ASPER’s outputs allocated to the “Resource Engineering and Extractive Metallurgy” and “Geology” fields of research. In the most recent ERA (2018), the University of Adelaide received 5/5 in both these categories.

== Engagement with Industry and Government ==
ASPER interacts with industry and government agencies and is sometimes sought out for advice on matters related to petroleum and energy management. ASPER’s industry Advisory Board has 13 members from 10 energy companies (Santos, Beach Energy, Chevron, BHP, Esso Australia, Woodside Energy, Vintage Energy, Strike Energy, Cooper Energy, and Schlumberger), CO2CRC and the South Australian government. The Board advises ASPER on the capabilities they seek in future employees, their training needs and the research needs of the industry. A large proportion of ASPER research is funded by the industry in the form of consortia, direct contract research or through collaborative Australian Research Council (ARC) Linkage grants. The South Australian State Government has provided support to ASPER and its predecessors, including funding for the South Australian State Chair of Petroleum Geoscience which has been held by Cedric Griffiths (1994-1999), Bruce Ainsworth (2010-2013) and Peter McCabe (2014-2020).

The number of research papers co-authored by ASPER staff and industry-based collaborators provides a possible measure for ASPER’s engagement with the industry. ASPER has performed an analysis that determined 29.8% of its publications during the last 3 years have been published with industry co-authors, higher than both the 3.6% of papers published by University of Adelaide academics and the Australia-wide average of 2.3%.

== Teaching ==
ASPER offers a range of undergraduate and postgraduate coursework and research programs in engineering and geoscience, from which approximately 2100 students have graduated since 2002.
