= Australian Chamber of Commerce and Industry =

Australian business organisation

- Founded: 1992
- Headquarters: Canberra, Australia
- CEO: Andrew McKellar
- Website: www.acci.com.au

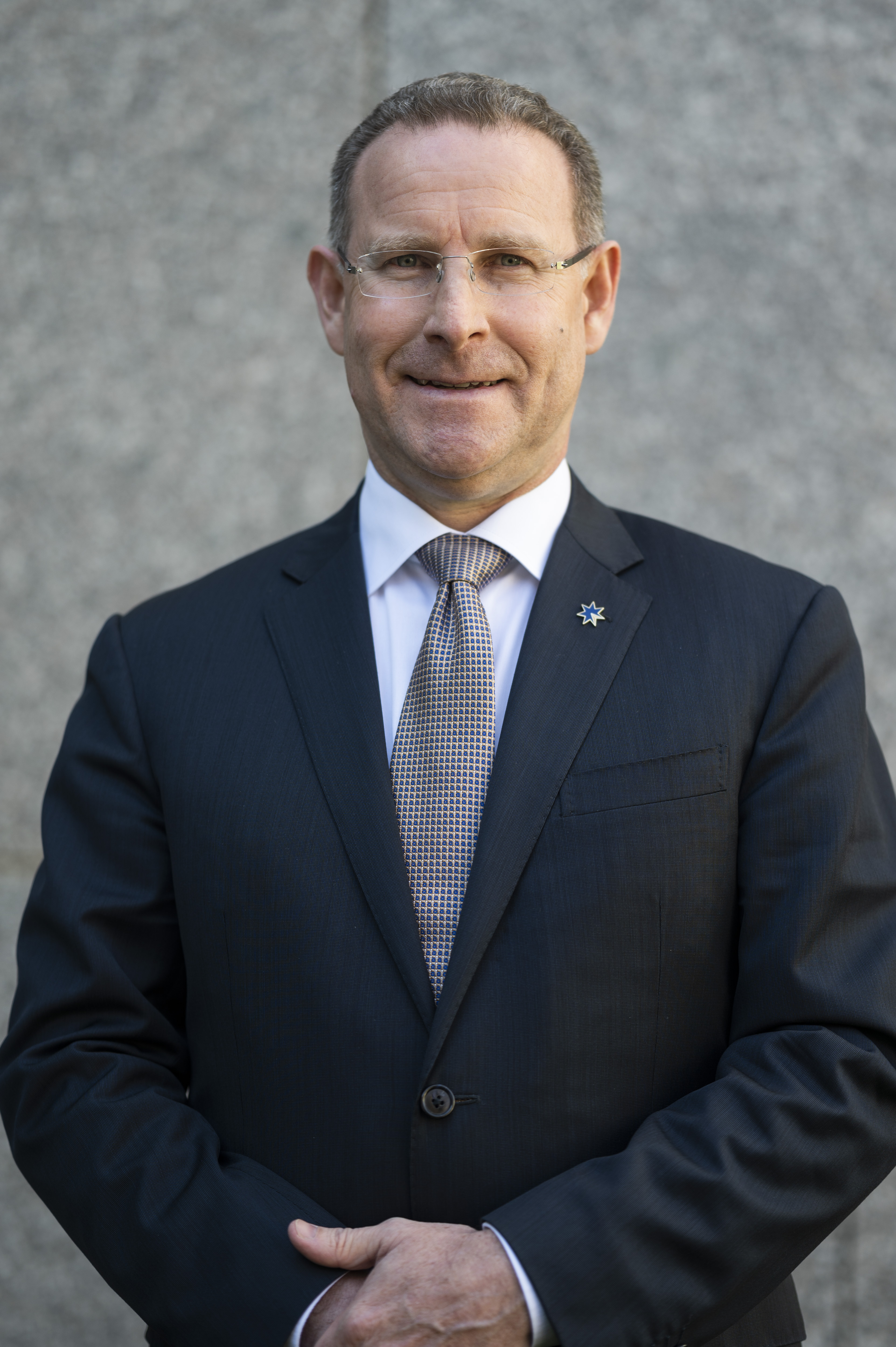
Andrew McKellar, CEO of ACCI

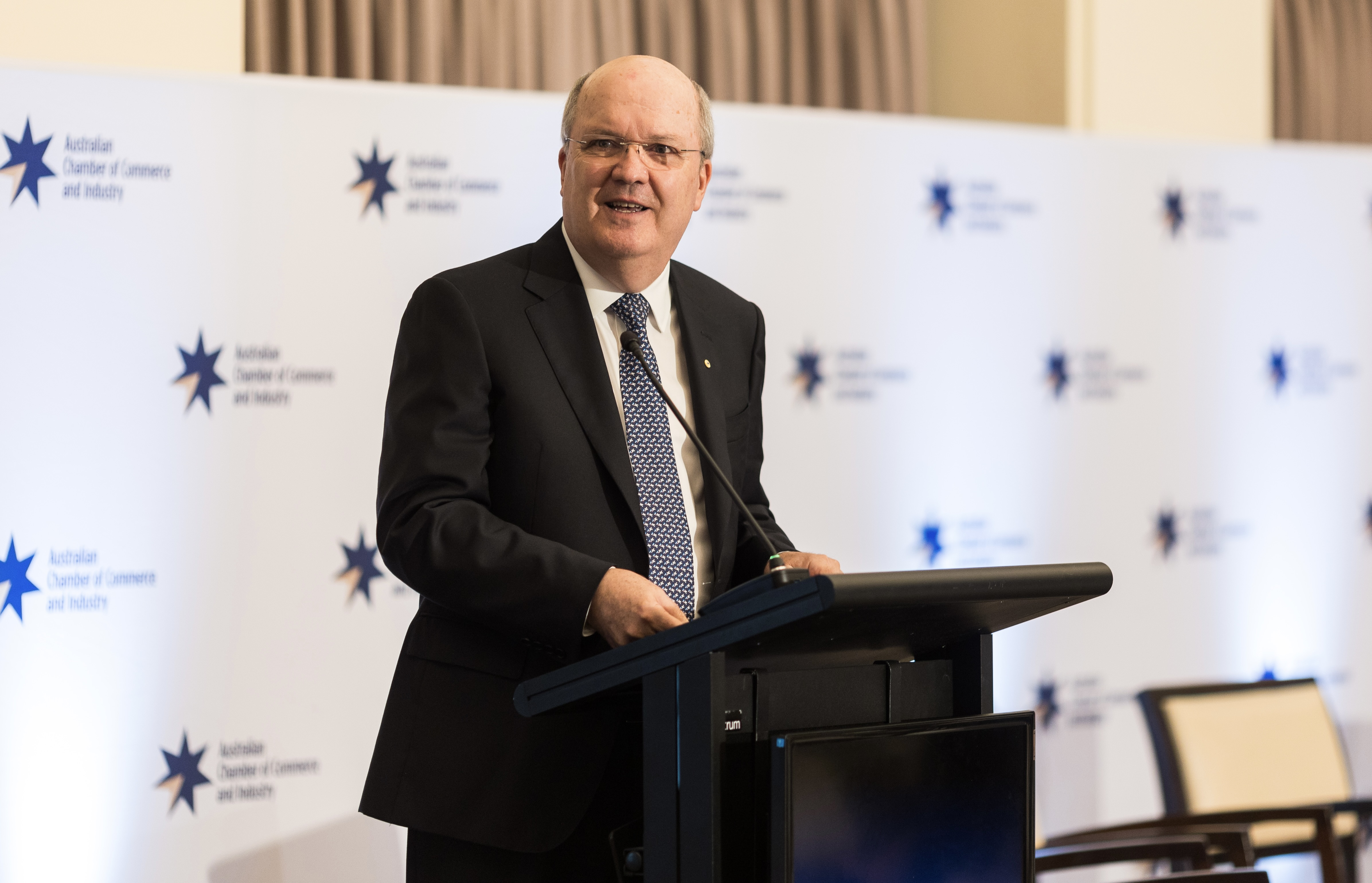
Mark Birrell, president of ACCI

The Australian Chamber of Commerce and Industry (ACCI) is Australia's largest business association, comprising state and territory chambers of commerce and national industry associations. It was formed from a merger of the Confederation of Australian Industry (CAI) and the Australian Chamber of Commerce (ACC) in 1992.

ACCI contributes to public discussion and government decision-making on issues that impact on business, including economics, trade, workplace relations, work health and safety and employment, education and training. The Chamber also speaks on behalf of Australian business in international forums.

The current (2026) chief executive of ACCI is Andrew McKellar and the president is Nola Watson. The organisation is headquartered in Canberra, with offices in Sydney and Melbourne.

== History ==
The Chamber Movement commenced in Australia when the Sydney Chamber of Commerce was established in 1826. Across the 19th century, Chambers of Commerce were formed in Adelaide (1839), Melbourne, Hobart and Launceston (each in the 1850s), Brisbane (1868), Fremantle (1873) and Perth (1890).

Chambers of Manufacturers were also formed in this era, including in Victoria (1865), South Australia (1869), NSW (1885), Western Australia (1890) and Queensland (1911). Australia's first industry association was Master Builders Australia (1870).

Employer unions and federations also emerged, including the Victorian Employers Union (1865), the NSW Employers Union (1888), South Australian Employers Federation (1889) and the Queensland Employers Federation (1886). Business actors were important for Australia's development from the beginning, with a growing population driving the establishment of enterprises.

In the decade before Federation in 1901, several Australia-wide bodies were formed to advocate national policies: the Australian Chamber of Commerce (ACC), the Associated Chambers of Manufacturers of Australia (ACMA) and the Australian Council of Employers Federations (ACEF).

In 1977 the ACMA and the ACEF merged to form the Confederation of Australian Industry (CAI). In 1992 the CAI merged with the ACC to form the Australian Chamber of Commerce and Industry (ACCI).

In 2015 the organisation launched a new corporate identity, featuring the Federation Star to demonstrate "the way they bring together businesses from all parts of the country" according to their website

== Structure ==
The Australian Chamber is a non-profit organisation whose members are chambers of commerce of Australia's states and territories and national industry associations.

The Australian Chamber is governed by a constitution and is led by a Board. Board members are elected from the membership at the Annual General Meeting held each November.

The General Council, comprising the Board and other member representatives, oversees the Australian Chamber's policy development. The General Council meets three times a year and is advised by policy committees and working parties that meet between General Council meetings.

== Policy ==
The Australian Chamber has formal policies on a range of matters:

Economics and Industry: The chamber argues to lower taxes, reduce the size of government, cut regulations, and improve productivity.

Employment, Education and Training: for a stronger emphasis in employability in education.

Small Business: The Australian Chamber says Australia's two million small businesses that employ seven million people are the backbone of the economy. It argues for a focus on cutting red tape, simplifying the tax system, improving access to finance, making it easier to employ people and building better infrastructure.

Sustainability: The Australian Chamber supports sustainable development that maintains the capacity of society, the economy and the environment to satisfy the needs of current and future generations. It argues for a focus on improving transport infrastructure and services to ensure Australia's growing cities are efficient, productive and liveable.

Trade and International Affairs: The Australian Chamber supports global free trade as a principal driver of economic prosperity and peace, with greater cooperation facilitated through multilateral, plurilateral and bilateral trade liberalisation. It argues for a focus on ensuring better, easier and more seamless access to new markets, investment opportunities and innovations for Australian businesses.

Workplace Relations: The Australian Chambers supports a world-class workplace relations system that promotes individual flexibility, greater job opportunities and more productive and effective workplaces. It argues for a focus on ensuring modern workplace laws reflect and address 21st century business and community needs without undue third-party interference or lost competitiveness.

Work Health and Safety: The Australian Chamber says its member network is committed to ensuring that every person, every day, returns home safely from work; work where everyone is continually looking for better ways of doing things and improving work health and safety culture, and performance, including in psychological health. It says business supports nationally consistent WHS legislation and supports non-regulatory approaches where all parties, employers, employees and others have mutual and collective responsibilities for health and safety.

== Advocacy ==
In 2016 the Australian Chamber released its "Top 10 in 10: Ten steps towards a more competitive Australia" policy manifesto. The 10 steps are:

1. Give young people a chance to succeed by making it easier for employers to take on apprentices and trainees
2. Ensure government spending is sustainable by reducing it to less than 25% of GDP
3. Help industries grow through workplace regulation that better responds to their needs
4. Let entrepreneurs get on with growing their businesses by reducing government red tape each year
5. Create jobs by allowing employers and employees to negotiate workplace arrangements that best meet their needs
6. Boost incomes by cutting the company tax rate to 25% within ten years through annual reductions
7. Build the transport, communications and energy facilities we need by backing the independent plan of Infrastructure Australia
8. Lower building costs by bringing back the Australian Building and Construction Commission
9. Encourage innovation and value for money by facilitating greater competition in government-funded education, health and aged care services
10. Welcome more international visitors by making visas cheaper and easier to obtain

The Australian Chamber advocates on behalf of employers at the Fair Work Commission and other industrial bodies in matters including the Annual Wage Review.

== Leadership ==
=== Chief executive officers ===
- Ian Spicer AM, 1992–1996
- Mark Paterson AO, 1996–2001
- Lyndon Rowe, (acting) 2001–2002
- Dr Peter Hendy, 2002–2008
- Peter Anderson, 2008–2014
- Kate Carnell AO, 2014–2016
- James Pearson, 2016–2021
- Andrew McKellar, 2021–present

=== Presidents ===
- John Clark AM, 1992–1993
- Harold Clough AO, OBE, 1993–1995
- Graeme Samuel AO, 1995–1997
- Robert Gerard AO, 1997–1999
- Dr John Keniry AM, 1999–2001
- David Gray AM, 2001–2003
- Neville Sawyer AM, 2003–2005
- Peter O'Brien, 2005–2007
- Tony Howarth AO, 2007–2009
- David Michaelis, 2009–2011
- Richard Holyman, 2011–2013
- Peter Hood, 2013–2015
- Terry Wetherall AM, 2015–2017
- Jeremy Johnson AM, 2017–2019
- Ray Sputore, 2019–2021
- Nola Watson, 2021–2023
- Mark Birrell AM, 2023–Present

== Members ==
Members of the Australian Chamber are state and territory chambers of business, and national industry associations. They include:

=== Chamber members ===
- Business SA
- Canberra Business Chamber
- Chamber of Commerce and Industry Queensland
- Chamber of Commerce and Industry of Western Australia
- Chamber of Commerce Northern Territory
- New South Wales Business Chamber
- Tasmanian Chamber of Commerce and Industry
- Victorian Chamber of Commerce and Industry

=== Industry association members ===
- Accord Australasia
- Air Conditioning and Mechanical Contractors' Association
- Aged and Community Services Australia
- Association of Independent Schools of NSW
- Association of Financial Advisers
- Australian Subscription Television and Radio Association
- Australian Automotive Dealer Association
- Australian Beverages Council Limited
- Australian Dental Association
- Australian Dental Industry Association
- Australian Federation of Employers and Industries
- Australian Federation of Travel Agents
- Australian Gift and Homewares Association
- Australian Hotels Association
- Australian International Airlines Operations Group
- Australian Made Campaign Limited
- Australian Mines and Metals Association
- Australian Paint Manufacturers' Federation Inc
- Australasian Pizza Association
- Australian Recording Industry Association Ltd
- Australian Retailers' Association
- Australian Self Medication Industry Inc
- Australian Steel Institute
- Australian Tourism Awards Inc
- The Australian Veterinary Association
- Boating Industry Association
- Business Council of Co-operatives and Mutuals
- Bus Industry Confederation
- Caravan Industry Association of Australia
- Cement Concrete Aggregates Australia
- Chiropractors' Association of Australia
- Cruise Lines International Association
- Consult Australia
- Customer Owned Banking Association
- Council of Private Higher Education Inc
- Direct Selling Association of Australia Inc
- Exhibition and Event Association of Australasia
- Fitness Australia
- Hire & Rental Industry Assoc Ltd
- Housing Industry Association
- Independent Tertiary Education Council Australia (ITECA)
- Large Format Retail Association
- Live Performance Australia
- Master Builders Australia Limited
- Master Plumbers & Mechanical Services Association of Australia
- Medicines Australia
- Medical Technology Association of Australia
- National Disability Services
- National Electrical and Communications Association
- National Employment Service Association
- National Fire Industry Association
- National Online Retail Association
- National Retail Association Limited
- The National Roads and Motorists Association
- Think Brick Australia
- NSW Taxi Council
- Outdoor Media Association
- Oil Industry Industrial Association
- Pharmacy Guild of Australia
- Phonographic Performance Company of Australia
- Plastics and Chemicals Industries Association
- Printing Industries Association of Australia
- Recruitment and Consulting Services Association of Australia and New Zealand
- Restaurant and Catering Australia
- Screen Producers Australia
- The Tax Institute
- Victorian Automobile Chamber of Commerce

== International network ==
The Australian Chamber speaks on behalf of Australian business in international forums, including:

- International Chamber of Commerce
- Business and Industry Advisory Committee to the Organisation for Economic Co-operation and Development
- International Organisation of Employers
- Confederation of Asia-Pacific Chambers of Commerce and Industry
- Confederation of Asia-Pacific Employers
- International Labour Organization

== Notable former staff ==
Former staff at the Australian Chamber include:

- Dan Tehan, a government minister who was the Australian Chamber's Director of Trade Policy and International Affairs in 2007–08.
- Nicolle Flint, a member of Parliament who was the Australian Chamber's Director of Corporate Relations in 2004–07.

== See also ==
- Economy of Australia
