= Santos Limited =

Australian energy company

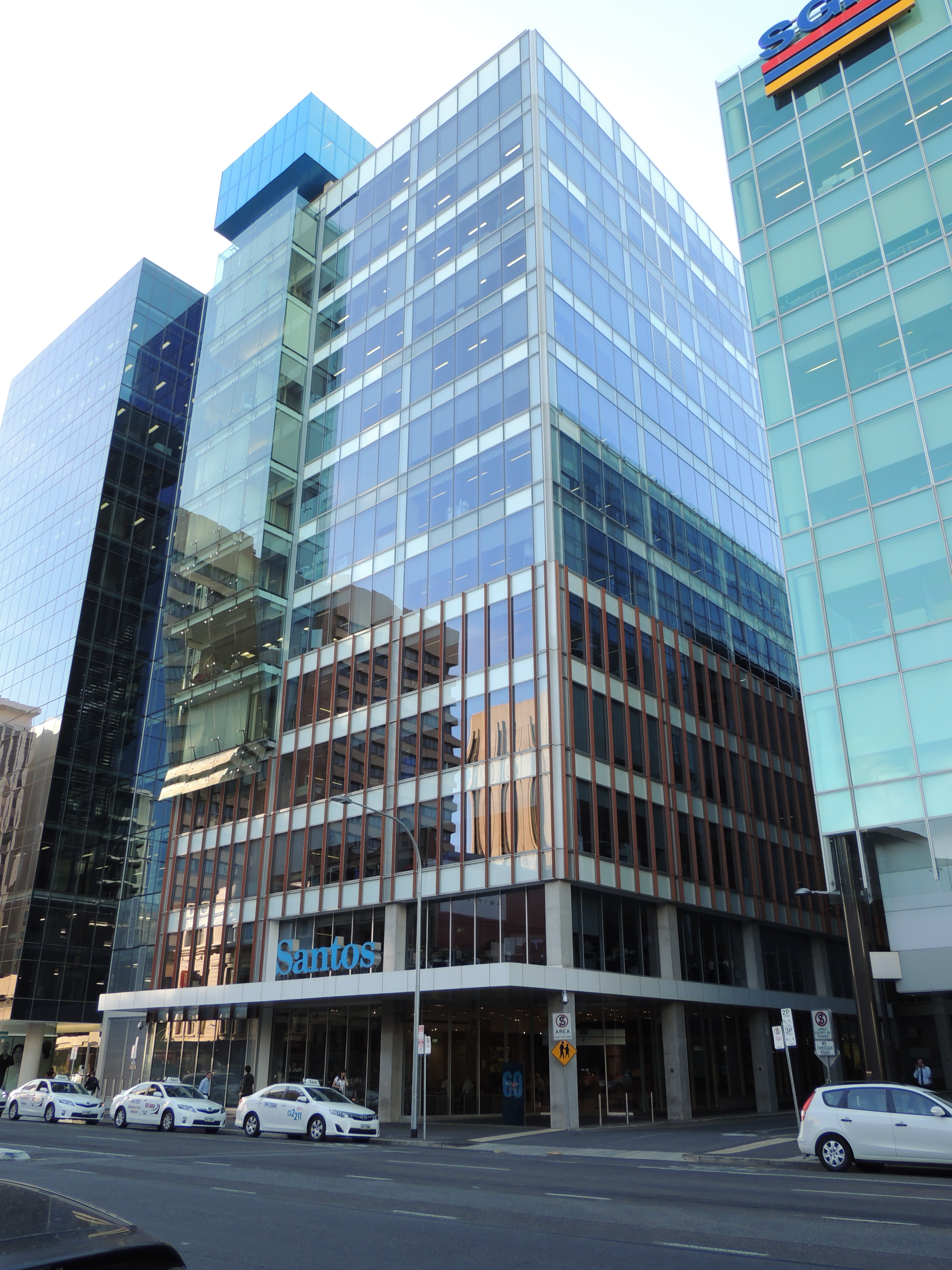
- Headquarters in Adelaide, Australia
- Type: Public
- Traded as: ASX: STO; S&P/ASX 200 component
- Industry: Energy
- Founded: 18 March 1954; 72 years ago
- Headquarters: 60 Flinders Street, Adelaide, South Australia
- Key people: Kevin Gallagher, CEO
- Products: Gas and petroleum exploration; Production, treatment and marketing of coal seam gas (CSG), liquefied natural gas (LNG), crude oil, condensate, naphtha and liquid petroleum gas (LPG); Transportation by pipeline of crude oil and gas
- Revenue: US$3.660 billion (2018)
- Net income: ▲US$0.727 billion (2018)
- Number of employees: 2,190 (2018)
- Website: santos.com

Santos Limited (named derived from South Australia and Northern Territory Oil Search) is an Australian oil and gas exploration and production company with headquarters in Adelaide, South Australia. It owns liquefied natural gas (LNG), pipeline gas, and oil assets. It is the biggest supplier of natural gas in Australia, with its plants in the Cooper Basin in South Australia and South West Queensland supplying the eastern states of Australia. Its operations also extend to the seas off Western Australia and Northern Territory. It is the 15th largest company in Australia as categorised by Forbes in their 2024 ranking.

The company has been criticised by environmentalists and others for its high level of greenhouse gas emissions, its lobbying of political parties, and various incidents causing contamination. Santos provides sponsorship of several arts festivals and bodies, charities, and the University of Adelaide's Australian School of Petroleum.

== History ==
The company came about after Robert Francis (Bob) Bristowe (1904-1959) and John Langdon Bonython, who had been school friends in Adelaide, partnered with a team of geologists led by Reg Sprigg and Helmut Wopfner tasked with finding oil.

Santos was incorporated on 18 March 1954, with its name an acronym of South Australia Northern Territory Oil Search. Geologist and Antarctic explorer Sir Douglas Mawson, who was appointed to the inaugural board, was responsible for adding "Northern Territory" to the name. Mawson, who had been involved in some early exploration in the Coorong area (1938–1941) and retained a lifelong interest in petroleum geology, resigned very soon afterwards due to ill-health, becoming an honorary consultant to the company. The other inaugural directors were Bonython, who chaired the board; Bristowe; George William Symes; and Henry Simpson Newland. In 1957, the directors included John Jenkinson, Hubert Harvey, and Bob Bristowe.

The core business of the company was initially built on gas discoveries in the Cooper Basin, South Australia, with the discovery and development of the Gidgealpa 2 well in 1963 and Moomba 1 in 1966. It signed supply contracts with the South Australian Gas Company, the Electricity Trust of South Australia and the Australian Gas Light Company, commencing supply in 1969.

After oil was discovered at Tirrawarra, near Moomba, South Australia, in the early 1970s, the company developed its liquid supply operations, which included a plant at Moomba and a fractionation and loading facility at Port Bonython.

In the 1990s, the company expanded, acquiring other companies and developing its operations both onshore and offshore in Australia, Indonesia, Malaysia, Vietnam and Papua New Guinea. Also in this decade it acquired interests in petroleum in the United States and United Kingdom, as well as operations in the Timor Sea and Western Australia. The Ballera gas plant in South West Queensland was established in 1991 and upgraded in 1997.

In 2015 Santos began producing LNG, shipping it to South Korea. In August 2018 Santos announced the acquisition of Australian oil and gas company Quadrant Energy for $2.15 billion. As part of the deal, Santos obtained Quadrant's 80% stake in Dorado in the Bedout Basin in northern Western Australia.

In May 2020 Santos completed its acquisition of ConocoPhillips' northern Australia and Timor-Leste assets for US$1.265 billion as well as a contingent payment of US$200 million, which gave Santos control of ageing offshore assets in Bayu-Undan, subsea assets in the Timor Sea, and onshore gas plant Darwin LNG (DLNG), which included the Bayu-Undan to Darwin Pipeline. At the completion of the deal with ConocoPhillips, the interest of Santos in these assets was increased to 68.4%, The sale was contingent on a final investment decision on the future #Barossa project, which once concluded increased Santos' interest in the project to 62.5%.

In December 2021, Santos bought Oil Search, the largest oil and gas exploration and development company incorporated in Papua New Guinea, which operated all of the country's oilfields.

== Description and governance ==
Santos is one of Australia's domestic gas and oil producers, supplying sales gas to all mainland Australian states and territories, ethane to Sydney, and oil and liquids to domestic and international customers. It is the biggest supplier of natural gas in Australia, Australia's second-largest independent producer of oil and natural gas, and was slated to become the world's biggest liquefied natural gas (LNG) exporter by 2019. In the 2020 Forbes Global 2000, Santos was ranked as the 1583rd-largest public company in the world.

Santos has its headquarters at 60 Flinders Street, Adelaide. It also has offices in Brisbane, Sydney, Perth and Jakarta.

Since 1 February 2016 and as of June 2022 the company's CEO has been Kevin Gallagher. He was preceded by David Knox.

== Operations ==
The South Australian and Queensland gas reserves are the main sources of natural gas to the eastern states of Australia. Santos is the primary venture partner and operator of natural gas processing facilities at Moomba in SA and Ballera in Queensland, and pipelines connecting those facilities with Adelaide, Sydney, Melbourne, Brisbane, Rockhampton and Mount Isa.

=== Gas and LNG ===
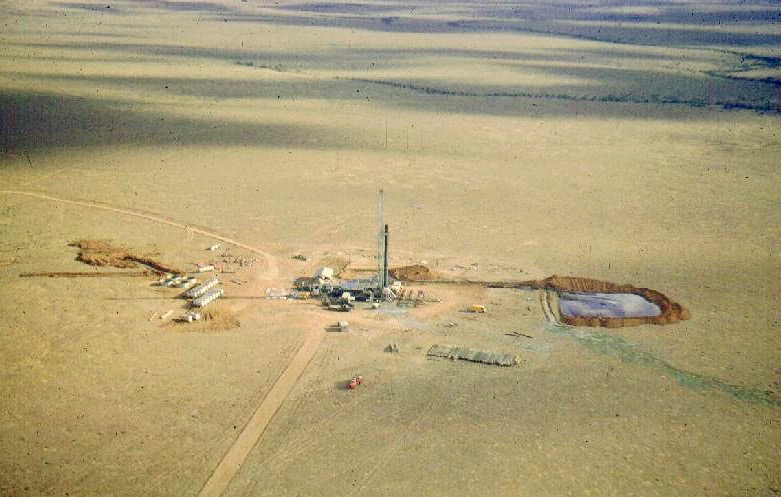
Santos drill rig near Innamincka (Cooper Basin), 1959

Santos has made significant discoveries in the Browse Basin, off the northwest of Western Australia. On 22 August 2014 the company announced a major gas condensate discovery at the Lasseter-1 exploration well in WA-274-P in the basin, in which Santos had a 30% interest in company with Chevron (50%) and Inpex (20%). It was the second major discovery by the company in the area in two years.

On 7 September 2017 Santos pledged to divert 30 petajoules of gas from the Gladstone LNG plant slated for export into Australia's east coast market in 2018 and 2019, as part of efforts to avert government-imposed restrictions on gas exports to solve local gas shortages. However, because of delays in developing its Narrabri coal seam gas project in NSW causing a shortfall in its own supply of gas for export, Santos instead relied on purchasing gas from the domestic market to supply its overseas contracts with Malaysia and South Korea. By 2025 wholesale gas prices had tripled on the Australian east coast market, leading to increased gas and electricity prices for retail consumers and threatening the viability of energy-intensive manufacturing industry. In December 2025 the Albanese government announced its plan to introduce a gas reservation policy, to take effect in 2027, forcing gas companies to reserve at least 15% of production for domestic use.

Santos has an interest in the Darwin LNG project, which was the first liquefied natural gas project in the Northern Territory and the second in Australia. It has been supplied by the Bayu-Undan field, which is anticipated will be exhausted during the 2020s, hence the intention to develop the Barossa project to replace the dwindling reserves.

==== Barossa project ====
The Barossa project is a proposed gas field in the Timor Sea, intended to take over from Bayu-Undan field after its reserves are exhausted, supplying LNG to the Darwin facility via a new pipeline which, for part of its length, run parallel to the existing Bayu-Undan to Darwin Pipeline. Condensate oil will also be extracted. It is situated around 300 km (190 mi) north of Darwin, in Australian waters. Worth A$4.7 billion, the project was signed off in 2021, with gas production is expected to commence in 2025. The project is expected to create about 600 jobs during construction and 350 ongoing jobs in Darwin over the following 20 years.

The project has been criticised for its future carbon emissions. If developed, Barossa would become the most carbon-intensive gas development in Australia. When the project was purchased from ConocoPhillips in 2020, it was projected to produce 1.5 tonnes of CO_{2} for every tonne of LNG. A 2021 report using the Darwin LNG project as a case study suggested that emissions could be greatly reduced by the use of solar power by using Sun Cable's Australia-Asia Power Link. but the Institute for Energy Economics and Financial Analysis (IEEFA) described the project as an "emissions factory with a gas by-product", saying that even if it employed carbon capture and storage, the project would continue to release financially risky carbon dioxide emissions at the site, onshore and across the whole supply chain.

The project has been the target of a number of high profile legal cases. In March 2022 leaders of the Jikilaruwu Tiwi Islands clan targeted the South Korean state-owned Export-Import Bank of Korea and the Korea Trade Insurance Corporation, which are planning to lend Santos approximately A$950m (£530m). The case failed in the Seoul District Court. In June 2022 traditional owners of the Tiwi Islands filed a lawsuit against Santos and the federal government, who they said had not properly consulted them. In the lawsuit Dennis Tipakalippa (senior lawman of the Munipi Clan) also argued that NOPSEMA, the federal offshore gas regulator, should not have approved Santos' plans to drill the Barossa gas field due to the Santos' inadequate consultation. The traditional owners are concerned about the effect on the nesting areas of flatback and olive ridley turtles, which provide one of the Aboriginal people's traditional food sources. Four federal government marine parks, including Ashmore Reef, are also in the vicinity. Santos has submitted an environmental impact plan, which includes the potential impact of an oil spill, and its plans for cleanup should one occur. In September 2022 Judge Mordecai Bromberg dismissed Santos' environmental plan, thus invalidating its authorisation for drilling. As a result Santos had to disconnect its drilling rig from the sea north of Melville Island and leave the Barossa field by 6 October 2022.

== Financial results ==
Santos' production for 2008 was 54.4 million barrels (8,650,000 m^{3}) of oil equivalent. Earnings before interest, taxes, depreciation, amortisations and exploration expenses for the period was A$2.8 billion, representing after tax profit of A$1.65 billion. On 22 August 2014 the company said its oil production was at its highest level in six years. For the first half of 2014, Santos recorded sales revenue of $1.8 billion, an increase of 20% on the comparable period the previous year. Sales volumes rose by 5% to 28.9 million barrels of oil equivalent. As a result of the company writing off its investment in a coal seam gas project in Indonesia, the 2014 first-half profit being down 24% at $206 million.

In 2015, Santos' financial troubles became more evident as the share price crashed to one third of its value from the previous year. It hit a 12-year low and has stayed low since. This occurred because of mounting debt and an oil price slump. CEO David Knox was forced to leave, with chairman Peter Coates stepping into the role and leading a strategic review of the gas company. Options of partial asset sale, even takeovers, has been speculated including "No options will be ruled out from consideration, but neither is any particular option a preferred course at this time," Coates said.

== Issues ==
=== Greenhouse gas emissions ===
In 2020, Santos was named on a list of Australia's 65 worst greenhouse gas emitting companies. Following additional pressure from ethical investors, Santos announced a goal to reduce greenhouse gas emissions to achieve net zero emissions by 2040 using a combination of carbon capture and storage, renewable energy and offsetting through tree planting programs.

=== Lobbying and political donations ===
Santos has engaged Adelaide-based consultancy Bespoke Approach to lobby the Australian Government and the state governments of New South Wales and Queensland. Other lobbyists which have represented Santos include: Kreab Gavin Anderson (Australia) Ltd, Craig Emerson Economics and Australian Public Affairs.

In the financial year 2012–13, Santos Ltd gave donations directly to the Labor, Liberal, and National political parties at state and federal levels. Donations are tabled below.

Jurisdiction	Liberal/LNP	Labor	National
Federal	$12,950	$50,829	$10,030
South Australia	$34,367	$18,590	
Queensland	$18,303	$3,300	
New South Wales	$500		
Western Australia	$5,910	$2,550	
Northern Territory		$5,000	
Tasmania	$2,500		
Sturt FEC (SA)	$1000		

== Incidents ==
=== Moomba explosions, South Australia ===
On 1 January 2004 an explosion occurred at Santos' Moomba processing facility. The blast was traced to the Liquids Recovery Plant (LRP), where an inlet manifold and a related flange weld both failed after corrosion by mercury. Mercury was released along with a cloud of flammable gases including methane, ethane, propane and butane. Workers saw the cloud and raised the alarm, shutting down the plant and evacuating to designated safety points. Some workers allegedly did not hear the emergency alarms. The gas cloud ignited on contact with a heating unit 150 metres away, and an explosion followed. The plant was seriously damaged.

Moomba workers who sought to remain anonymous told The Australian newspaper on 5 January that the company was running a "cowboy" operation, and that it was luck, not management that had prevented any loss of life. They also said that the emergency muster area was too close to the plant in the event of a major tank explosion.

Gas supplies to South Australia and New South Wales were interrupted, leading to down-time in the manufacturing sector and short-term rationing measures in both states while repairs were made. Santos spent $40 million on remedial action following the incident. In 2011, the South Australian industrial relations court ruled that 13 employees had been placed at risk due to critical safety shortcomings. These included an inadequate risk assessment which failed to identify the likelihood of plant failing due to liquid metal rendering it brittle. The company pleaded guilty to breaching the Occupational Health Safety and Welfare Act after a SafeWork prosecution and was fined $84,000.

=== Sidoarjo mud flow, Indonesia ===
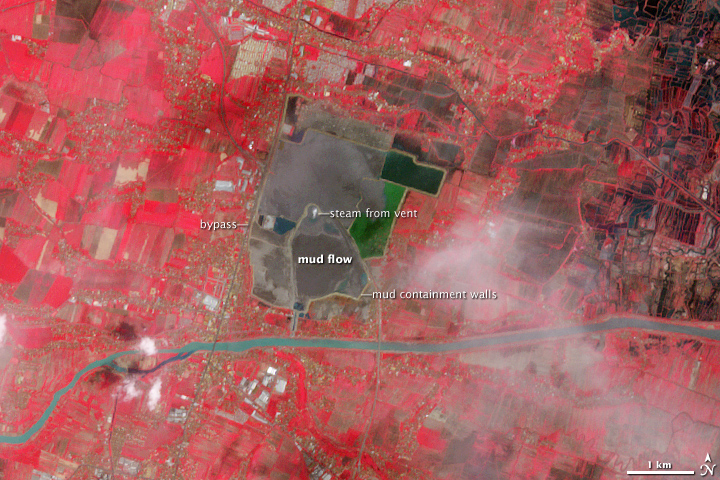
NASA satellite image of the Sidoarjo mud flow site, 11 November 2008

In May 2006, the Sidoarjo mud flow disaster occurred in East Java, Indonesia. Controversy exists surrounding the probable cause of the disaster which has displaced approximately 10,000 people and covered villages, farms and industrial areas with mud. The eruption is ongoing, though since 2011 the rate of flow has reduced.

Santos had stated in June 2006 that it maintained "appropriate insurance coverage for these types of occurrences".

=== Port Bonython groundwater contamination, South Australia ===
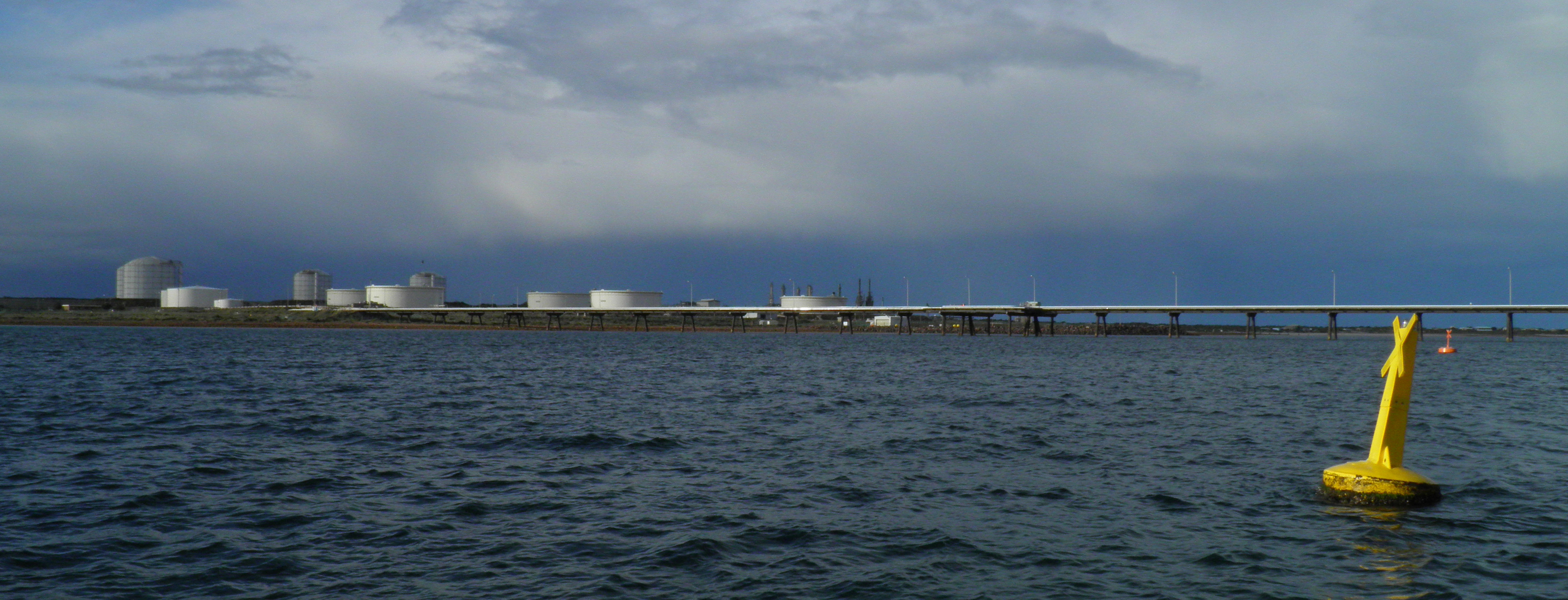
Santos' Port Bonython facility and hydrocarbon export jetty, South Australia

In May 2008, groundwater contamination was reported to the Environment Protection Authority (EPA) following detection at Santos' Port Bonython site, Spencer Gulf, South Australia. Hydrocarbons were found floating on and in the groundwater. One hundred and fifty inspection wells were later established, and a 450-metre-long (1,480 ft) cement bentonite wall was constructed 'to stop the further spread of contamination off-site' including to the marine environment. In May 2012, Santos reported declining rates of hydrocarbon recovery from groundwater extraction wells and claimed that their remediation efforts were working.

=== Pilliga CSG wastewater spill, New South Wales ===
In 2011, a 10,000-litre spill of untreated coal seam gas water occurred impacting native vegetation and soil in the Pilliga forest. Coal seam gas extraction produces water that can contain lead, mercury, various salts and other heavy metals. Rehabilitation has been trying to restore this site to remediate elevated contamination in the soil.

=== Jackson oil spill, Queensland ===
In May 2013, an uncontrolled oil spill was reported in Santos' Zeus field near Jackson in Queensland's remote south-west. The flow lasted 'almost a week' before international experts were able to contain it. The rate of flow was estimated at 50,000 litres per day.

=== Uranium contamination of Narrabri aquifers, New South Wales ===
In 2013, groundwater monitoring detected elevated levels of salinity and heavy metals near Santos' Tintsfield ponds in the Pilliga forest. Also it was reported that at the Bibblewindi ponds, uranium 20 times above the safe drinking levels was detected. A NSW Government investigation into the incident determined the leak was "small, localised and contained" and drinking water sources and stock and domestic water sources were not impacted nor were they at risk. The Investigation also found that the uranium detected was not from the pond's water, but was from naturally occurring Uranium in the surrounding soil that was mobilised from the leaking pond.

=== Climate activism ===
In March 2021, four Extinction Rebellion protesters glued themselves to the road outside the Santos building in Adelaide, and two scaled the building, painted messages on it, set off flares and glued themselves to the building. Police and firefighters had to remove them and the protesters, who included three women aged over 64, were charged. They were protesting against fracking, and called upon Santos to invest more in renewable energy.

Tiwi Islanders won a landmark case in September 2022, against drilling for gas by Santos in their traditional waters after complaining that the company failed to consult them about the impact of the project. Judge Mordecai Bromberg set aside approval for the drilling, part of Santos's $4.7bn Barossa project and gave Santos two weeks to shut down and remove its rig from the sea north of Melville Island. The Judge said the offshore oil and gas regulator Nopsema failed to assess whether Santos had consulted with everyone affected by the proposed drilling, as required by the law.

In 2024 Santos was granted permission to resume laying an underwater pipeline for the Barossa gas project in the Timor Sea, north of Darwin, after winning a legal battle against a group of Tiwi Islands elders. The case founded on the traditional accounts of the Ampiji and the Crocodile Man was characterised by a significant degree of divergence among relevant Tiwi Islanders about the content of those Dreaming or songlines. Justice Charlesworth also said she was not satisfied by claims the pipeline might damage potential cultural heritage sites along the sea floor.

The evidence established nothing more than a negligible chance that there may be objects of archaeological value in the area of the pipeline route.

=== Pipeline explosions ===
In January 2023, a gas pipeline exploded due to material fatigue. A similar event occurred in 2020. Both events were reported to the Government of South Australia, but neither was made public until they were discussed at the company's 2023 AGM and subsequently reported on by ABC news.

== Sponsorship ==
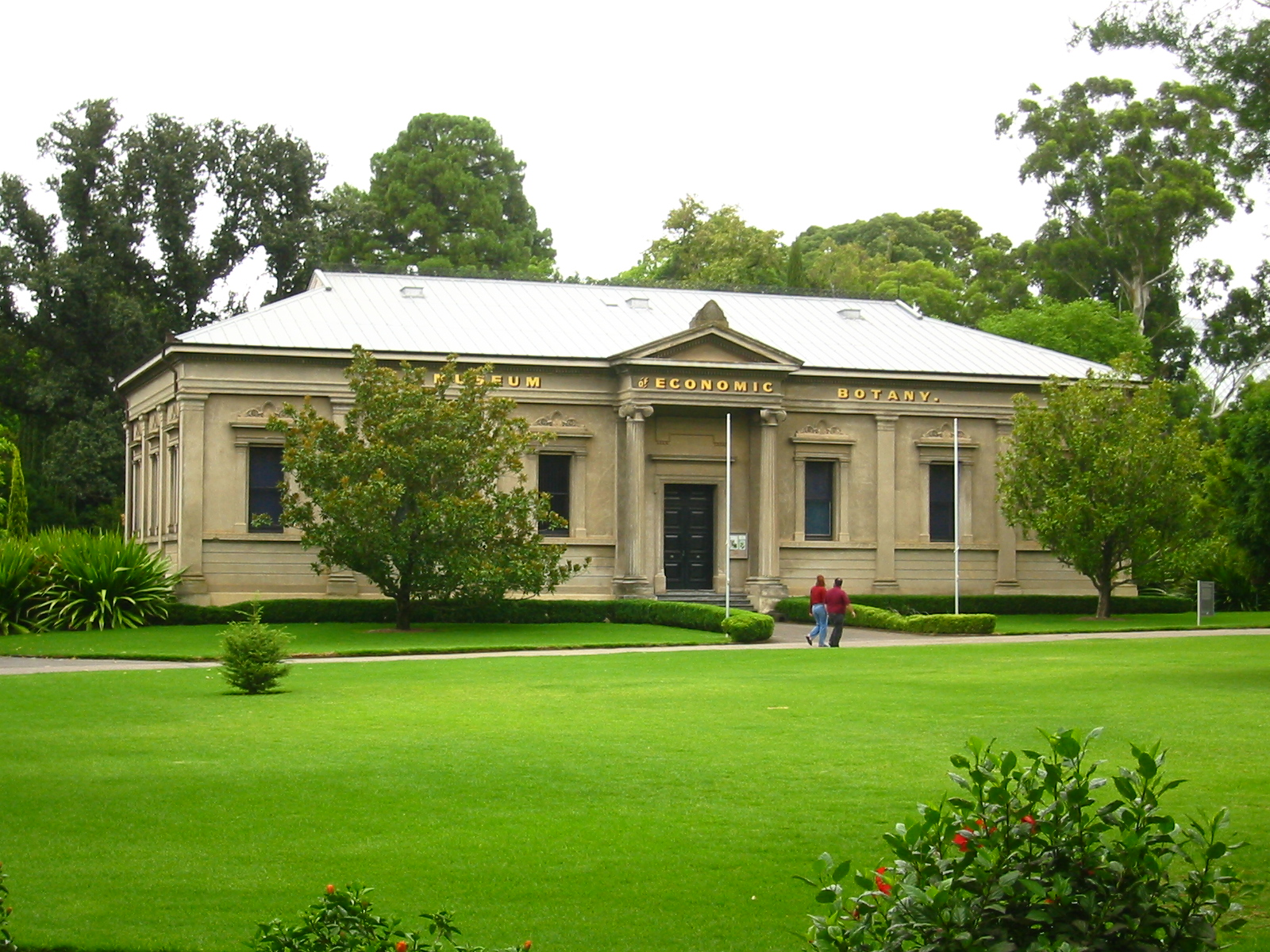
Santos sponsors the Museum of Economic Botany at the Adelaide Botanic Garden.

Santos sponsors many community activities, events, institutions and projects in jurisdictions where they operate commercially. In October 2014, The Advertiser claimed that Santos spends $10 million annually on South Australian community groups, events and institutions. Figures published in Santos' 2014 Sustainability Report state that $7,487,731 was spent on 'Community investment' in South Australia that financial year and $3,108,057 in Queensland. Other jurisdictions received between $5,000 (South Korea) and $775,255 (Western Australia) and the total 'community investment' spent across all regions during 2013–14 was $13,217,617.

=== South Australia ===
Recipients of financial support from Santos in South Australia have included:

- Adelaide Symphony Orchestra
- Art Gallery of South Australia
- Adelaide Botanic Garden
- Come Out Festival (2009) – People's Puppets Project, Whyalla
- Committee for Adelaide – founding member
- Museum of Economic Botany — naming rights from 2009 until September 2025
- OzAsia Festival
- Royal Institution of Australia – $5 million AUD foundation partner
- Santos Conservation Centre at the Adelaide Zoo
- Santos Stadium athletics venue
- Santos Tour Down Under UCI World Tour cycling event
- The Smith Family
- University of Adelaide – Australian School of Petroleum – $25 million AUD over 10 years

=== Queensland ===
Recipients of financial support from Santos in Queensland have included:

- Queensland Art Gallery – $1.5 million AUD over 5 years
- Santos GLNG Food & Fire Fest
- Queensland Police Service's Stay on Track Outback road safety campaign (2012–2014)

=== ANU divestment ===
In October 2014, the Australian National University (ANU) sold its shares in Santos and several other companies in the nation's most reported case of fossil fuel industry divestment. Santos responded by claiming that gas is necessary in the state's future energy mix, and The Advertiser published its economic value to South Australia. It was reported that Santos employed 3500 people nationally as well as thousands of contractors, and had a $13 billion market value. Politicians expressing their support for the company included the Prime Minister Tony Abbott and federal MPs Jamie Briggs, Christopher Pyne, James McGrath, Greg Hunt and Treasurer Joe Hockey. Several senior state ministers also spoke out against the decision to divest in South Australia and Queensland, including South Australian Treasurer Tom Koutsantonis. Former Liberal party leaders John Hewson and Malcolm Fraser both supported ANU's right to choose how and where to invest its money. ANU chancellor Gareth Evans said that the university had not described Santos as a "socially irresponsible" company, and in a letter to Santos CEO David Knox, Evans said the university regretted any embarrassment suffered by Santos over the decision to divest.

=== Opposition to Santos sponsorship ===
In December 2014, photographs showing Queensland police vehicles featuring Santos company logos was criticised by anti-coal seam gas group Lock the Gate Alliance. Santos contributed approximately $40,000 to the road safety program "stay on track outback" which was described as valuable addition to a road safety campaign. Queensland Police commissioner Ian Stewart described the vehicles as "PR vehicles that we use at shows, we use at expos, all of those sorts of things just as any PR machine would be used by a company or another government organisation."

Online activists referred to the sponsorship as a "conflict of interest" and "a bloody disgrace" with Stop Brisbane Coal Trains spokesman John Gordon calling for the logos to be removed. Santos responded by stating that the company was "proud to support a program that promotes safe driving and is saving lives in outback Australia." Queensland's Police Minister Jack Dempsey defended the program and its sponsors stating "The Queensland Police Service's 'Stay on Track Outback' is a road safety program aimed at keeping communities safer and reducing road trauma in regional Queensland. It has been in place since 2012 thanks to support from a number of sponsors."

In 2015, the Frack Free NT Alliance (a diverse group of opposing shale gas in the Northern Territory) called for the Darwin Festival to reject Santos sponsorship due to the company's involvement in shale gas exploration and development in the Northern Territory. Dayne Pratzky, a.k.a. Frackman, supported the call. On 19 October 2022, Santos announced they would not renew their 20 year funding agreement with the Darwin Festival.

In 2021 and 2022, Extinction Rebellion held protests at the Adelaide Botanic Garden to denounce Santos' sponsorship of the Santos Museum of Economic Botany. Extinction Rebellion spokesperson Ben Brooker described the arrangement, slated to last until 2029, as "a terrible stain on this treasured institution" and one that "goes absolutely against the letter and the spirit of the Garden's own charter, which of course has biodiversity and conservation at its heart", adding that "we just do not feel that those values are compatible with taking money from an incredibly destructive fossil fuel company".

== See also ==
- Moomba Adelaide Pipeline System
