= Museum of Economic Botany =

Museum in Australia

Santos Museum of Economic Botany
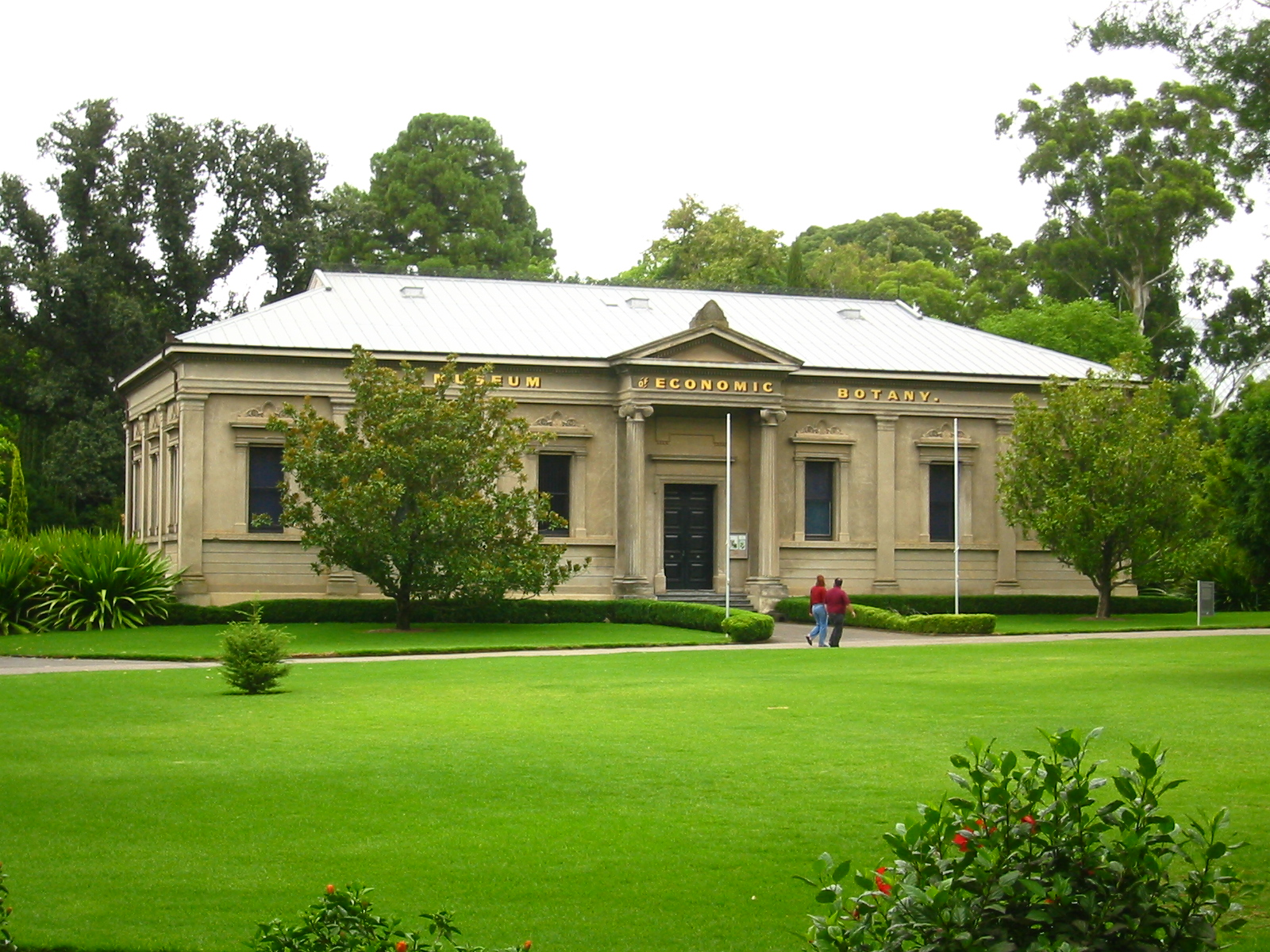
- The Museum of Economic Botany

- Location within South Australia
- Established: 1881
- Location: North Terrace, Adelaide, South Australia
- Coordinates: 34°55′05″S 138°36′41″E
- Type: economic botany
- Website: https://www.botanicgardens.sa.gov.au/visit/adelaide-botanic-garden/santos-museum-economic-botany

The Museum of Economic Botany, formerly known as Santos Museum of Economic Botany, is a museum of economic botany located in the Adelaide Botanic Garden, Adelaide, Australia. Opened in 1881, the museum is the only remaining museum of its kind in Australia.

== History ==
The Museum of Economic Botany, which opened on 27 May 1881, was inspired by the museum in museum in Kew Gardens, London, which opened in 1847. Upon opening, the Museum of Economic Botany displayed 3500 objects specifically designed to show the link between the raw material and the final consumer product. Its first director was Richard Schomburgk, who drew on his international network of like-minded botanists to gather a wealth of content.

The building also included an annexe, the Herbarium, which housed over 18,000 dried plants.

After his death, Schomburgk's successor, director Holtze, was not proactive in building the collection further, and the last significant shipment of items for the collection came from Kew in 1893.

The museum suffered from lack of funding during the 1930s, and in 1933, gave its whole collection of books to the Public Library Board (now the State Library of South Australia). In 1940 it granted the remaining Herbarium collection to the University of Adelaide.

In 1955, director Noel Lothian re-established the Herbarium. In the 1970s, modernisation of the building was undertaken, which included the installation of electric lighting was for the first time in 1978. In 1979, the ivy which had covered the façade for decades was removed, and the lettering on the frontage regilded. The building was inscribed on the South Australian Heritage Register in 1982.

In 1983, the building was vandalised multiple times, which led to a temporary closure.

In 2007, the Botanic Garden obtained a grant of A$1.125 million from the federal government to completely refurbish the museum for the first time in decades, and the museum was closed to the public for much of 2007 and 2008. The restoration of the building was carried out by Grieve Gillett Architects.

In 2009, oil and gas company Santos made a A$2 million investment in the Adelaide Botanic Garden, which gave it naming rights to the museum until 2029. This financial support, given between 2009 and 2017, helped to finance the restoration of the building and to support educational programs and the work of the SA Seed Conservation Centre.

The climate activist group Extinction Rebellion criticised the agreement, and held numerous protests at the Museum in 2022 to highlight the incongruity of a fossil fuel company sponsoring an institution dedicated to conservation and biodiversity. The group called on the Adelaide Botanic Garden to drop Santos as a sponsor and fully divest from the fossil fuel industry. In 2023, the South Australian arts community signed an open letter on the same issue, saying that "organisations like the Botanic Garden have a responsibility to be cultural leaders".

In September 2025 the "Santos" part of the name was removed from the building. A spokesperson for the museum said that it was looking at new partnership opportunities that better align with their current strategic plan.

== Description ==
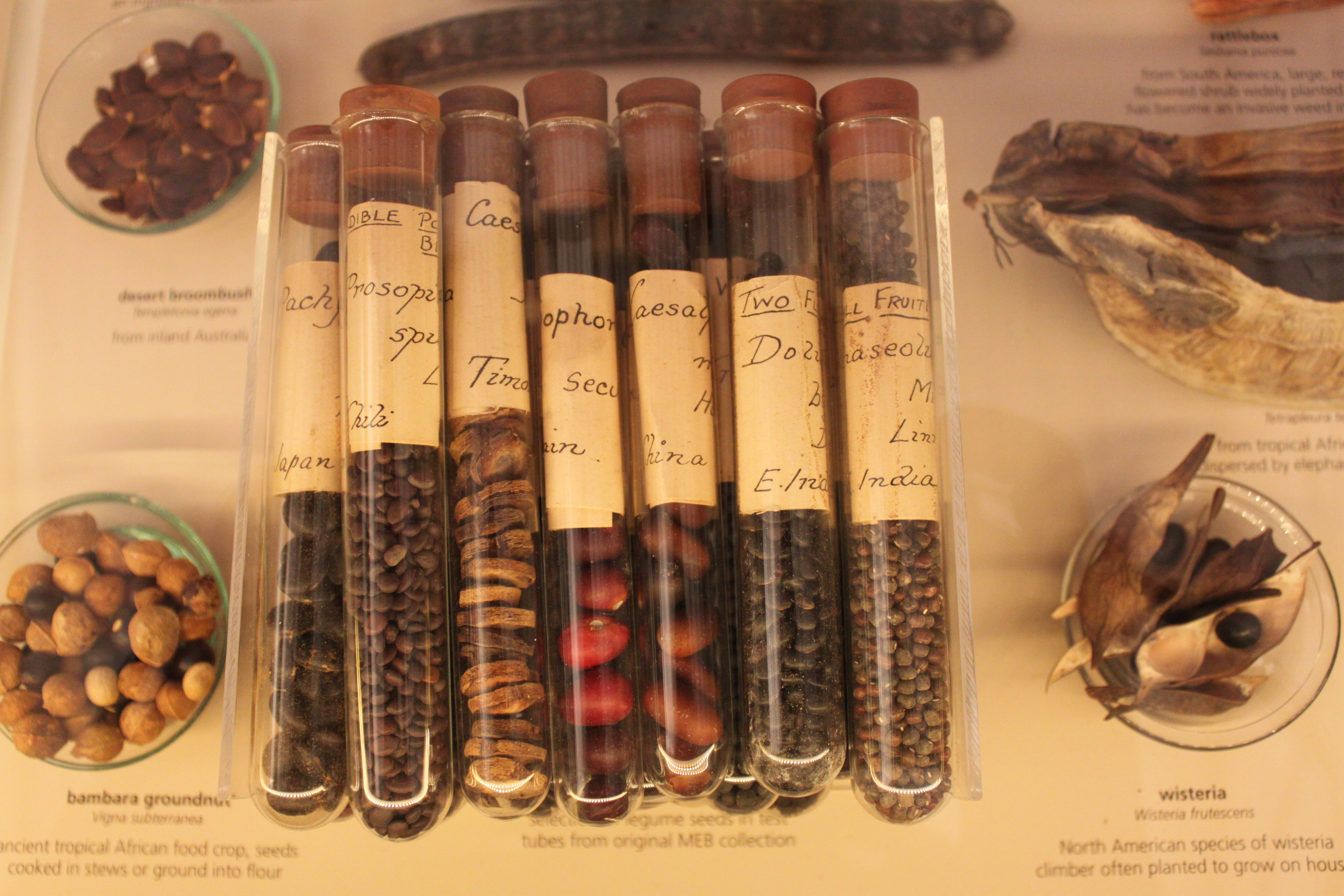
Seeds on display in the museum

The Museum of Economic Botany is located in the Adelaide Botanic Gardens in Adelaide, South Australia. It is the sole remaining museum of its kind in Australia.

The museum displays a permanent collection exhibiting the practical, medicinal, and economic use of plant materials. The plant materials on display include essential oils, gums and resins, fibre plants, dyes, food and beverage plants, and others. As of 2018 it was displaying over 3000 specimens, representing 99% of collected material. It also regularly hosts contemporary art exhibitions, such as Tamar Dean's photographic exhibition as part of the Adelaide Festival in 2018.

== Architecture ==
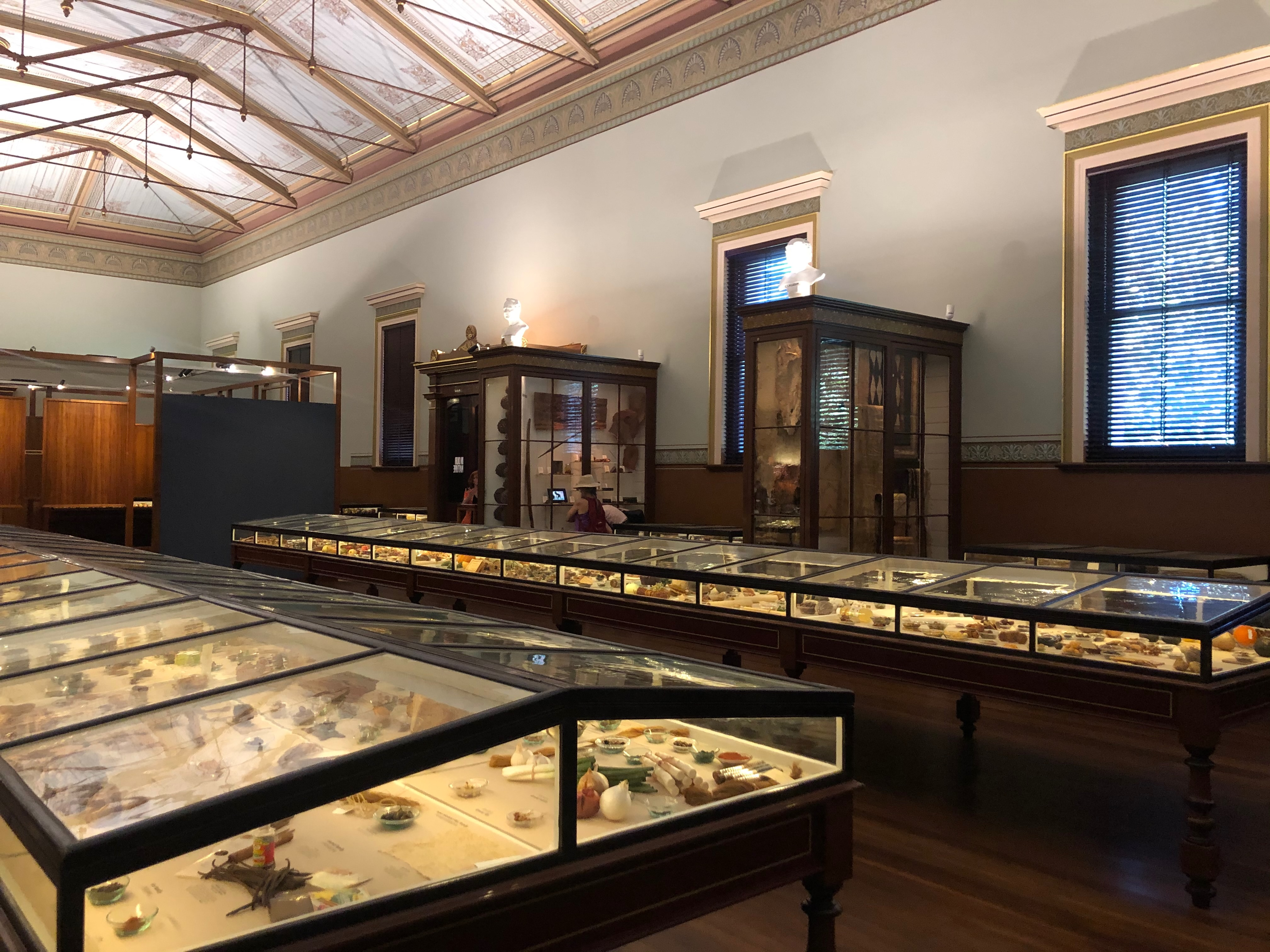
Interior of the Museum of Economic Botany, Adelaide

The Greek-Revival building was explicitly designed to follow the example of Kew Gardens. Construction of the building began in 1879 and finished in 1881, costing £2900. It had 16 windows each 8 ft (2.4 m) high, designed to allow in a large amount of sunlight.

With its Greek-Revival style facade, the Museum was listed on the now-defunct Register of the National Estate on 21 October 1980 and on the South Australian Heritage Register on 23 September 1982.

It underwent restoration from 2009 by Grieve Gillett Architects, starting with the interiors and then working on the exterior after the museum was reopened to the public. The refurbishment earnt the 2012 Australian Institute of Architects (SA) David Saunders Award for Heritage Architecture.
