= Ron Manners =

Australian businessman

Ron Manners AO FAICD FAusIMM
- Born: Ronald Brown Manners; 8 January 1936 (age 90); Kalgoorlie, Western Australia
- Education: Kalgoorlie School of Mines
- Occupations: Businessman & prospector

Ronald Brown Manners (born 8 January 1936) is an Australian businessman. He is the founder and formerly the chairman of Croesus Mining, at one point Australia's third largest gold producer. He is currently the executive chairman of Mannwest Group and founder and chairman of the Mannkal Economic Education Foundation, an Australian free-market think tank. Manners was one of the founders of the Workers Party, subsequently known as the Progress Party, and is a co-founder of ANDEV (Australians for Northern Development and Economic Vision), a lobby group chaired by co-founder Gina Rinehart. Manners' contribution to the mining industry earned him induction into the Australian Mining Hall of Fame in 2011. Manners was made an Officer of the Order of Australia (AO) in the 2020 Australia Day Honours for "distinguished service to the minerals and mining sectors, and to youth through philanthropic support for educational initiatives," and in 2021 was nominated for the 2021 WA Senior Australian of the Year Award.

== Biography ==
=== Early life ===
Ron Manners was born in 1936 in Kalgoorlie, Australia, to a family that had a long association with the mining town. His grandfather, W.G. Manners, the son of a Ballarat prospector, headed West in the late 19th century and established a mining and engineering business, W.G. Manners & Co, in 1895. Ron Manners studied electrical engineering at the Kalgoorlie School of Mines.

=== Career in mining ===
In 1955, Manners assumed management of the family business. He expanded and diversified the company which became the Mannwest Group. He serves as its executive director.

Between 1972 and 1995, he floated several Australian listed mining companies. In 1985, he founded Croesus Mining NL, a gold mining company. He served as its chairman from 1985 to 2005. While chairman, the company produced 1.275 million ounces of gold and paid 11 dividends. He has also served as Non Executive Chairman of De Grey Mining Ltd.

He is emeritus chairman, patron of the Australian Prospectors & Miners' Hall of Fame, inducted in 2011 as a "living legend". He also served as Executive Councillor of the Association of Mining and Exploration Companies (AMEC). He is a Fellow of both the Australasian Institute of Mining and Metallurgy and the Australian Institute of Company Directors. He was elected "mining legend" at the 2005 Excellence in Mining & Exploration Conference in Sydney. In 2012, he defended Gina Rinehart against Wayne Swan in her bid to invest in Fairfax Media.

Manners was made an Officer of the Order of Australia (AO) in the 2020 Australia Day Honours for "distinguished service to the minerals and mining sectors, and to youth through philanthropic support for educational initiatives," and in 2021 was nominated for the 2021 WA Senior Australian of the Year Award.

=== Other activity ===
A proponent of the free market, he founded the Mannkal Economic Education Foundation in 1997. He is a member and director of the Mont Pelerin Society and is on the Co-ordinating Committee for the Commonwealth Study Conference. In 2010 he was appointed to the Board of Overseers for the Atlas Economic Research Foundation in Washington, D.C.

== Bibliography ==
As author

- Mannerisms (1985–2020) (2020) ISBN 978-0-9942638-1-0
- The Lonely Libertarian (Turning Ideas Into Gold—Then Gold Into Ideas) (2019) ISBN 978-1-925-82657-9
- Heroic Misadventures (Australia: Four Decades-Full Circle) (2009) ISBN 978-0-646-52212-8. OCLC 455934757
- Never a Dull Moment (with Charles Manners and Nancy Manners) (2002) ISBN 0-85905-174-9. OCLC 52697697
- Poems of Passion (1979–2020) (self published poems, 2020) ISBN 978-0-959-12030-1. OCLC 222633611

As editor

- Kanowna's barrowman: James Balzano, 1859-1948: the early history of Kalgoorlie's goldrushes (with George Compton) (1993) ISBN 0-85905-176-5. OCLC 38335683
- So I Headed West – W.G. Manners (1992) ISBN 0-85905-123-4. OCLC 31700388
