= List of largest Australian companies =

This article lists the largest companies in Australia in terms of their revenue, net profit and total assets, according to the American business magazines Fortune and Forbes.

== 2024 Fortune list ==
This list displays all five Australian companies in the Fortune Global 500, which ranks the world's largest companies by annual revenue. The figures below are given in millions of US dollars and are for the fiscal year 2023. Also listed are the headquarters location, net profit, number of employees worldwide and industry sector of each company.

Rank	Fortune 500 rank	Name	Industry	Revenue (USD millions)	Profits (USD millions)	Employees	Headquarters
1	268	BHP	Mining	53,817	12,921	42,319	Melbourne
2	323	ANZ Bank	Banking	46,929	4,724	40,343	Melbourne
3	353	Woolworths	Retail	43,257	1,089	200,364	Sydney
4	449	National Australia Bank	Banking	34,450	4,934	35,516	Melbourne
5	484	Commonwealth Bank	Banking	32,981	6,789	49,454	Sydney

== 2024 Forbes list ==
This list is based on the Forbes Global 2000, which ranks the world's 2,000 largest publicly traded companies. The Forbes list takes into account a multitude of factors, including the revenue, net profit, total assets and market value of each company; each factor is given a weighted rank in terms of importance when considering the overall ranking. The table below also lists the headquarters location and industry sector of each company. The figures are in billions of US dollars and are for the year 2024. All 31 Australian companies in the Forbes 2000 are listed.

Rank	Forbes 2000 rank	Name	Headquarters	Revenue (billions US$)	Profit (billions US$)	Assets (billions US$)	Value (billions US$)	Industry
1	69	Commonwealth Bank	Sydney	39.0	6.5	870.7	135.4	Banking
2	116	BHP	Melbourne	55.3	7.3	100.0	152.1	Mining
3	125	National Australia Bank	Melbourne	38.7	4.6	698.7	7.5	Banking
4	132	ANZ Bank	Melbourne	40.9	4.6	710.9	56.5	Banking
5	144	Westpac	Sydney	35.4	4.3	686.8	62.1	Banking
6	266	Macquarie Group	Sydney	19.6	2.2	264.0	46.6	Finance
7	392	Fortescue	Perth	18.6	5.8	29.9	55.4	Iron and Steel
8	437	CSL	Melbourne	14.1	2.5	37.3	90.5	Pharmaceutical
9	505	Woodside Energy	Perth	14.0	1.6	55.4	34.9	Oil and gas
10	564	Wesfarmers	Perth	28.9	1.7	18.6	51.9	Conglomerate
11	624	QBE Insurance	Sydney	21.7	1.4	34.9	17.6	Insurance
12	627	Telstra	Melbourne	15.1	1.3	31.1	28.4	Telecommunications
13	777	Suncorp	Brisbane	11.8	0.8	73.1	13.8	Insurance
14	860	Woolworths	Sydney	43.6	-5.3	22.6	25.8	Retail
15	999	Santos	Adelaide	6.0	1.4	31.1	16.4	Oil and gas
16	1019	Coles Group	Melbourne	27.9	0.7	13,3	14.6	Retail
17	1238	Origin Energy	Sydney	10.4	1.1	13.0	11.4	Utilities
18	1357	Qantas	Sydney	13.7	1.1	13.2	6.4	Airline
19	1360	Aristocrat Leisure	Sydney	4.3	0.9	6.8	19.6	Gambling
20	1427	Transurban	Melbourne	2.8	0.2	24.8	25.7	Transportation
21	1537	Goodman Group	Sydney	1.3	0.2	15.7	43.6	Real estate
22	1365	Brambles	Sydney	6.4	0.8	8.8	13.3	Services
23	1639	Insurance Australia Group	Sydney	8.4	0.5	17.0	10.1	Insurance
24	1688	Ampol	Sydney	24.9	0.4	9.1	5.6	Oil and gas
25	1765	Bendigo and Adelaide Bank	Bendigo	3.0	0.3	67.9	2.6	Banking
26	1734	Bank of Queensland	Brisbane	11.5	0.2	65.9	2.6	Banking
27	1811	BlueScope	Melbourne	11.5	0.5	10.4	6.3	Iron and Steel
28	1863	Ramsay Health Care	Sydney	10.6	0.6	14.1	7.6	Health care
28	1863	Viva Energy	Melbourne	17.8	2.5	6.6	3.6	Oil and gas
30	1915	Scentre Group	Sydney	1.7	0.2	24.3	11.1	Real estate
31	1967	Wisetech Global	Sydney	0.6	0.1	1,9	21.7	Software

== See also ==
- List of largest companies by revenue
