= Bayu-Undan to Darwin Pipeline =

Subsea gas pipeline off northern Australia

Location
- Country: Timor-Leste and Australia
- State: Northern Territory
- Direction: Along south-east
- Start: Bayu-Undan field
- To: Darwin

General information
- Type: natural gas
- Contractors: Multiplex-Saipem
- Construction started: 2004
- Commissioned: 2006

Technical information
- Length: 502 km (312 mi)

The Bayu-Undan to Darwin Pipeline, also known as the Bayu-Undan Gas Export Pipeline or Gas Export Pipeline (GEP), is a multi-diameter subsea gas export pipeline which transported dry gas from the Bayu-Undan field in the Timor Sea to the Darwin LNG plant at Wickham Point, near Darwin, Northern Territory from 2006 to 2023.

== History ==
Originally Phillips Petroleum Company had plans to design and build a dry gas export pipeline from Bayu-Undan to Timor-Leste. But in June 2001 it decided to send the gas to Darwin after failing to reach an agreement about fiscal, legal and tax arrangements with the East Timorese government.

The Gas Export Pipeline (GEP) formed part of Phase 2 of the Bayu-Undan Development project. Phase 1 focussed only on LPG and condensate production from the infield assets located within ZOCA, later known as JPDA. For the first time in 2006 compressed dry gas was exported from the CPP through the subsea pipeline to Australia, where it was liquefied at the 3.71 million tonne per annum Liquefied Natural Gas (LNG) plant. Prior to the construction and operation of the GEP the Bayu-Undan field was commonly referred to as the Bayu-Undan Gas Recycle Project.

ConocoPhillips Pipeline Australia Pty Ltd (COPPA) was the original operator of the pipeline, until the sale of the asset to Santos Limited, which started in 2019.

== Description ==
Most of the pipeline's total length of 502.6 km (312.3 mi) is made up of welded 26 in (660 mm) diameter pipe, although closer to the Bayu-Undan Central Production Platform (CPP) the pipeline consists of flanged spools and a riser of 28 in (710 mm) nominal diameter. There is a remotely-operated 28 inch subsea isolation valve (SSIV) close to the CPP. A transition flange denotes the change in diameter from 28 inch to 26 inch.

The pipeline lies directly on the seabed from Bayu-Undan to the entrance into Darwin Harbour. Within Darwin Harbour the pipeline is installed in a trench below seabed level and is further protected from dragged or dropped anchors by a protective rock berm. Water depth within the harbour is typically less than 10 m deep and this zone is predominantly intertidal. Most of the linepipe used during the construction was factory-coated with concrete-weight-coating in order to provide pipeline stabilisation, thus restricting lateral movement of the pipeline whilst minimising movement of seabed material.

== Maintenance and repair ==
A significant number of free-spans develop under the pipeline due to subsea currents and movement of seabed material. As a result grout bags are regularly installed by ROV in an attempt to restore support and to minimise the occurrence of vortex-induced vibrations (VIV) along the pipeline.

The subsea pipeline is also subjected to in-line inspection (ILI) using a magnetic-flux leakage intelligent pig. The pig is launched from the Bayu-Undan CPP facility in the Timor Sea and is retrieved at the pig receiver at Darwin LNG after transiting through the 502 km pipeline. A by-product of the pigging operation is iron oxide dust (from the internal walls of the pipeline at the welded joints and margins), laced with radioactive NORM, and BTEX from the production wells and process at Bayu-Undan. The water used to clean the pigging contractor's pigs is also contaminated with NORM. This pigging waste is stored at the Darwin LNG facility in various forms, including a collection of IBC.

== Cessation and uncertain future ==
Due to the depletion of the hydrocarbon reserves in the Bayu-Undan field this pipeline officially stopped transportation of dry gas to Darwin by the end of 2023, resulting in the last liquefied natural gas (LNG) shipment from the 3.7 MTPA Darwin LNG plant on 11 November 2023. The 2004-built 135,423 cbm LNG carrier MV Seapeak Madrid loaded the last cargo and headed to Japan.

As development of the new Barossa field incurs unexpected delays, the Bayu-Undan to Darwin Pipeline will remain out of service as uncertainty persists about the feasibility of re-purposing it to transport carbon dioxide to the Bayu Undan field for sequestration. Santos intended to continue employing Timor Leste nationals on the remaining Bayu Undan platform as part of the carbon capture and sequestration (CCS) process.

The cessation of production of the Bayu-Undan to Darwin Pipeline has also impacted the production and supply of helium by BOC in Darwin. BOC's plant, located next to Santos' Darwin LNG plant, was the only helium production plant in the southern hemisphere, it produced 3 per cent of the global supply, and the helium produced was used in welding equipment, scuba diving gear, MRI scanners in hospitals, as well as in the manufacture of solar panels and microchips.

Another impact of the 2023 cessation of this pipeline is increased insecurity of gas supply to customers located within the Northern Territory. Indeed the DLNG to PWC Pipeline, also known as Darwin LNG Lateral, has lost a potential supply of gas.
