= Stephen Koroknay =

Australian oil company executive

Steven Joseph Koroknay was an Australian oil company executive. He was born in Hungary about 1946. He was the executive chairman of Anzon Australia. He died on 6 June 2013.

Koroknay's career in the international oil and gas industry began at Esso Australia. Before becoming the Technical Manager of Esso's upstream activities in Australia, he was the Assistant Area Manager for the Esso/BHP Bass Strait operation, which at the time included twelve offshore platforms producing oil and gas, associated pipelines and three onshore processing plants. During the 15 years he worked for Esso, he also had various assignments in the United States.

Koroknay left Esso to take up the position of Manager of Production and Engineering with Bridge Oil, where he rose to the position of Executive Director–Resources. He remained at Bridge Oil for ten years, during which the growth of Bridge Oil was principally achieved through a strategy of acquisition of oil and gas producing assets in Australia and the United States. Bridge Oil was acquired by Parker and Parsley Petroleum in 1994. After Bridge was taken over, Koroknay was appointed CEO of Aztec Mining, but the company was promptly taken over by Normandy Poseidon.

Koroknay was a councillor of Australian Petroleum Production & Exploration Association and the chairman of the Advisory Board for the School of Petroleum Engineering at the University of New South Wales. He was a Fellow of the Australian Institute of Company Directors, the Australian Institute of Mining and Metallurgy and the Institution of Engineers, Australia; an executive director and shareholder of Anzon Energy, a substantial shareholder in Anzon Australia; and a founding director of Anzon Australia Limited.

On 10 June 2010, Koroknay became non-executive chairman of Galilee Energy, an ASX-listed coal and coal-seam gas energy company. He served as a director of Innamincka Petroleum Ltd and as a nonexecutive director of Cue Energy Resources, Eastern Corporation, and Metgasco.

In 2003, he was a director of Indonesian oil company, Interra Resources.
