= Géza Koroknay =

Hungarian actor

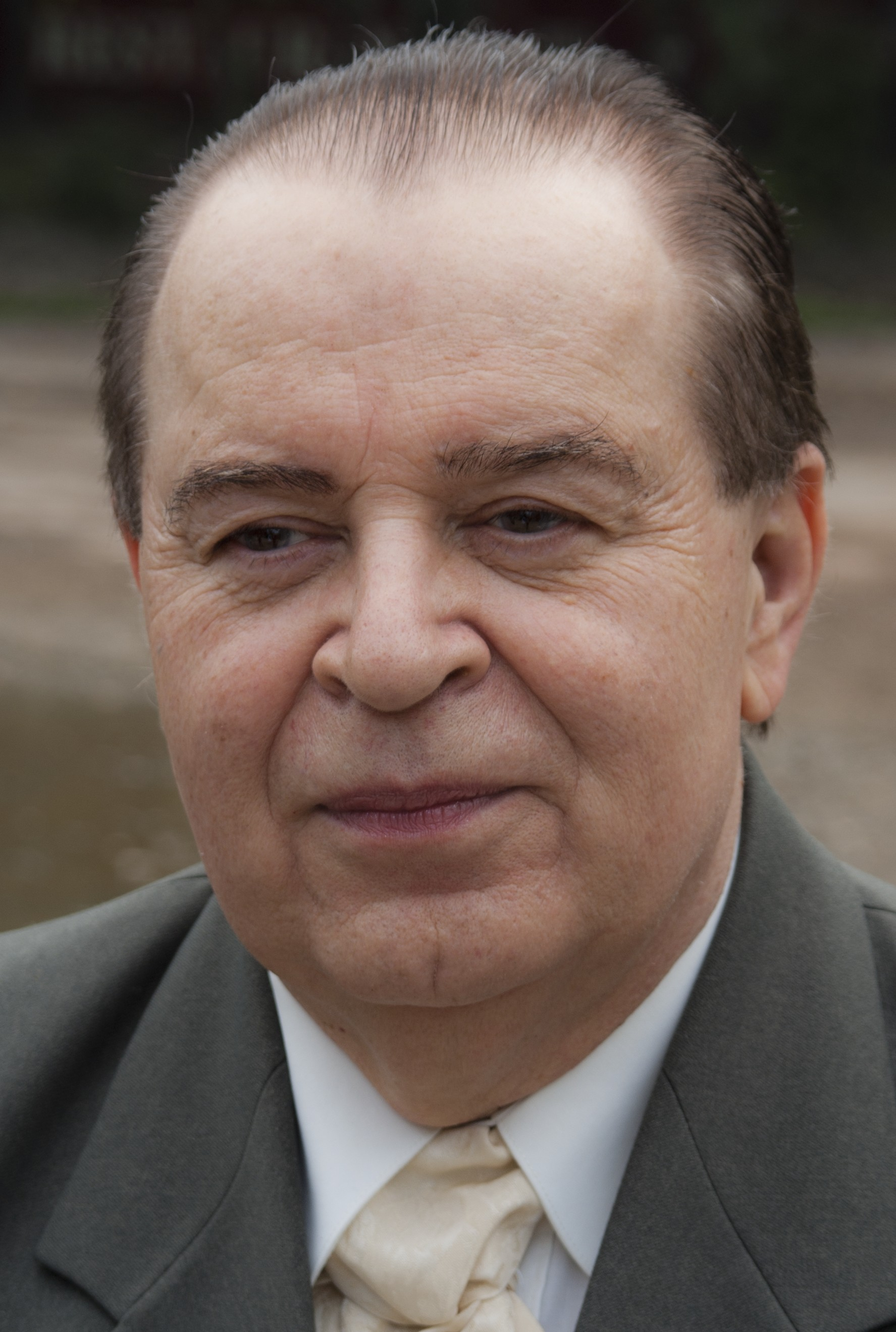
- Born: 29 September 1948; Budapest, Hungary
- Died: 2 January 2013 (aged 64)
- Occupation: Actor
- Years active: 1972–2012

Géza Koroknay (29 September 1948 – 2 January 2013) was a Hungarian actor, most notable for his work on the Hungarian television show Szomszédok (Neighbors).

== Biography ==
Born in Budapest in 1948, Koroknay graduated from the Academy of Drama and Film in 1972. He was soon contracted into the National Theatre of Miskolc acting troupe and was a member of the National Theatre of Pécs from 1974 to 1976. Since then, he was a voice actor for a number of films and television shows, including dubbing some of the Dirty Harry films into Hungarian, to name a few. He also took on some small television roles. He spent his later years as a narrator of documentaries and commercials.

Koroknay died on 2 January 2013, following a lengthy illness.

== Filmography ==
- 2012: Barátok közt ... Dezső Winkler (2 episodes)
- 2000: Pasik
- 1993–1997: Kisváros ... Szabó/Cseresznyés (4 episodes)
- 1993: Privát kopó ... Félelem ára
- 1987–1991: Szomszédok ... László (52 episodes)
- 1990: Angyalbőrben ... Csatár őrnagy
- 1989: Labdaálmok
- 1986: A falu jegyzője
- 1972: Fekete macska ... Suhanc
