= Australian Energy Producers =

Australian oil and gas industry association

Australian Energy Producers is an Australian industry association representing companies which explore and produce oil and gas in Australia. Australian Energy Producers is a non-profit organisation. The current Chief Executive is Samantha McCulloch.

The organisation was originally established in 1959 as the Australian Petroleum Exploration Association (APEA) and until September 2023 was known as the Australian Petroleum Production and Exploration Association (APPEA).

== Australian Energy Producers Conference ==
The organisation hosts the annual Australian Energy Producers Conference and Exhibition. In 2010 the then 'APPEA' conference won "Association or Government Meeting of the Year" award from Meetings & Events Australia.

The Australian Energy Producers Journal (ISSN 1326-4966) is produced each year in conjunction with the conference and is distributed to conference attendees. The first edition of the Australian Energy Producers (then APEA) Journal was published in 1961. The Australian Energy Producers journal is listed on the ERA (Excellence in Research for Australia) 2012 Journal List as ERAID 1707.

== Former directors ==
- James Pearson (2000–2002)

== See also ==
- Energy law
