= Australian Institute of Company Directors =

Organisation supporting company directors in Australia

Coordinates: 33.868989°S 151.209631°E

- Abbreviation: AICD
- Formation: 1 January 1990; 36 years ago
- Type: non-profit industry peak body
- Headquarters: Sydney, Australia
- Location: Sydney, Australia
- Region served: Australia
- Services: professional directorship body
- Key people: Mark Rigotti (CEO)
- Staff: 300+ and 53,000+ Members
- Website: aicd.com.au

The Australian Institute of Company Directors (AICD) is a non-profit membership organization for directors. The AICD is a founding member of the Global Network of Director Institutes (GNDI).

== History ==
The origins of the AICD can be traced back to the United Kingdom's Institute of Directors (IoD), formed by royal charter in 1906. Branches of the IoD appeared in the Australian states in the 1960s. These branches were amalgamated in January 1971 under the Institute of Directors in Australia, an autonomous body affiliated with the IoD in the United Kingdom. The challenge of servicing state branches saw the emergence of the Company Directors Association of Australia in 1982. The two bodies merged on 1 January 1990 to form the Australian Institute of Company Directors.

In 2022, an AICD seminar on cybersecurity was crashed by hackers.

=== International associations ===
AICD is a founding member of the Global Director Development Circle, now known as the Global Network of Directors Institutes. GNDI is composed of member organizations for directors from Australia, the UK, the US, Canada, Malaysia, New Zealand, Brazil, and South Africa.

== Structure ==
AICD is a national organization with seven state and territory divisions and an international business unit. The board of directors consists of four national directors, seven divisional representatives and the MD and CEO. Angus Armor FAICD joined as managing director and chief executive officer in August 2017.

== Membership ==
There are six categories of membership:

- Affiliate (AAICD)
- Member (MAICD)
- Graduate member (GAICD)
- Fellow (FAICD) – List of Fellows of the Australian Institute of Company Directors
- Life fellow (FAICD(Life))
- International

== Education ==
AICD courses provide access to professional development opportunities for those interested in directorship and governance.

== Advocacy ==
In 2022, AICD announced it would support the Indigenous Voice to Parliament.

== Publications ==
AICD produces a range of publications on corporate governance and directorship, including freely available resources to support governance in nonprofit organisations.
