= List of Q+A panellists =

Q+A is an Australian television current affairs panel show, in which members of the Australian public question a panel of five public figures, usually including politicians, on a range of public interest topics. It is broadcast on two channels of the ABC Television network, and as of February 2024 hosted by journalist Patricia Karvelas.

== Hosts and description ==
Q+A was hosted by Stan Grant from 1 August 2022 until May 2023. Prior to 2020 the show was hosted by Tony Jones, then by journalist Hamish Macdonald until mid-2021, and then by a series of rotating hosts.

The program focuses mainly on politics, but also covers a range of other issues. Questions are submitted to the panel by the studio audience or via video question from ordinary members of the Australian public, and the program is broadcast live. Part of the aim is to "hold to account politicians and key opinion leaders in a national public forum". Tweets containing commentary from viewers are shown on screen throughout the discussion. There are usually five panellists, most often including at least two politicians from different parties, but occasionally there is a focus on something completely different, such as science, or the special editions from the Garma Festival, with a panel to suit the content.

== Season 1: 2008 ==
This was the first season of the program, comprising 20 episodes. The most any one person appeared in this series was twice. The first episode featured Prime Minister Kevin Rudd as the only guest, and was announced as a one-off special. However, on episode 19, Q&A again featured just one panellist, the new leader of the Liberal Party Malcolm Turnbull, who had won a leadership ballot just 9 days before.

Episode	Date	Panellists			
Episode	Date	Labor	Coalition	Minor Parties / Independents	Others
1	22 May 2008	Kevin Rudd			
2	29 May 2008	Tanya Plibersek	Tony Abbott	Bob Brown	Warren Mundine Louise Adler
3	5 June 2008	Tony Burke	Julie Bishop		Randa Abdel-Fattah; Stephen Mayne; Greg Sheridan
4	12 June 2008	Joel Fitzgibbon	George Brandis; Pru Goward		Kate Crawford; Charles Firth
5	19 June 2008	Chris Bowen	Christopher Pyne	Cheryl Kernot	Nick Adams; Julia Zemiro
6	26 June 2008	Bill Shorten	Greg Hunt		Elizabeth Ann Macgregor; Tim Blair; Angela Conway
7	3 July 2008	Nicola Roxon	Joe Hockey		Marcia Langton; Peter van Onselen; Miriam Lyons
8	10 July 2008	Craig Emerson	Helen Coonan	Christine Milne	Andrew Bolt; Linda Jaivin
9	17 July 2008	Lindsay Tanner	Alexander Downer		David Marr; Angela Shanahan; Rose Jackson
10	24 July 2008	Mark Arbib	Barnaby Joyce		Nick Xenophon; Heather Ridout; Christine Jackman
11	31 July 2008	Penny Wong	Malcolm Turnbull		Tim Flannery; Catherine Harris; Tim Wilson
12	7 August 2008	Peter Garrett	Bronwyn Bishop		Julian Morrow; Megan Davis; Imre Salusinszky
13	14 August 2008	Bob Carr	Julie Bishop		Germaine Greer; Greg Sheridan; Marcus Westbury
14	21 August 2008	Anthony Albanese	George Brandis		Blanche d'Alpuget; Cindy Pan; Grahame Morris
15	28 August 2008	Craig Emerson	Sharman Stone		John Pilger; Peter Hartcher; Rebecca Weisser
16	4 September 2008	Bill Shorten	Christopher Pyne; Kerry Chikarovski		Eric Beecher; Jane Caro
17	11 September 2008	Tanya Plibersek	Nick Minchin		Mungo MacCallum; Tim Wilson; Linda Jaivin
18	18 September 2008	Maxine McKew	Tony Abbott		Waleed Aly; Margaret Fitzherbert; Robert Manne
19	25 September 2008		Malcolm Turnbull		
20	2 October 2008	Nicola Roxon	Peter Costello	Cheryl Kernot	David Marr; Tom Switzer

== Season 2a: 2009 ==
This was the second season of the program, totalling 42 episodes. As with season one, no panellist appeared in this season more than twice. Episode 7 of this series was broadcast live from Melbourne, the first time the program was filmed outside its Ultimo studio in Sydney. Episode 14 was also broadcast from another location, this time from the National Museum of Australia in Canberra for an Australian federal budget special with the finance minister and shadow treasurer.

Episode	Date	Panellists				Topics
Episode	Date	Labor	Coalition	Minor Parties / Independents	Others	Topics
1	12 February 2009				Peter Cosgrove; Fiona Wood; Tania Major; Tim Flannery; Jonty Bush	Australians of the Year special
2	19 February 2009	Wayne Swan	Joe Hockey; Kate Carnell	Christine Milne	Paul Howes	The Economy
3	26 February 2009	Bill Shorten	Christopher Pyne		Jonathan Biggins; Leslie Cannold; Sabrina Houssami	
4	6 March 2009	Lindsay Tanner	Peter Costello		Geoff Cousins; Rebecca Weisser; Sally Warhaft	
5	12 March 2009	Maxine McKew	Scott Morrison		John Symond; Tanveer Ahmed; Noeline Brown	
6	19 March 2009	Kate Ellis	Tony Abbott		Peter Kennedy; Bettina Arndt; Bruce Wolpe	
7	26 March 2009	Stephen Conroy	Greg Hunt		Andrew Bolt; Louise Adler; Susan Carland	Melbourne broadcast
8	2 April 2009	Tanya Plibersek	George Brandis		Satyajit Das; Dennis Altman; Rachel Fry	
9	9 April 2009	Tony Burke	Helen Coonan; John Hewson		Jane Caro; Andrew Boe	
10	16 April 2009	Chris Bowen	Sophie Mirabella		Catherine Deveny; John Elliott; Stephen Crittenden	
11	23 April 2009	Craig Emerson	Julie Bishop		David Marr; Cindy Pan; P. J. O'Rourke	
12	30 April 2009	Peter Garrett	Barnaby Joyce; Pru Goward	Sarah Hanson-Young	Wesley Enoch	
13	7 May 2009	Mark Arbib	Sharman Stone		Guy Rundle; Greg Sheridan; Randa Abdel-Fattah	
14	14 May 2009	Lindsay Tanner	Joe Hockey		Geoff Cousins; Misha Schubert; Elizabeth Ann Macgregor	Budget special from Canberra
15	21 May 2009	Penny Wong	Tony Abbott		Bob Ellis; Sue Cato; Wendy Machin	
16	28 May 2009	Kate Ellis	Brendan Nelson		William McInnes; Peter Holmes à Court; Miriam Lyons	

== Season 2b: 2009 ==
The second half of season two of Q&A began on 23 July 2009. Episode 22 was broadcast from the Melbourne Writers Festival with three writers on the panel. Episode 26 was broadcast from Adelaide. Episode 27 had no politician on the panel.

Episode	Date	Panellists				Topics
Episode	Date	Labor	Coalition	Minor Parties / Independents	Others	Topics
17	23 July 2009	Nicola Roxon	Nick Minchin		Julian Morrow; Jessica Brown; Charlie Teo	
18	30 July 2009	Anna Bligh	George Brandis		David Penberthy; Tania Major; Simon Sheikh	
19	6 August 2009	Julia Gillard	Malcolm Turnbull		Sara Haghdoosti; Mitch Grady; Linden Brownley	Youth special
20	13 August 2009	Craig Emerson	Christopher Pyne		Sharan Burrow; Piers Akerman; Indira Naidoo	
21	20 August 2009	Maxine McKew	Tony Smith		Felicity Hampel; Anthony LaPaglia; Candy Bowers	
22	27 August 2009	Lindsay Tanner	Tony Abbott		Richard Flanagan; Kamila Shamsie; Tara June Winch	Melbourne Writers Festival special
23	3 September 2009	Tony Burke	Bill Heffernan		Helen Liddell; Tim Wilson; Anne Summers	
24	10 September 2009	Geoff Gallop	Sophie Mirabella		John Marsden; Anthony Ackroyd; Melinda Tankard Reist	
25	17 September 2009	Tanya Plibersek	Joe Hockey		Thomas Keneally; Larissa Behrendt; John Roskam	
26	24 September 2009	Kate Ellis	Alexander Downer	Natasha Stott Despoja	Peter Sutton; Megan Lloyd	Adelaide broadcast
27	1 October 2009				Christopher Hitchens; Waleed Aly; Frank Brennan; Anne Henderson; Sally Warhaft	Spirituality special
28	8 October 2009	Belinda Neal	Cory Bernardi		Germaine Greer; Todd Sampson; Janet Albrechtsen	
29	15 October 2009	Anthony Albanese	Christopher Pyne		Alexei Sayle; Deepa Gupta; Nikki Williams	
30	22 October 2009	Craig Emerson	Peter Dutton		Louise Adler; Annabel Crabb; John Elliott	
31	29 October 2009	Bill Shorten	Tony Abbott		Bettina Arndt; Catherine Deveny; Jonathan Biggins	
32	5 November 2009	Maxine McKew; Graham Richardson	Joe Hockey; Kerry Chikarovski		David Marr	

== Season 3: 2010 ==
The third season of Q&A began on 8 February 2010, and will be a full season consisting of 40 episodes on the new night, Monday, on ABC1. Episode 1 was broadcast from Old Parliament House, Canberra, with an audience of 16- to 25-year-olds. Episode 4 was broadcast from the Adelaide Festival of Arts, and had a total of 6 panellists making it the largest panel in the program's history. The following episode also had 6 panellists.

Episode 9 featured Opposition Leader Tony Abbott as the only panellist. Episode 12 was a 'politician-free' episode, where no current or former politicians were on the panel. Also in episode 12, a Twitter feed was introduced, where selected tweets discussing Q&A are shown on screen. Episode 18 featured six panellists and was broadcast from Casula in south west Sydney. On episode 24, Tanya Plibersek became the first panellist to appear on Q&A more than twice in one season (only if you consider 2009's programmes to be two seasons – both Tony Abbott and Joe Hockey appeared four times in the full year of 2009 with five other panellists appeared three times that year).

Episode 27 and 28 each featured the two leaders alone on the panel, in the final two episodes before the election. Episode 29 was the first episode following the election, and was controversial in that at the last minute Julia Gillard pulled Mark Arbib from appearing on the panel, and an empty chair was left on the panel for the entire episode. Episode 30 was broadcast from the Melbourne Writers Festival.

Episode 37 featured former Prime Minister John Howard as the only panellist, co-inciding with the launch of his memoirs, Lazarus Rising. Episode 38 was the first time the program was broadcast from Western Australia in Perth.

Nick Minchin was originally supposed to be the Coalition panellist on the season finale, but bad weather prohibited his plane from landing in Sydney on time. Minchin was replaced on the panel by George Brandis.

Episode	Date	Panellists				Topics
Episode	Date	Labor	Coalition	Minor Parties / Independents	Others	Topics
1	8 February 2010	Kevin Rudd				Prime Minister
2	15 February 2010	Lindsay Tanner	Barnaby Joyce		Satyajit Das; Melinda Tankard Reist; Rebecca Huntley	
3	22 February 2010	Tanya Plibersek	Malcolm Turnbull		Mungo MacCallum; John Roskam; Jane Caro	
4	1 March 2010	Peter Garrett	Christopher Pyne		Eddie Perfect; Paul Grabowsky; Jin Xing; Rhoda Roberts	Adelaide Festival special
5	8 March 2010	Tony Burke	Julie Bishop		Patrick McGorry; Richard Dawkins; Steve Fielding; Jacqueline Ninio; ~~Veronica Brady~~	
6	15 March 2010	Bill Shorten	Peter Dutton		Miranda Devine; Catherine Deveny; Waleed Aly	
7	22 March 2010	Nicola Roxon	Greg Hunt		John Doyle; Valerie Amos; Tim Wilson	
8	29 March 2010	Craig Emerson; Graham Richardson	Kelly O'Dwyer	Nick McKim	Sue Cato	
9	5 April 2010		Tony Abbott			Leader of the Opposition
10	12 April 2010	Tanya Plibersek	Joe Hockey		Jeffrey L. Bleich; Lucy Turnbull; Greg Sheridan	
11	19 April 2010	Bob Carr	Scott Morrison		Heather Ridout; Simon Sheikh; Shimrit Nothman	
12	26 April 2010				Germaine Greer; Peter Cosgrove; Peter FitzSimons; Henry Reynolds; Alison Creagh	ANZAC Day special
13	3 May 2010	Penny Wong	Nick Minchin	Christine Milne	John Symond; Paul Howes	
14	10 May 2010	Brendan O'Connor	Sophie Mirabella		Kaiser Kuo; Helen Razer; Brett Solomon	
15	17 May 2010	Lindsay Tanner	Joe Hockey			Budget special
16	24 May 2010				Malcolm Fraser; Peter Carey; Lionel Shriver; John Ralston Saul; Marcia Langton	Authors special
17	31 May 2010	Maxine McKew	Cory Bernardi		Miriam Lyons; Clare Bowditch; Mitchell Grady	
18	7 June 2010	Chris Bowen	Scott Morrison; Pru Goward		Kevin Sheedy; Samah Hadid; Heath Ducker	Casula broadcast
19	14 June 2010	Peter Garrett	Helen Coonan		David Marr; Peter Singer; Jayashri Kulkarni	
20	21 June 2010	Craig Emerson; Graham Richardson	Malcolm Turnbull	Sarah Hanson-Young	Jessica Brown	
21	28 June 2010	Bill Shorten	Barnaby Joyce		Magda Szubanski; Harold Mitchell; Janet Albrechtsen; Christine Wallace	The Gillard Coup
22	5 July 2010	Tony Burke	George Brandis	Cheryl Kernot	Annabel Crabb; Grahame Morris	
23	12 July 2010	Chris Evans	Christopher Pyne	Scott Ludlam	John Elliott; Felicity Hampel; Lenore Taylor	
24	19 July 2010	Tanya Plibersek	Julie Bishop		Piers Akerman; Waleed Aly; Bruce Hawker	
25	26 July 2010	Penny Wong; Graham Richardson	Malcolm Turnbull	Christine Milne	Tom Switzer	
26	2 August 2010	Craig Emerson	Peter Dutton; Barnaby Joyce	Larissa Waters	Madonna King	Brisbane broadcast
27	9 August 2010	Julia Gillard				Prime Minister
28	12 August 2010	Tony Burke	Scott Morrison	Bob Brown	Suvendrini Perera; John Elliott	Population special
29	16 August 2010		Tony Abbott			Casula broadcast
30	23 August 2010	~~Mark Arbib~~; Graham Richardson	Malcolm Turnbull	Sarah Hanson-Young; Tony Windsor	Janet Albrechtsen	
31	30 August 2010				Malcolm Fraser; Jessica Rudd; John Keane; Christine Wallace; Chris Berg	Melbourne Writers Festival special
32	6 September 2010	Peter Beattie	Nick Minchin	Bob Katter; Christine Milne	Rebecca Huntley	
33	13 September 2010	Tanya Plibersek	Warren Truss	Sarah Hanson-Young	Clive Palmer; Lenore Taylor	
34	20 September 2010	Chris Bowen	Christopher Pyne		Craig Reucassel; Helen McCabe; Leslie Cannold	
35	27 September 2010	Stephen Conroy	Sophie Mirabella	Rob Oakeshott; Fiona Patten	Mungo MacCallum	
36	4 October 2010				Tariq Ali; Geoffrey Robertson; Lenore Skenazy; Ratih Hardjono; Paul Kelly	Festival of Dangerous Ideas special (Sydney Opera House)
37	11 October 2010	Mark Arbib	Kelly O'Dwyer		Roy Masters; Geoff Lawson; Lisa Forrest	Sports special
38	18 October 2010	Mike Kelly	Greg Hunt		Tim Flannery; Jennifer Marohasy; Bruce Guthrie; Jennifer Hewett	
39	25 October 2010		John Howard			Former Prime Minister
40	1 November 2010	Stephen Smith	Julie Bishop; Colin Barnett	Rachel Siewert	Andrew Forrest; Tony Wiltshire	Perth broadcast
41	9 November 2010	Bill Shorten	~~Nick Minchin~~; George Brandis		Janet Albrechtsen; Jonathan Biggins; Randa Abdel-Fattah	

== Season 4: 2011 ==
The fourth season of Q&A began on 7 February 2011, continuing in its Monday night timeslot. The exceptions to this were the twelfth and twenty-third episodes, which aired on Thursday 28 April and 7 July respectively. The first special was a special discussion preceding the Wedding of Prince William and Catherine Middleton, which the second special was entitled "Stopping The Boats" and was centred on the topic of asylum seekers. During this season, Christopher Pyne was the first panellist to appear ten times since Season One, and Lachlan Harris was the 250th unique panellist since Season One.

Episode	Date	Panellists				Topics
Episode	Date	Labor	Coalition	Minor Parties / Independents	Others	Topics
1	7 February 2011	Graham Richardson	Amanda Vanstone		Catherine Deveny; Gerard Henderson; David Williamson	
2	14 February 2011	Craig Emerson	Helen Coonan		Lydia Khalil; John Pilger; Greg Sheridan	
3	21 February 2011	Anna Bligh	Barnaby Joyce		Tim Flannery; Gina Castelain; Ian Nelson	Brisbane broadcast
4	28 February 2011	Bill Shorten	Malcolm Turnbull		Piers Akerman; Gretel Killeen; Samah Hadid	
5	7 March 2011	Kate Ellis	Joe Hockey		Gail Kelly; Janet Albrechtsen; Mike Carlton	
6	14 March 2011	Julia Gillard				Prime Minister
7	21 March 2011	Jason Clare	Christopher Pyne	Christine Milne	Miranda Devine; Lachlan Harris	
8	28 March 2011	Tanya Plibersek; John Della Bosca	Concetta Fierravanti-Wells		Julian Morrow; Grahame Morris	
9	4 April 2011	Kevin Rudd	Julie Bishop		Jeffrey L. Bleich; Louise Adler; Robert Manne	
10	11 April 2011	Penny Wong	Greg Hunt		Bess Price; Graeme Innes; Chris Kenny	
11	25 April 2011				Matina Jewell; Jim Molan; Eva Cox; Neil James; Najeeba Wazefadost	ANZAC Day special
12	28 April 2011	Bob Carr	Amanda Vanstone; Nick Minchin		Craig Reucassel; Marcia Langton; Angela Bishop	Royal Wedding special
13	2 May 2011	Simon Crean	Sophie Mirabella	Tony Windsor	Eliza Brown; Nick Klomp; Alana Johnson	Albury broadcast
14	9 May 2011	Lindsay Tanner	Malcolm Turnbull		Lydia Khallil; Christine Wallace; Nazeem Hussain	
15	16 May 2011	Bill Shorten	Eric Abetz		Anna Rose; Felicity Hampel; John Roskam	
16	23 May 2011				Howard Jacobson; Brendan Cowell; Michael Cunningham; Gail Dines; Leslie Cannold	Sydney Writers' Festival special
17	30 May 2011	Kate Lundy	George Brandis; Jackie Kelly		Guy Rundle; Joe Hildebrand	
18	6 June 2011	Nicola Roxon	Christopher Pyne	Lee Rhiannon	Sandy Gutman; Paul McGeough	
19	13 June 2011	Peter Garrett	Concetta Fierravanti-Wells	Bob Katter	Mike Carlton; Natalie Pa'apa'a	
20	20 June 2011				Josh Thomas; Samah Hadid; James Paterson; Ruslan Kogan; Faustina Agolley	'Gen Y' special
21	27 June 2011	Anthony Albanese	Joe Hockey	Adam Bandt	Judith Sloan; Fiona Katauskas	
22	4 July 2011	Penny Wong	Mathias Cormann; Stephen O'Doherty		Charles Waterstreet; Elizabeth Ann Macgregor; ~~John Hewson~~	Colonialism; Carbon Tax; Sexism; Gay Marriage; Foreign Ownership; Cattle Ban; Mental Illness
23	7 July 2011	Chris Bowen	Scott Morrison	Sarah Hanson-Young	David Marr; Piers Akerman; Najeeba Wazefadost	Asylum Seekers
24	11 July 2011	Julia Gillard				Mandate? Climate Change; Taxation; Political Vision
25	18 July 2011				John Lennox; Susan Carland; John Safran; Eva Cox; Jacqueline Grey; ~~Arwa El Masri~~	Spirituality Special; Phone Hacking; Carbon Tax; Atheism; The Burqa
26	25 July 2011	Lara Giddings	Eric Abetz	Christine Milne	Peter Cundall; Garry Bailey; Melanie Kerrison	Hobart broadcast
27	1 August 2011	Tanya Plibersek	Peter Dutton		Stephen Mayne; Brendan O'Neill; Heather Ridout; Christine Nixon	Labor; Attacks in Norway; Murdoch; Tony Abbott; Carbon Tax; Ethics
28	8 August 2011	Mark Dreyfus	Kelly O'Dwyer		Graham Richardson; Noni Hazlehurst; Tom Switzer	Global Financial Crisis; Tony Abbott; Labor; Sexism; Malcolm Turnbull; Asylum Seekers; Ethics
29	15 August 2011	Tony Burke	Malcolm Turnbull; Jackie Kelly		Lachlan Harris; Deborah Cheetham; Stella Young	NDIS; Homophobia; Mining exploration Fracking; The economy London riots
30	22 August 2011	Doug Cameron	Nick Minchin		Daniel Pipes; Hanifa Deen; Suelette Dreyfus	Craig Thompson; Arab Spring; USA; Manufacturing; Wikileaks
31	29 August 2011				Don Watson; Kate Grenville; Anna Funder; Malalai Joya; Omar Musa	Melbourne Writers Festival Special
32	5 September 2011	Greg Combet	Sophie Mirabella		Clive Palmer; Paul Howes; Jessica Irvine	Asylum Seekers; Kevin Rudd's demotion Carbon Tax; Manufacturing; Industrial Relations
33	12 September 2011		Barnaby Joyce		Germaine Greer; Paul Barry; Melinda Tankard Reist; Joe Hildebrand	Julia Gillard; Sexism; Kevin Rudd; September 11 response Media ownership Feminism
34	19 September 2011	Kristina Keneally			Raimond Gaita; Cristina Rad; Jim Wallace; Gerard Henderson	Spirituality; Asylum seekers Euthanasia; Homophobia
35	26 September 2011	Mark Butler	Helen Coonan	Rob Oakeshott	William McInnes; Janet Albrechtsen	Julia Gillard; Kevin Rudd; Mental health Pokies; Global Financial Crisis; Democracy
36	3 October 2011				Kate Adie; Greg Sheridan; Mona Eltahawy; Jon Ronson; Slavoj Zizek	Festival of Dangerous Ideas special
37	10 October 2011	Bill Shorten	Julie Bishop		Richard Flanagan; Ron Merkel; Caroline Overington	Kevin Rudd; Asylum seekers Andrew Bolt; Taxation; Steve Jobs
38	17 October 2011	Paul Henderson	Dave Tollner		Rosalie Kunoth-Monks; Fiona O'Loughlin; Stuart Blanch; Luke Bowen	Darwin broadcast
39	24 October 2011	Tanya Plibersek	Christopher Pyne		Judith Sloan; Kate Miller-Heidke; Graham Richardson	Gender equality Gaddafi's death Occupy movement Kevin Rudd; Gay Marriage; Society
40	31 October 2011				Richard Gill; Anne Summers; Tanveer Ahmed; Alan Asher; Rebecca Weisser	Industrial Relations; Afghanistan; Asylum seekers Music education
41	7 November 2011	Kate Ellis	Malcolm Turnbull		Jessica Rudd; Ray Martin; Peter Reith	Phone hacking Celebrity; Industrial Relations; Kevin Rudd; Climate Change; Steve Jobs

== Season 5: 2012 ==
The fifth season of Q&A began on 6 February 2012.

Episode	Date	Panellists				Topics
Episode	Date	Labor	Coalition	Minor Parties / Independents	Others	Topics
1	6 February 2012	Penny Wong	Joe Hockey		Judith Sloan; Miriam Lyons; Joe Hildebrand	Who has been the best PM; ALP leadership Economy; Bank jobs Global wages Mothers
2	13 February 2012	Jenny McAllister	Helen Kroger		Mikey Robins; Robert Manne; Tim Wilson	Celebrities; Private health rebates Kevin Rudd; Peter Slipper; Banks
3	20 February 2012	Bill Shorten	Julie Bishop		Daniel Hannan; Eva Cox; Annabel Crabb	Kevin Rudd; ALP leadership Europe; Manufacturing jobs National Disability Insurance Scheme
4	27 February 2012	Chris Evans; Peter Beattie	Barnaby Joyce	Christine Milne	Lachlan Harris; Janet Albrechtsen	Gillard vs Rudd; Labor instability Primary elections Media role Abbott vs Turnbull
5	5 March 2012 (in Adelaide)		Amanda Vanstone	Natasha Stott Despoja	Mark Steyn; Jianying Zha; Paul Grabowsky	Clive Palmer; Ruthless individualism Wayne Swan's union influences Bob Carr; Misogyny in Australian politics Gay marriage Discrimination
6	12 March 2012	Tanya Plibersek	Malcolm Turnbull		Michael O'Brien; Mick Gooda; Clementine Ford	Gays; Climate change Kony; Aboriginals; Mining jobs Asylum seekers
7	19 March 2012				Germaine Greer; Toby Ralph; Benjamin Law; Christa Hughes; Craig Gross	Shallowness of political debate Advice for Julia Gillard; Racism; Porn; Afghanistan
8	26 March 2012	Craig Emerson	George Brandis	Larissa Waters	Grahame Morris; Liberty Sanger	Queensland election Automotive industry Clive Palmer & the CIA
9	2 April 2012 (in Hobart)	Julie Collins	Eric Abetz	Andrew Wilkie	Brian Ritchie; Natasha Cica; Terry Edwards	MONA; Andrew Wilkie's support of the government Forestry; Qualifications for politicians
10	9 April 2012				George Pell; Richard Dawkins	Religion & atheism
11	16 April 2012	Nicola Roxon	Christopher Pyne		A. C. Grayling; Geoffrey Robertson; Lydia Khalil	Julian Assange; Craig Thomson; Plain cigarette packaging Religion; ASIO monitoring protestors Iran/Israel
12	23 April 2012			Bob Brown		Bob Brown's retirement The Greens
13	26 April 2012 (special Thursday show)				Clive Palmer; Rebecca Huntley; Nick Minchin; Anna Rose; Megan Clark	Climate change
14	30 April 2012 (in Dandenong)	Mark Dreyfus	Sophie Mirabella		Victor Victor; Ged Kearney; Peter Reith; Diana Nguyen	Dandenong; Racism; Manufacturing
15	7 May 2012	Mark Butler	Kelly O'Dwyer		Mark Bouris; Kate Miller-Heidke; Graham Richardson	The Labor party Union corruption Carbon tax Aged card & mental health Banks
16	14 May 2012	Penny Wong	Joe Hockey		Tim Costello; Judith Sloan; Stephen Mayne	Craig Thomson; Bill Shorten; Egalitarianism; Working mothers Budget; Hockey & Abbott economic credentials Foreign aid Gay parents
17	21 May 2012				Jeffrey Eugenides; Kathy Lette; Glenn Carle; Masha Gessen; Greg Sheridan	Marriage; Julian Assange; Torture; Craig Thomson; Russia; Arts & humanities
18	28 May 2012				Barry Humphries; Miriam Margolyes; Jacki Weaver; John Hewson; David Marr	Foreign workers Expat view of Australian politics Craig Thomson; Speaking out Women in wealth and power Meaning of 'Un-Australian'; Dame Edna
19	4 June 2012 (in Toowoomba)	Simon Crean	Barnaby Joyce	Christine Milne	Georgie Somerset; Jeremy Marou	Royalties to regions Aid distribution Foreign investment Foreign workers Mining; Same sex marriage Queensland "gay panic" laws Native title Toowoomba range bypass
20	11 June 2012	Julia Gillard				
21	18 June 2012		Pru Goward		Lenny Henry; Brian Schmidt; Susan Ryan; Joe Hildebrand	Racism; Age discrimination Science and space Creation; Growth vs sustainability
22	25 June 2012	Kate Lundy	George Brandis		Tim Freedman; John Lee; Louise Adler	Media; Asylum seekers China; London Olympics
23	2 July 2012	Greg Combet	Sophie Mirabella		Simon Sheikh; Lenore Taylor; Grahame Morris	Carbon tax Parental leave Peter Slipper and media Asylum seekers and racism
24	9 July 2012	Chris Bowen	Malcolm Turnbull		Nahji Chu; Thierry de Duve; Elizabeth Ann Macgregor	
25	16 July 2012	Joel Fitzgibbon	Greg Hunt	Sarah Hanson-Young	Richard Ford; Jennifer Hewett; Peter Craven	
26	23 July 2012	Nicola Roxon	Christopher Pyne		Simon Sheikh; Michael Spence; Jane Caro	
26	30 July 2012	John Alexander			Shane Gould; Louise Sauvage; David Pocock; Michael O'Loughlin	
27	6 August 2012	Craig Emerson	George Brandis	Bob Katter	Debbie Kilroy; Katie Noonan	
28	13 August 2012	Mark Butler	Pru Goward		Peter Singer; Phillip Blond; Cassandra Goldie	
29	20 August 2012	Doug Cameron	Simon Birmingham		Graham Richardson; Janet Albrechtsen; Mandy Nolan	
30	27 August 2012				Simon Callow; Germaine Greer; Kwame Anthony Appiah; Sefi Atta	Melbourne Writers Festival special
31	3 September 2012	Tony Burke	Fiona Nash		Angry Anderson; Nitin Sawhney; Tara Moss	
33	10 September 2012	Chris Evans	Concetta Fierravanti-Wells		Peter Jensen; Anna Krien; Catherine Deveny	
34	17 September 2012			Clover Moore	Robyn Davidson; Ilan Pappé; Irving Wallach; Greg Sheridan	
35	24 September 2012	Tanya Plibersek	Kelly O'Dwyer		Mark Carnegie; Elliot Perlman; Jason Silva	
36	1 October 2012				Jane Bussmann; Shiv Malik; Jianying Zha; Simon Laham; Jesse Bering	Festival of Dangerous Ideas special
37	8 October 2012	Kate Ellis Lindsay Tanner	Christopher Pyne		Nilaja Sun; Piers Akerman	
38	15 October 2012	Bill Shorten	Sophie Mirabella		Pamela Stephenson; Charlie Pickering; Catherine Fox	
39	22 October 2012	Peter Garrett	Scott Morrison Amanda Vanstone		Billy Bragg; Julia Baird	
40	29 October 2012	Kate Lundy	Eric Abetz		Archie Roach; Sekai Holland; Grahame Morris	
41	5 November 2012	Alannah MacTiernan	Colin Barnett	Bob Brown	Hannah McGlade; Bob Cronin	Perth broadcast
42	19 November 2012	Kevin Rudd	Malcolm Turnbull		Judith Sloan; Heather Ridout	
43	26 November 2012	Penny Wong	Barnaby Joyce		Janet Albrechtsen; Stella Young; Jonathan Biggins	

== Season 6: 2013 ==
This season was the first to feature international broadcasts, with the show travelling to Jakarta and India. The 11 November show featured the 500th unique panellist to appear on the show. If you count it in order of introduction, Graham Bradley was the 500th.

Episode	Date	Panellists				Topics
Episode	Date	Labor	Coalition	Minor Parties / Independents	Others	Topics
1	4 February 2013	David Bradbury	Christopher Pyne Amanda Vanstone		Anne Summers; Tim Levinson	
2	11 February 2013	Chris Evans	George Brandis		Rachel Botsman; James Paterson; Corinne Grant	
3	18 February 2013	Tanya Plibersek	Greg Hunt		Cindy Pan; John Dickson; Lawrence M. Krauss	
4	25 February 2013	Bob Carr	Malcolm Turnbull		Eva Cox; Ahdaf Soueif; Jeffrey L. Bleich	
5	4 March 2013	Bill Shorten	Julie Bishop	Christine Milne	Tim Ferguson; Ruslan Kogan	
6	11 March 2013	Peter Garrett	Christopher Pyne			Education ministers
7	18 March 2013	David Feeney; Alannah MacTiernan	Barnaby Joyce		Viv Benjamin; Jeremy Cordeaux	
8	25 March 2013	Brendan O'Connor	Kelly O'Dwyer		A. C. Grayling; Christine Nixon; Brendon Gale; George Megalogenis	Werribee broadcast
9	1 April 2013				Archbishop Mark Coleridge; Mohamad Abdalla; Venerable Robina Courtin; Josh Thomas; Deborah Conway	Religion special
10	8 April 2013				Brooke Magnanti; Germaine Greer; Mia Freedman; Deborah Cheetham; Janet Albrechtsen	
11	15 April 2013	Dick Adams	Sophie Mirabella	Peter Whish-Wilson	Jan Davis; David Marr	Launceston broadcast
12	22 April 2013	Tanya Plibersek	Peter Dutton			Health ministers
13	29 April 2013	Mark Butler	Jamie Briggs	Sarah Hanson-Young	Andrea Mason; Nick Cater	Adelaide broadcast
14	6 May 2013	Julia Gillard				Schools special
15	13 May 2013			Larissa Waters; Bob Katter	Clive Palmer; Ged Kearney; Tim Nicholls	Brisbane broadcast
16	20 May 2013				Ruby Wax; Sylvia Nasar; Mike Carlton; Faramerz Dabhoiwala; William Dalrymple	Sydney Writers' Festival special
17	27 May 2013	Susan Ryan	Amanda Vanstone	Fred Nile	Gene Robinson; Lawrence Krauss	
18	28 May 2013				Bill Gates	
19	3 June 2013	Linda Burney	Cory Bernardi		Bill McKibben; Michael Stutchbury	
20	10 June 2013	Craig Emerson	Malcolm Turnbull		Haifaa al-Mansour; Jennifer Hewett; Mark Latham	
21	17 June 2013	Kate Lundy	Barnaby Joyce		Fiona Stanley; Paul Kelly; Robert Manne	
22	24 June 2013	Matt Thistlethwaite	George Brandis		Graham Richardson; Anne Summers; Judith Sloan	
23	1 July 2013	Tanya Plibersek	Sophie Mirabella		Sue Cato; Neil Lawrence; Todd Sampson	
24	4 July 2013				Dewi Fortuna Anwar; Tim Lindsey; Yuli Ismartono; Rafendi Djamin; Yenny Wahid; Meidyatama "Dimas" Suryodiningrat	Jakarta special
25	8 July 2013	Anthony Albanese	Malcolm Turnbull		Bill Leak; Corinne Grant; Miriam Lyons	
26	15 July 2013	Stephen Smith	Julie Bishop	Scott Ludlam	Mitch Hooke; Narelda Jacobs	Perth broadcast
27	22 July 2013	Bill Shorten	Arthur Sinodinos Tim Fischer		Louise Adler; Michelle Foster	
28	29 July 2013	Kate Ellis	Josh Frydenberg		Shahzad Akbar; Magda Szubanski; Peter Shergold	
29	5 August 2013	Doug Cameron	Greg Hunt		Yassmin Abdel-Magied; Pamela Williams; Grahame Morris	
30	12 August 2013	Penny Wong	Christopher Pyne	Adam Bandt	Janet Albrechtsen; Rhys Muldoon	
31	19 August 2013	Chris Bowen	Joe Hockey			Treasurers special
32	26 August 2013	Bill Shorten	Kelly O'Dwyer		Tom Watson; Sally Warhaft; Tim Wilson	Melbourne broadcast
33	2 September 2013	Kevin Rudd				
34	9 September 2013	Tanya Plibersek	George Brandis		Michael Kroger; Lenore Taylor; Graham Richardson	
35	16 September 2013			Larissa Waters Nick Xenophon	Rebecca Huntley; Mark Latham; Clive Palmer; David Williamson	
36	23 September 2013	David Suzuki				
37	30 September 2013	Bill Shorten; Anthony Albanese				ALP Leadership special (Perth)
38	7 October 2013	Kate Ellis	Greg Hunt		Viv Benjamin; Luo Xiaopeng; Greg Sheridan	
39	14 October 2013	Penny Wong	Arthur Sinodinos		Lally Katz; Jeff McMullen; Warren Mundine	
40	21 October 2013	Tony Burke	Barnaby Joyce Amanda Vanstone		Rabia Siddique; Vince Sorrenti	
41	28 October 2013	Joel Fitzgibbon	Christopher Pyne		Ray Martin; Judith Sloan; Wendy Harmer	
42	4 November 2013				Hanna Rosin; Peter Hitchens; Dan Savage; Germaine Greer	Festival of Dangerous Ideas special (Sydney Opera House)
43	11 November 2013				David Knox; John Symond; Carol Schwartz; Elizabeth Proust; Graham Bradley	Business special
44	18 November 2013				Shashi Tharoo; Swapan Dasgupta; Karan Thapar; Pallavi Sharda; Shoma Chaudhury; Stuart MacGill	India special
45	25 November 2013	Chris Bowen	Josh Frydenberg		Yulia Supadmo; Kurt Campbell; Julian Burnside; Tara Moss	

== Season 7: 2014 ==
On 29 September, Christopher Pyne became the first panellist to appear 20 times since Season One. On 7 April, the show travelled to Shanghai and on 4 August the first outdoor show was conducted in Arnhem Land at the Garma Festival.

Episode	Date	Panellists				Topics
Episode	Date	Labor	Coalition	Minor Parties / Independents	Others	Topics
1	3 February 2014	Tanya Plibersek	Barnaby Joyce		Akmal Saleh; Cassandra Goldie; Nick Cater; Ray Martin	
2	10 February 2014	Mark Dreyfus	Malcolm Turnbull		Dave Hughes; Yolanda Vega; Janet Albrechtsen	
3	17 February 2014	Tony Burke	Eric Abetz		Heather Ridout; Yassmin Abdel-Magied; James Allan	
4	20 February 2014				Christine Lagarde	
5	24 February 2014	Anthony Albanese	Jamie Briggs	Clive Palmer	Rhonda Cornum; Ged Kearney	
6	3 March 2014	Jason Clare	Josh Frydenberg		Sue Morphet; Katharine Viner; David Bridie	
7	10 March 2014	Chris Bowen	George Brandis		Sharri Markson; Lisa Wilkinson; Marcia Langton	
8	17 March 2014	Mark Butler	Sussan Ley		Miroslav Volf; Billy Bragg; Wendy Harmer	
9	24 March 2014	Richard Marles	Kelly O'Dwyer		Rachel Griffiths; Eddie McGuire; Lindsay Fox	Melbourne broadcast
10	31 March 2014				Lucy Siegle; Ilwad Elman; Tim Wilson; Kenneth Roth; Mona Eltahawy	Human Rights special
11	7 April 2014				Guo Jian; Mei Yan; Ma Tianjie; Cheng Lei; Geoff Raby	Shanghai special
12	14 April 2014	Marise Payne	Penny Wong	Jacqui Lambie	Michelle Garnaut; Judith Sloan	
13	21 April 2014	Bob Carr	Kerry Chikarovski		Brendan O'Neill; Nigel Kennedy; Eva Cox	
14	28 April 2014	Doug Cameron	Malcolm Turnbull		Sarrah Le Marquand; Andrew Neil; Van Badham	
15	5 May 2014	Anna Burke	Christopher Pyne		Mark Trevorrow; Pallavi Sinha; John Roskam	
16	12 May 2014	Alannah MacTiernan	Sharman Stone		Innes Willox; Satyajit Das; David Marr	
17	19 May 2014		Joe Hockey			Post-budget special in Penrith
18	26 May 2014				Tim Storrier; Richard Flanagan; Jean Kittson; Tara Moss; ~~Kate Ceberano~~; Thomas Keneally	Sydney Writers Festival special
19	2 June 2014	Catherine King	Cory Bernardi		Lawrence M. Krauss; Lucy Turnbull; Rowan Dean	
20	9 June 2014				Jane Goodall; Betty Churcher; Rosalie Kunoth-Monks; Peter Coleman; Stuart Rees	Elders special
21	16 June 2014	Ed Husic	Josh Frydenberg		Virisila Buadromo; Dee Madigan; James Allan	
22	23 June 2014				Mark Carnegie; Tony Shepherd; Holly Ransom; Mark Latham; Eva Cox	Big policy ideas special
23	30 June 2014	Richard Marles	Sarah Henderson; Darryn Lyons	Richard Di Natale	Elaine Carbines	Geelong broadcast
24	7 July 2014				Joseph Stiglitz; Christine Wong; Ross Garnaut; Judith Sloan	Economics special
25	14 July 2014	Tanya Plibersek	Philip Ruddock		Charlie Pickering; Tania Major; Timothy Hawkes	
26	21 July 2014				Michael Kirby; Nafsiah Mboi; Françoise Barré-Sinoussi; Amanda Vanstone; Nic Holas	AIDS Conference special Melbourne broadcast
27	28 July 2014	Mark Butler	Barnaby Joyce		David Suchet; Louise Adler; Madonna King	
28	4 August 2014	Nova Peris	Ken Wyatt		Djawa Yunupingu; Dhäŋggal Gurruwiwi; Joe Morrison; Noel Pearson	Arnhem Land broadcast
29	11 August 2014	Greg Combet	Sussan Ley		Jennifer Robinson; John Stackhouse; Simon Breheny	
30	18 August 2014	Penny Wong	Warren Truss	Clive Palmer	Heather Ridout; John Falzon	
31	25 August 2014	Gareth Evans			Paul Kelly; Elizabeth Pisani; Tasneem Chopra; Ali Alizadeh	Melbourne Writers Festival special
32	1 September 2014				Kay Hymowitz; Lydia Cacho; Jane Caro; Kajsa Ekis Ekman; Alissa Nutting	Festival of Dangerous Ideas special (Sydney Opera House)
33	8 September 2014	Sam Dastyari	Concetta Fierravanti-Wells		~~Jimmy Barnes~~; Jonathan Biggins; Kate McClymont; Kim Williams	
34	15 September 2014				Marita Cheng; Brian Schmidt; Peter C. Doherty; Suzanne Cory; Ian Chubb	Science special
35	22 September 2014	Mark Dreyfus	Michael Keenan	Scott Ludlam	Randa Abdel-Fattah; Anne Aly	Islamic Extremists special
36	29 September 2014	Wayne Swan	Christopher Pyne		Tony Barry; Kate Carnell; Laura Tingle	
37	6 October 2014			Bob Katter	Josh Thomas; Patrick McGorry; Jennifer Bowers; Louise Byrnes	Mental Health special Rockhampton broadcast
38	13 October 2014	Kate Ellis	Kelly O'Dwyer		Julian Burnside; Greg Sheridan; Cate McGregor	
39	20 October 2014				Brian Cox; 360 (Matt Colwell); Richard Gill; Nalini Joshi; Miranda Tapsell	
40	27 October 2014	Catherine King	Stuart Robert		Geoffrey Robertson; ~~Jenny Hocking~~; Rowan Dean	
41	3 November 2014		George Brandis			Bankstown broadcast
42	10 November 2014	Anthony Albanese	Greg Hunt		Baroness Greenfield; Laura John; James Paterson	
43	17 November 2014	Tanya Plibersek	Malcolm Turnbull		Ben Elton; Sarrah Le Marquand; Jonathan Holmes	
44	24 November 2014		Amanda Vanstone		Noel Pearson; James Cromwell; Holly Ransom; Waleed Aly	

== Season 8: 2015 ==
On 16 February, Malcolm Turnbull became the first guest to appear 21 times on the show. To celebrate International Women's Day a special episode of Q&A was held, hosted by Annabel Crabb and featuring an all-female panel. Virginia Trioli guest hosted the program twice, on 27 July and 24 August.

Episode	Date	Panellists				Topics
Episode	Date	Labor	Coalition	Minor Parties / Independents	Others	Topics
1	2 February 2015	Wayne Swan	Barnaby Joyce	Jacqui Lambie; Larissa Waters; John Madigan		
2	9 February 2015	Chris Bowen	Jamie Briggs		Alan Jones; Corinne Grant; Heather Ridout	
3	16 February 2015	Catherine King	Malcolm Turnbull		Lisa Wilkinson; Bryan Stevenson; Greg Sheridan	
4	23 February 2015			Natasha Stott Despoja	Rosie Batty; Tim Cartwright; Charlie King; Simon Santosha	Domestic violence
5	2 March 2015	Andrew Leigh	Josh Frydenberg		Miriam Margolyes; Trisha Jha; Jamila Rizvi	
6	9 March 2015		Julie Bishop		Germaine Greer; Roxane Gay; Holly Kramer; Yassmin Abdel-Magied	Feminism special
7	16 March 2015	Chris Bowen	Joe Hockey		Cassandra Goldie; Kate Carnell; John Daley (economist CEO Grattan Institute)	
8	23 March 2015	Joel Fitzgibbon	Fiona Nash		Troy Cassar-Daley; Robyn Clubb; Rob Cook	
9	30 March 2015	Penny Wong	Christopher Pyne		Brian Schmidt; Ruby Wax; Michael Franti	
10	6 April 2015	Ed Husic	Kelly O'Dwyer		Nana Mouskouri; Michael Stutchbury; Van Badham	
11	13 April 2015	Alannah MacTiernan	Mitch Fifield		Peter Greste; Malarndirri McCarthy; Su McCluskey	
12	20 April 2015	Anna Burke	Andrew Robb		Derryn Hinch; Dave Hughes; Jane Burns	
13	27 April 2015	Tanya Plibersek	Arthur Sinodinos Tim Fischer		Carolyn Holbrook; Tom Porteous	
14	4 May 2015	Mark Butler	Greg Hunt Amanda Vanstone		Peter Singer; Adrienne Truscott	
15	11 May 2015	Jason Clare	Christian Porter	Clive Palmer	Nakkiah Lui; Jennifer Hewett	
16	18 May 2015				Norman Doidge; Caitlin Doughty; Douglas Coupland; Mohsin Hamid; Christina Lamb	
17	25 May 2015		Joe Hockey			Budget special
18	1 June 2015	Anthony Albanese	Josh Frydenberg		Jack Charles; Miriam Lyons; Judith Sloan	
19	8 June 2015	Katy Gallagher	Christine Forster; Philip Ruddock		Cornel West; Bates Gill	
20	15 June 2015		Bronwyn Bishop		Luca Belgiorno-Nettis; Noel Pearson; Gillian Triggs; Bret Walker	Magna Carta 800th anniversary special
21	18 June 2015			Fred Nile	Dennis Altman; Paul Capsis; Julie McCrossin; Julia Doulman; Katherine Hudson	LGBT special (Between a Frock and a Hard Place); Hosted by Tom Ballard
22	22 June 2015	Joel Fitzgibbon	Steven Ciobo		Linda Tirado; Dee Madigan; Grahame Morris; Antony Hegarty	
23	29 June 2015	Tanya Plibersek	~~Alan Tudge~~		~~Nick Cater~~; Tim Wilson; Anne Aly; Lawrence M. Krauss; Paul Kelly	
24	6 July 2015	Richard Marles	~~Barnaby Joyce~~	Larissa Waters	Vrasidas Karalis; Trisha Jha; Greg Sheridan	
25	13 July 2015	Amanda Rishworth	~~Malcolm Turnbull~~; John Hewson		John G. Stackhouse, Jr. Michael Ware; Alex Oliver	
26	20 July 2015	Mark Butler	Tim Fischer	Jacqui Lambie	Katherine Teh-White; Alan Jones	
27	27 July 2015	Annastacia Palaszczuk	Ron Boswell		Mark Coleridge; Anne Tiernan; Monica Bradley	
28	3 August 2015				Ranjana Srivastava; Neil deGrasse Tyson; Beth Fulton; Adam Spencer	
29	10 August 2015	Sharon Bird	Josh Frydenberg		Chris Hadfield; Anne Summers; ~~Jonathan Fine~~; Joe Hildebrand	
30	17 August 2015	Sam Dastyari	Kelly O'Dwyer	Richard Di Natale	Brendan O'Neill; Katy Faust	
31	24 August 2015	Anna Bligh	Peter Reith	Tony Windsor	Annabel Crabb; Louise Adler	
32	31 August 2015				Naomi Klein; Miroslav Volf; Tariq Ali; Laurie Penny; Tom Switzer	
33	7 September 2015	Chris Bowen	Mike Baird		Helen Joyce; Geoffrey Robertson; Catherine Livingstone	
34	14 September 2015	Terri Butler	~~Michael Keenan~~; John Hewson		Joan Baez; Tim Costello; Rowan Dean	
35	21 September 2015	Bill Shorten				
36	28 September 2015	Catherine King	Barnaby Joyce		David Marr; John Roskam; Elizabeth Ann Macgregor	
37	5 October 2015				Ian Hickie; Wayne Schwass; Pat Dudgeon; Fay Jackson; Roderick McKay	
38	12 October 2015	Lisa Singh	Ken Wyatt	Adam Bandt	Tania de Jong; Wesam Charkawi	
39	19 October 2015	Bob Carr			Michael Fullilove; Alison Broinowski; Emily Howie; Sow Keat Tok	
40	26 October 2015	Joel Fitzgibbon	Fiona Nash		Jan Thomas; Paul Antonio; Katie Noonan	
41	2 November 2015	Tony Burke	Simon Birmingham		Paul R. Ehrlich; Wendy Harmer; Dai Le	
42	9 November 2015				Andrew Denton; Karen Hitchcock; Ralph McConaghy; Ana Lamaro; Rodney Syme	
43	16 November 2015	Kate Ellis	Christopher Pyne	Nick Xenophon	Ian Smith; Holly Ransom	

== Season 9: 2016 ==
Episode	Date	Panellists				Topics
Episode	Date	Labor	Coalition	Minor Parties / Independents	Others	Topics
1	1 February 2016				David Morrison; Gordian Fulde; Catherine Keenan; Stan Grant; Manal Younus	
2	8 February 2016	Catherine King	Fiona Nash		Neil Mitchell; Grace Collier; Dave Oliver	
3	15 February 2016	Terri Butler	Steven Ciobo	Sarah Hanson-Young	Mark Steyn; Lenore Taylor	
4	22 February 2016	Tanya Plibersek	Michael Keenan		David Kilcullen; Eldad Beck; Raihan Ismail	
5	29 February 2016	Anna Burke	Bruce Billson		Lyle Shelton; Michele Levine; Kerryn Phelps	
6	7 March 2016	Penny Wong	Michaelia Cash		Mia Freedman; Alan Jones; Josh Zepps	
7	14 March 2016				Brian Greene; Tamara Davis; Alan Finkel; Emma Johnston; Upulie Divisekera	
8	21 March 2016		Daniel Andrews Josh Frydenberg	Jacqui Lambie	Clementine Ford; Elizabeth Proust	
9	28 March 2016		Ed Husic Wyatt Roy		Holly Ransom; Sandy Plunkett; Michael Biercuk	
10	4 April 2016	Amanda Rishworth	Christopher Pyne	Kelly Vincent	Greg Sheridan; Sameena Zehra	
11	11 April 2016	Lisa Singh	Sharman Stone		Theodore Dalrymple; Joseph Tawadros; Germaine Greer	
12	18 April 2016	Alannah MacTiernan	Ewen Jones John Hewson		Caroline Overington; Jane Caro	
13	25 April 2016				John Haldane; Julie McCrossin; Ray Minniecon; Tiffany Sparks; Lyle Shelton	
14	2 May 2016		Pru Goward		James Fallows; Laura Tingle; George Megalogenis; Iain Walker	
15	9 May 2016	Andrew Leigh	Kelly O'Dwyer Innes Willox	Adam Bandt	Cassandra Goldie	
16	16 May 2016	Alannah MacTiernan	Ewen Jones John Hewson		Kae Tempest; Jean-Christophe Rufin; Ayaan Hirsi Ali; Julian Baggini; Emma Sky	
17	23 May 2016	Anthony Albanese	Christopher Pyne			
18	30 May 2016		Terri Butler Steven Ciobo	Richard Di Natale; Nick Xenophon; Jacqui Lambie		
19	6 June 2016	Joel Fitzgibbon	Barnaby Joyce	Tony Windsor	Fiona Simson; Robbie Sefton	
20	13 June 2016	Bill Shorten				
21	20 June 2016		Malcolm Turnbull			
22	27 June 2016	Tanya Plibersek	Mathias Cormann; Alan Jones		Marcia Langton; Chris Richardson	
23	4 July 2016	Chris Bowen	Josh Frydenberg; Paul Kelly; Holly Ransom	Sarah Hanson-Young		
24	11 July 2016	Tanya Plibersek	George Brandis; Steve Price; Derryn Hinch		Van Badham	
25	18 July 2016	Sam Dastayari	Simon Birmingham	Larissa Waters; Pauline Hanson; Nick Xenophon		
26	25 July 2016	Ed Husic	Craig Laundy		Gillian Triggs; Peter Kurti; Shireen Morris	Incarceration, Islam and Innovation
27	1 August 2016	Lisa Singh	Matt Canavan		Peter Singer; Celeste Liddle; Kate Roffey	Rudd, Rehabilitation and Animal Ethics
28	8 August 2016	Bob Carr	–		Linda Tirado; P.J. O'Rourke; Lydia Khalil; Crispin Rovere	US Election
29	15 August 2016	Linda Burney	Greg Hunt	Malcolm Roberts	Brian Cox; Lily Serna	Experts and Empirical Evidence
30	22 August 2016	Catherine King	Mitch Fifield		Corinne Grant; Brendan O'Neill; Erin Watson-Lynn	Racism, Revenge Porn & Nauru
31	29 August 2016	Warren Mundine	–		Cassandra Goldie; Michael Marmot; Christine Bennett; Deborah Cobb-Clark	Social Determinants of Health
32	5 September 2016	–	–		John Bell; Kylie Farmer; Germaine Greer; Kate Mulvany; A.C. Grayling	Over 400 Years of Shakespeare
33	12 September 2016	Doug Cameron	Bridget McKenzie	Larissa Waters	Rowan Dean; Dai Le	Guns, Diversity and Donations
34	19 September 2016	Tony Burke	Fiona Nash	Jacqui Lambie	Jimmy Barnes; Magda Szubanski	Gay Marriage, Illegal Migrants and Masculinity
35	30 September 2016	Jay Weatherill; Penny Wong	Simon Birmingham; Amanda Vanstone			Education, Environment and Equality
36	3 October 2016	Mark Butler	Christian Porter		Marina Go; Eva Cox; Trisha Jha	Renewables, Welfare and Body Image
37	10 October 2016	–	Jim Molan		Shen Narayanasamy; Jane McAdam; Huy Truong; Frank Brennan	Australia's Sovereign Borders
38	17 October 2016	Tim Watts	John Roskam	Richard Di Natale	Judith Sloan; Grace Collier Ged Kearney	Industrial Relations and Respectful Relationships
39	24 October 2016	Tanya Plibersek	Arthur Sinodinos		Chris Mitchell; Robert Manne; Christine Dolan	Media Influence, Privacy and Secrecy
40	31 October 2016	Joel Fitzgibbon	Sussan Ley		Stefano de Pieri; Emma Germano; Katrina Myers	Refugee Ban, Backpackers and Cultural Capital
41	7 November 2016	Anthony Albanese	James Paterson		Naomi Klein; Don Watson; Georgina Dower	18C, Trump and Islands Sinking
42	14 November 2016	Kate Ellis	Barnaby Joyce		Helen Andrews; Joseph Siracusa; Jennifer Hunt	New World Order
43	21 November 2016	Terri Butler	Eric Abetz		Benjamin Law; Nakkiah Lui; Greg Sheridan	End of the Year, Dawn of an Era

== Season 10: 2017 ==
Episode	Date	Panellists				Topics
Episode	Date	Labor	Coalition	Minor Parties / Independents	Others	Topics
1	6 February 2017	Daniel Andrews	Josh Frydenberg		Daisy Cousens; Xiuhtezcatl Martinez; Helen Andrews	Trump, Climate Action and Youths
2	13 February 2017	Kate Ellis	James Paterson	Jacqui Lambie	Yassmin Abdel-Magied; Luca Belgiorno-Nettis	Blackouts, Childcare, and Migration; Sharia law
3	20 February 2017	Tanya Plibersek	George Brandis		Julian Burnside; Piers Akerman; Michele Levine	Pensions, Debt and NDIS
4	27 February 2017	Clare O'Neil	Scott Ryan		Peter Singer; Leyla Acaroglu; Ted Lapkin	Death and Disruption
5	6 March 2017	—N/a			Lindy West; Mei Fong; Thordis Elva; Faustina Agolley; Josephine Cashman	Strikes, Sexual Assault and Revenge Porn
6	13 March 2017	—N/a			Mem Fox; Martha Wainwright; Neil Armfield; Ursula Yovich; Kim Williams	
7	20 March 2017	Terri Butler	Zed Seselja		Wadah Khanfar; Claire Wardle; Mark Day	
8	27 March 2017	Amanda Rishworth	Bridget McKenzie		Mark Seymour; Peter Holmes à Court; Lydia Khalil; Kerry Chikarovski	
9	3 April 2017	Linda Burney	Josh Frydenberg		Muhammad Yunus; Helle Thorning-Schmidt; Paul Kelly	
10	10 April 2017	Penny Wong	Mitch Fifield		Nikki Gemmell; Margaret Somerville; Billy Bragg	
11	24 April 2017	Tony Burke	Alex Hawke	Derryn Hinch	Germaine Greer; Chido Govera	
12	1 May 2017	Tanya Plibersek	Barnaby Joyce		Armando Iannucci; Brian Schmidt; Laura Demasi	
13	8 May 2017	Lisa Singh	Dan Tehan		Dave Hughes; Mark Leibler; Danni Addison	
14	15 May 2017	Chris Bowen	Simon Birmingham	Larissa Waters	Innes Willox; Miranda Stewart	
15	22 May 2017	—N/a			Niki Savva; Lawrence M. Krauss; Mikhail Zygar; Mona Chalabi; Paul Beatty	
16	29 May 2017	—N/a			Noel Pearson; Pat Anderson; Megan Davis; Nakkiah Lui; Stan Grant	
17	5 June 2017	Anthony Albanese	Christian Porter	David Leyonhjelm	Judith Brett; Kiruna Stamell	
18	12 June 2017	Mark Butler	Josh Frydenberg		Alan Finkel; Rosemary Sinclair; Amanda McKenzie	
19	19 June 2017	Linda Burney	James Paterson		Jane Goodall; Peter Kurti; Rachel Botsman	
20	26 June 2017	Clare O'Neil	Christopher Pyne		Alastair Campbell; Grahame Morris; Anna Greenberg	
21	3 July 2017	Warren Snowdon		Bob Katter	Jacinta Price; Dale McIver; Josie Douglas; William Tilmouth	
22	17 July 2017	Terri Butler	Matt Canavan		Rachel Corbett; John Stackhouse; Mehdi Hasan	
23	24 July 2017	Catherine King	Josh Frydenberg		Pinidu Chandrasekera; Jock Maddern; Jacinta Speer	
24	31 July 2017	Jim Chalmers	Steven Ciobo		Mei Fong; Jessica Irvine; Greg Sheridan	
25	7 August 2017		Nigel Scullion		Marcia Langton; Noel Pearson; Denise Bowden; Djapirri Mununggirritj; Nyamba Buru Yawuru	
26	14 August 2017	Sam Dastyari	Eric Abetz		Michael Jensen; Jamila Rizvi; Kim Rubenstein	
27	21 August 2017	Bill Shorten				
28	28 August 2017	Tony Burke	George Brandis	Jacqui Lambie	Dan Sultan; Christine Forster	
29	4 September 2017				Michael Fullilove; Rutger Bregman; Laurie Penny; Shashi Tharoor; Amani Al-Khatahtbeh	
30	11 September 2017	Mark Dreyfus	Zed Seselja	Lucy Gichuhi	A.C. Grayling; Merav Michaeli	
31	18 September 2017	Penny Wong	Michael Sukkar	Sarah Hanson-Young	Emma Herd; Bret Stephens	
32	2 October 2017	Ed Husic	Craig Laundy		Catherine Ball; Sandra Peter; Adam Spencer	
33	9 October 2017	Amanda Rishworth	Matt Canavan	Richard Di Natale	Peggy O'Neal; Michele Levine	
34	16 October 2017	Anne Aly	Bridget McKenzie Tim Fischer		Jimmy Barnes; Lydia Khalil	
35	23 October 2017				Glenn Davies; Karina Okotel; Frank Brennan; Magda Szubanski	Same-sex marriage
36	30 October 2017	Kevin Rudd			Laura Tingle; Judith Brett; Alan Jones	
37	6 November 2017	Tanya Plibersek	Simon Birmingham		Arthur Lim; Nadia Homem; Geordie Brown; Lauren McGrath-Wild	
38	13 November 2017	Terri Butler	Angus Taylor		Brian Cox; Judith Sloan; Shara Evans	
39	20 November 2017	Brendan O'Connor	George Brandis	Jacqui Lambie Janet Rice	Stephen O'Doherty	
40	27 November 2017	Murray Watt	James McGrath		Lenore Taylor; Jan Fran; Warren Mundine	
41	4 December 2017	Lisa Singh	Eric Abetz		Simon Breheny; Gillian Triggs; Kate McClymont	
42	11 December 2017		Malcolm Turnbull			
43	18 December 2017	Anthony Albanese Maxine McKew	Greg Hunt		Greg Sheridan; Alice Workman	

== Season 11: 2018 ==
Episode	Date	Panellists				Topics
Episode	Date	Labor	Coalition	Minor Parties / Independents	Others	Topics
1	5 February 2018				Chris Richardson; Heather Ridout; Sally McManus; Stephen Mayne; James Pearson	A Spotlight on the Economy
2	12 February 2018	Terri Butler	Linda Reynolds John Hewson		Chris Kenny; Van Badham	Nepotism, Referendums & Radical Reform
3	15 February 2018				Catharine Lumby; Isabella Manfredi; Josh Bornstein; Janet Albrechtsen	MeToo Special hosted by Virginia Trioli
4	19 February 2018	Chris Bowen	Josh Frydenberg		Louise Adler; Shareena Clanton; Simon Breheny	Civil War, Colonisation and Power
5	26 February 2018	Clare O'Neil	Zed Seselja		Harriet Harman; A.C. Grayling; Catherine McGregor	DPM, Politics and Pay Gaps
6	5 March 2018	Tanya Plibersek	Angus Taylor	Richard Di Natale	Kamila Shamsie; Sharri Markson	Family Matters and Home Fires
7	12 March 2018	Bob Carr			Tim Flannery; John Daley; Jane Fitzgerald; Jiyoung Song	A Big Australia
8	19 March 2018	Mark Butler	Paul Fletcher		Tom Switzer; Alice Workman; Lydia Khalil	Tax, Trump and The Polls
9	26 March 2018				Michael Sandel	A Night with Michael Sandel
10	9 April 2018	Clare O'Neil	Alan Tudge		Stuart Bateson; Andrew Rule; Nyadol Nyuon	Polling, Policing and Reporting
11	16 April 2018	Amanda Rishworth	Mitch Fifield		Missy Higgins; Grahame Morris; Kenneth Roth	Privacy, Missile Strikes and Celebrity Activism
12	23 April 2018	Andrew Leigh	Fiona Nash		John Roskam; Rebecca Huntley; Jill Sheppard	Class Divides and Inequality
13	30 April 2018				Katy Tur; Wesley Morris; Masha Gessen; Richard McGregor	Trump, Twitter & North Korea
14	7 May 2018	Linda Burney	Tim Wilson		Stanley Johnson; Leyla Acaroglu; Jeremy Heimans	Newstart, New Power and New Jobs
15	14 May 2018	Chris Bowen	Angus Taylor		Elizabeth Proust; Judith Sloan; Ben Oquist	A Broader Budget
16	21 May 2018	Julie Collins	Jane Hume		Peter Singer; Randa Abdel-Fattah; Greg Sheridan	Weddings, Gaza and Losing Faith
17	28 May 2018	Ged Kearney	Jim Molan		Rod Bower; Monica Doumit; Tim Fung	First Responders, Refugees and Flexible Working
18	4 June 2018	Mark Dreyfus	Dan Tehan	Jacqui Lambie	Rosie Waterland; Grace Collier	Chaos, Ego and Cash
19	11 June 2018	Bill Shorten				Q&A with Bill Shorten
20	18 June 2018	Tim Watts	Linda Reynolds		Michael Spence; Simon Jackman; Aubrey Blanche	Being Careful, North Korea and Culture Wars
21	25 June 2018				Kiruna Stamell; Dylan Alcott; Graeme Innes; Catia Malaquias; Bruce Bonyhady	Q&A Enabled
22	2 July 2018	Catherine King	Sarah Henderson	Cory Bernardi	Erik Jensen; Corey White	Abuse, Foster Care and Taxes
23	9 July 2018	Tanya Plibersek	Matt Canavan		Teela Reid; Mitchell Walton; Kumbi Gutsa; Victoria Fielding	Q&A People's Panel
24	23 July 2018				Craig Reucassel; Ronni Kahn; Jo Taranto; David O'Loughlin; Gayle Sloan	War on Waste
25	30 July 2018	Jim Chalmers	Mitch Fifield		Lenore Taylor; Parnell Palme McGuinness; Tony Winwood	Super Saturday and Media Diversity
26	6 August 2018	Joel Fitzgibbon	David Littleproud		Fiona Simson; Jenny Dowell; Matt Sorenson	Drought Relief and Future Farming
27	13 August 2018	Anne Aly	Eric Abetz		Cornel West; Lindsay Shepherd; Jeremy Bell	Power, Spirituality and Free Speech
28	20 August 2018				John Marsden; Maxine Beneba Clarke; Sofie Laguna; Michael Ahmad; Trent Dalton	Stranger than Fiction
29	27 August 2018	Cathy O'Toole	George Christensen	Pauline Hanson; Larissa Waters; Bob Katter		Chaos, Crocs and Coal Mining
30	3 September 2018	Anthony Albanese	Steven Ciobo		Alan Jones; Annika Smethurst; Elmari Whyte	Media Power, Popularity and Special Envoys
31	10 September 2018	Penny Wong	Bridget McKenzie		Dylan Storer; Joanne Tran; Rueben Davis; Holly Cooke	High School Special 3
32	17 September 2018				Germaine Greer; Andrew Neil; David Marr; Sisonke Msimang Elena Jeffcoat	Rape, Racism and No-Platforming
33	1 October 2018	Amanda Rishworth	Simon Birmingham	Sarah Hanson-Young	John Butler; Sali Miftari	Bullying, quotas, and the ABC
34	8 October 2018				Eddie Woo; Pasi Sahlberg; Cindy Berwick; Gabbie Stroud; Jennifer Buckingham	Teaching Special
35	15 October 2018	Terri Butler	James Paterson		Jeffrey Sachs; James Bartholomew; Linda McIver	Climate, Welfare and Religious Schools
36	22 October 2018	Anthony Albanese	Philip Ruddock	Kerryn Phelps	Peter van Onselen; Anne Summers	Wentworth by-election Special
37	29 October 2018				Neil Armfield; Nakkiah Lui; Toby Schmitz; Zindzi Okenyo; Miles Gregory	Live from the Pop-up Globe
38	5 November 2018				Toby Walsh; Nikki Goldstein; Chuck Klosterman; Betty Grumble; Van Badham	Sex Robots, Killer Robots: A Dangerous Q&A
39	8 November 2018		Malcolm Turnbull			Malcolm Turnbull on Q&A
40	12 November 2018	Chris Bowen	Zed Seselja John Anderson		Gillian Triggs; Parnell Palme McGuinness	Trust, Leadership, and Stability
41	19 November 2018	Mark Dreyfus	Alex Hawke		Susan Glasser; Greg Sheridan; Karen Middleton	Tourism, Trump, and the Embassy
42	26 November 2018	Doug Cameron	Eric Abetz	Mehreen Faruqi	Tom Switzer; Yasmin Poole	VicVotes, Terrorism, and Gender
43	3 December 2018	Lisa Singh	Linda Reynolds Amanda Vanstone		Billy Bragg; Martin Matthews	Protest and Pre-selection
44	3 December 2018	Tanya Plibersek	Scott Ryan	Richard Di Natale	Nyadol Nyuon; Brendan O'Neill	2018 Finale

== Season 12: 2019 ==
Episode	Date	Panellists				Topics
Episode	Date	Labor	Coalition	Minor Parties / Independents	Others	Topics
1	4 February 2019			Julia Banks; Andrew Wilkie; Adam Bandt; Kerryn Phelps; Rebekha Sharkie		The Boats, the Banks, and the River
2	11 February 2019	Mark Dreyfus	Sarah Henderson		Stephen Mayne; Megan Purcell; Zoya Patel	Manus, Hakeem, and Franking Credits
3	18 February 2019				Stuart Smith; Kerryn Redpath; David Caldicott; Marianne Jauncey; Mick Palmer	Drugs
4	25 February 2019	Terri Butler	Alex Hawke		Catherine McGregor; Jordan Peterson; Van Badham	Jordan Peterson Destroys Q&A
5	4 March 2019	Kristina Keneally	Jim Molan		Francis Sullivan; Viv Waller; Rabbi Shmuley	A Church in Crisis
6	11 March 2019	Linda Burney	Karen Andrews	Sarah Hanson-Young	Sabina Shugg Nicole Livingstone	Women in Leadership
7	18 March 2019	Cathy O'Toole	Linda Reynolds		Stephen Williams Jane McMillan Roger Hill	Q&A In Townsville
8	25 March 2019	Tony Burke	Teena McQueen	Meereen Faruqi	Roxane Gay Simon Cowan	Roxane Gay on Q&A
9	1 April 2019	Amanda Rishworth	Arthur Sinodinos		Rebecca Huntley John Roskam Lakshmi Logathassan	Cash, Guns, Gangs and Life
10	8 April 2019		Josh Frydenberg			Budget Special
11	15 April 2019	Terri Butler	James McGrath	Larissa Waters Malcolm Roberts		Election 2019: The Battle For Queensland
12	29 April 2019	Chris Bowen	Mitch Fifield		Lenore Taylor Bhakthi Puvanenthiran Greg Sheridan	The Election Countdown
13	6 May 2019	Bill Shorten				Bill Shorten on Q&A
14	13 May 2019	Tanya Plibersek	Simon Birmingham	Richard Di Natale Helen Haines		The Q&A Last Chance Saloon
15	20 May 2019	Jim Chalmers	Christopher Pyne		Alice Workman Ming Long Alan Jones	The Wash Up
16	27 May 2019	Mary Dreyfus	Tim Wilson		Marcia Langton Paul Kelly Rachael Jacobs	First Australians and Quiet Australians
17	3 June 2019	Joel Fitzgibbon	Nicolle Flint		Jimmy Barnes Sisonke Msimang Matthew Warren	Jimmy Barnes Rocks Q&A
18	10 June 2019				Adam Briggs Faustina Agolley Mike Cannon-Brookes Larry Marshall Jocelyn Brewer	Q&A Vivid
19	17 June 2019				Brian Cox Emma Johnston David Karoly Kirsten Banks Martin Van Kranendonk	Q&A Science Special
20	24 June 2019	Catherine King	Dan Tehan	Rex Patrick	Sally Rugg Ash Belsar	The Freedom to Fund Yourself
21	1 July 2019	Clare O'Neil	James Paterson		Jamila Rizvi Grace Kelly Greg Day	Union Bosses and Suburban Dads
22	8 July 2019	Penny Wong	Scott Ryan		Diana Sayed Tom Switzer Hugh White	Nukes In An Uncertain World
23	15 July 2019	Linda Burney	Jim Molan	Rebekha Sharkie	Sami Shah Toby Ralph	Deemed Not To Matter
24	22 July 2019				Alastair Campbell Geoff Gallop Kate Mills Nick Cater Anne Tiernan	Boris, Brexit, and the Black Dog
25	29 July 2019	Kimberley Kitching	Eric Abetz		Tim Costello Parnell Palme McGuinness Adam Liaw	Wage Theft and Celebrity Chefs
26	5 August 2019	Katy Gallagher	Jason Falinski	Zali Steggall	Cassandra Goldie Adam Creighton	Zali's Political Slalom
27	12 August 2019	Terri Butler	Alan Tudge		A. C. Grayling Clare Wright Li Shee Su	How Good is Democracy?
28	19 August 2019	Linda Burney	Julian Leeser		Jacinta Price Patricia Turner Sally Scales	The Indigenous Voice
29	26 August 2019	Kristina Keneally	Gladys Berejiklian		William Gillett Aurora Matchett Willoughby Duff Varsha Yajman	Q&A High School Special
30	2 September 2019				Lionel Shriver DeRay Mckesson Ruby Hamad Benjamin Law Steve Coll	Lionel Shriver and DeRay Mckesson: Writers on Q&A
31	9 September 2019	Anne Aly	Zed Seselja	Jordon Steele-John	Danielle Wood Greg Sheridan	Donations, Disability, and Disillusionment
32	16 September 2019	Madeleine King Sam Dastyari	James Paterson		Eva Cox John Lee	The Political Donations Arms Race
33	23 September 2019	Chris Bowen	Paul Fletcher		Kerry O'Brien Jan Fran Dai Le	Kerry O'Brien and Your Right To Know
34	30 September 2019				Katie Noonan Jonathon Welch Mojo Juju Tex Perkins L-FRESH The Lion	The Power of Music
35	7 October 2019	Julie Collins	Richard Colbeck		Maggie Beer Sarah Holland-Batt Sean Rooney	A Spotlight on Aged Care
36	14 October 2019	Tim Watts	Tim Wilson		Vicky Xu Jennifer Hewett Simon Longstaff	Democracy or Disruption?
37	21 October 2019				John Hewson Veela Sahajwalla Julian Cribb Jordan Nguyen Chloë Spackman	Q&A: Future Alert
38	28 October 2019	Joel Fitzgibbon	David Littleproud		Fiona Simson Maryanne Slattery Kate McBride	The Drought
39	4 November 2019				Mona Eltahawy Jess Hill Nayuka Gorrie Ashton Applewhite Hana Assafiri	Q&A Broadside
40	11 November 2019	Mark Butler	Jason Falinski		Ross Garnaut Sarah McNamara Sarah Friar	Climate and Catastrophe
41	18 November 2019	Anne Aly	Zak Kirkup		Hannah McGlade Lanai Scarr Dylan Storer	Q&A in WA
42	25 November 2019	Tanya Plibersek			Samantha Power Tamar Zandberg Greg Sheridan James Brown	International Power
43	2 December 2019		Alex Hawke		Aiyaz Sayed-Khaiyum Enele Sopoaga Manu Tupou-Roosen Virisila Buadromo	Q&A Pacific
44	9 December 2019	Anthony Albanese	Malcolm Turnbull		Sisonke Msimang Patricia Turner Brian Schmidt	The End of an Era – Q&A 2019 Finale

== Season 13: 2020 ==
Episode	Date	Panellists				Topics
Episode	Date	Labor	Coalition	Minor Parties / Independents	Others	Topics
1	3 February 2020	Kristy McBain	Jim Molan Andrew Constance		Victor Steffensen Cheryl McCarthy Michael Mann	Q+A Bushfires Special
2	10 February 2020				Osher Günsberg Jennifer Westacott Sophia Hamblin Wang Matt Evans Martijn Wilder Paul Kelly (Musical Guest)	Climate Solutions
3	17 February 2020	Clare O'Neil	Katie Allen	Jacqui Lambie	Jack Manning Bancroft Simon McKeon	Trust
4	24 February 2020				Wang Xining Stan Grant Raina MacIntyre Jason Yat-Sen Li Vicky Xu	Australia and China: A Healthy Relationship?
5	2 March 2020	Nova Peris			Tarang Chawla Marlee Silva Anthony Lehmann	The Australian Identity: Who Are We?
6	9 March 2020	Tanya Plibersek			Adrian Piccoli Eddie Woo John Collier Vy Tran	Education: Are We Failing?
7	16 March 2020	Katy Gallagher	Richard Colbeck		Bill Bowtell Mukesh Haikerwal Sam Mostyn	The Corona Challenge: Are We Prepared?
8	23 March 2020				Norman Swan Sharon Lewin Paul Kelly	Coronavirus: Ask The Doctors
9	30 March 2020	Linda Burney	Michael Sukkar		Nicki Hutley Matt Comyn Jennifer Westacott Josh Pyke	Coronavirus: The Cost
10	6 April 2020	Chris Bowen	Katie Allen		Stephen Parnis Danielle Austin Vyom Sharma Lucy Morgan	Coronavirus: Stories From The Frontline
11	13 April 2020				Matt Preston Craig Foster Julie McCrossin John Anderson Christine Morgan	Surviving Lockdown
12	20 April 2020				Neville Power Sally McManus Simon Longstaff Gigi Foster Jodie McVernon	COVID-19: Where to Next?
13	27 April 2020		Dan Tehan		Nick Coatsworth Lisa Jackson Pulver Mark Scott Lian Davies	Education in the Age of COVID-19
14	4 May 2020	Penny Wong	Dave Sharma		Michael Fullilove Elaine Pearson	The Post-COVID World Order
15	11 May 2020	Dan Andrews Annastacia Palaszczuk	Gladys Berejiklian			Q+A: The Premiers
16	18 May 2020				Yael Stone Sophie Johnson Tim Fung Danielle Wood Innes Willox	Young and Free?
17	25 May 2020				Lucy Turnbull Jordan Nguyen Alan Finkel Rae Johnston Genevieve Bell	Australia Reimagined
18	1 June 2020	Joel Fitzgibbon	Matt Canavan	Zali Steggall	Zoe Whitton Sophia Wang	Our Energy Future
19	8 June 2020	Jim Chalmers	Andrew Bragg		Nakkiah Lui Nyadol Nyuon Meyne Wyatt	Hard Truths
20	15 June 2020				Andrew Abdo Brendon Gale Tracey Holmes Bruce Djite Sharni Layton	The Future of Sport
21	22 June 2020			Nick Xenophon	Dennis Richardson Annika Smethurst Clinton Fernandes Jacinta Carroll	Australia: Secret State
22	29 June 2020	Bill Shorten	Paul Fletcher		Katie Noonan Yasmin Poole Sue Morphet	Saving the Arts and 'Brain Farts'
23	6 July 2020	Terri Butler	Christopher Pyne		Shaun Micallef Brooke Boney	Borders, Booze and the Big Spend on Defence
24	13 July 2020	Julia Gillard				Julia Gillard on Q+A
25	20 July 2020		Sarah Henderson	Adam Bandt	Margy Osmond Jodie McVernon L-FRESH the Lion	Disrupted Recovery
26	27 July 2020	Katy Gallagher	Simon Birmingham		Bill Bowtell Gigi Foster George Megalogenis Cassandra Goldie Karen Soo	Fight Of Our Lives
27	3 August 2020	Ged Kearney	Andrew Laming	Kerryn Phelps	Lucy Morgon Vyom Sharma Abbey Fistrovic	The Front Line
28	10 August 2020	Kimberley Kitching	Tim Wilson		Dinesh Palipana Michele O'Neil Paul Waterson Killian Ashe	State of Disaster
29	17 August 2020	Michelle Rowland	Barnaby Joyce		Antoinette Lattouf Niki Savva Ziggy Ramo Sinead Boucher	Media and Misinformation
30	24 August 2020	Anika Wells	Andrew Bragg	Jordon Steele-John	Scott Yung Ahmed Hassan Kate McBride Hamani Tanginoa	Generation Covid
31	31 August 2020				Kerry O'Brien Jillian Broadbent Colin Barnett Ray Minniecon Ronni Kahn	Panel of Wisdom
32	7 September 2020	Kristina Keneally	Michael McCormack		Omar Khorshid Kim Rubenstein Tania de Jong	Border Wars
33	14 September 2020				Gus Worland Sarah Wilson Hugh Mackay Michelle Lim Rosemary Kayess	The Age of Loneliness
34	21 September 2020				Kim Hoggard Barbara Heineback Cole Brown John Ruddick Kylie Morris	US Election 2020: Four More Years?
35	28 September 2020	Mark Butler	Darren Chester		Mike Cannon-Brookes Marian Wilkinson Yun Jiang	Road to Recovery

== Season 14: 2021 ==
Episode	Date	Panellists				Topics
Episode	Date	Labor	Coalition	Minor Parties / Independents	Others	Topics
1	4 February 2021		Alexander Downer Warren Mundine		Grace Tame Shane Fitzsimmons Tanya Hosch	Calling It Out
2	11 February 2021	Michelle Ananda-Rajah			Nick Coatsworth Sharon Lewin Tony Blakely	Q+A on Vaccines: What do you want to know?
3	18 February 2021	Michelle Rowland	Paul Fletcher		Julie Inman Grant Lydia Khalil Hal Crawford	Bargaining with Big Tech
4	25 February 2021	Clare O'Neil	Katie Allen Mike Baird		Jane Halton Joseph Ibrahim	Spotlight on Aged Care
5	4 March 2021	Anne Aly	Susan McDonald		Isabel Allende Samantha Maiden Dhanya Mani Kate Crawford Hani Abdile	All About Women
6	11 March 2021	Kristina Keneally	Zed Seselja		Gareth Parker; Fiona Simson; Kim Rubenstein	On the Rebound
7	18 March 2021				Stan Grant Bruce Pascoe Sam Mostyn Gigi Foster Adam Creighton Thomas Piketty	Fixing the Future
8	25 March 2021				Yumi Stynes Briony Scott Michael Slater Yasmin Poole Joe Williams	Consent
9	8 April 2021	Anika Wells	Trent Zimmerman		Martyn Iles Antoinette Lattouf Teela Reid	Vaccines, the Church, and the State of Politics
10	15 April 2021	Katy Gallagher	James Paterson		Norman Swan Vicky Xu David Olsson	It's Complicated: Vaccines, China, and Saying Sorry
11	22 April 2021		Malcolm Turnbull Keith Pitt	Sarah Hanson-Young	Narelda Jacobs Andrew Liveris	Climate, Politics, and 'Fossil Fools'
12	29 April 2021	Mark Butler	Bridget McKenzie		Courtney Act Parnell Palme McGuinness Hervé Lemahieu	Diversity, Double Standards, and Aussies Trapped Abroad
13	6 May 2021	Linda Burney	Fiona Martin		Alan Kohler Jess Hill Bri Lee	Power and Control
14	13 May 2021	Jim Chalmers	Jane Hume	Larissa Waters Jacqui Lambie Helen Haines		Budget 2021 Special
15	20 May 2021	Tony Burke	Barnaby Joyce		Luke McGregor Gabriela D'Souza Zoe Whitton	Barnaby Meets Lukenomics
16	27 May 2021	Ed Husic	Dave Sharma		Jennifer Robinson Mitch Tambo Randa Abdel-Fattah	Trauma and Truth-Telling
17	3 June 2021	Stephen Jones	Tim Wilson		Diane Smith-Gander Gordon Bradbery Lisa Jackson Pulver	Vaccine, Quarantine and Life Outside the Big Cities
18	10 June 2021				Cameron Murray Kamalini Lokuge Omar Khorshid Peter Hartcher Sally Scales	Health and Humanity
19	17 June 2021	Clare O'Neil	Darren Chester		Hana Assafiri Susan Alberti Tom Elliott	Boats, Boys Clubs and Businesses on the bRint
20	24 June 2021	Andrew Leigh	Hollie Hughes		Bill Bowtell Jayden Evans Mary-Louise McLaws	Sydney Surge and Life on the Spectrum
21	1 July 2021	Annastacia Palaszczuk Michelle Ananda-Rajah			David Speers Jennifer Hewett Stephen Duckett	Vaccines: Supply and Demand
22	8 July 2021	Malarndirri McCarthy	Katie Allen		Cameron Stewart; Peter Singer; Santilla Chingaipe	The Ethics of Accountability
23	15 July 2021				Alison Pennington Mukesh Haikerwal Mary-Louise McLaws Meshel Laurie Steve Price	Dealing with Delta
24	22 July 2021	Bill Shorten	David Gillespie		Astrid Edwards Libby Trickett Russel Howcroft	The Olympics and Opening Up
25	29 July 2021	Chris Bowen	Andrew Bragg	Clover Moore	Deborah Cheetham Michael Mohammed Ahmad	Sending in the Army and Getting Back to Work
26	5 August 2021				Damien Cave Eric Feigl-Ding Helen Clark Julie Leask Kate Mills Yulia Supadmo	Opening Up: Lessons from the World
27	12 August 2021	Catherine King	Matt Canavan		Alan Kohler Angela Jackson Paul Zahra	The Cost of Climate and COVID
28	19 August 2021	Bob Carr	Darren Chester		Diana Sayed Lydia Khalil Yalda Hakim	The Taliban's Takeover and Afghanistan's Future
29	26 August 2021				Anthea Rhodes Arth Tuteja Norman Swan Fiona Russell Petria Houvardas	The Kids are Alright: COVID-19 and Young People
30	2 September 2021	Penny Wong	Anne Ruston		Grace Tame Marcia Langton Reece Kershaw	Women's Safety: Less Talk, More Action
31	9 September 2021			Julia Banks	John Safran Rachel Doyle Tony Armstrong Virginia Gay Yanis Varoufakis	The Power of Words
32	16 September 2021	Linda Burney Khal Asfour	Dave Sharma		John Lee Mariam Veiszadeh	A Tale of Two Cities
33	23 September 2021				Brian Schmidt Lidia Morawska Michael Biercuk Toby Walsh Vanessa Pirotta	A Trip to the Future: A Q+A Science Special
34	30 September 2021				Bruce Keebaugh Dinesh Palipana Jennifer Westacott Sally McManus Simon Longstaff	The Ethics of Mandatory Vaccines
35	7 October 2021	Tanya Plibersek	Paul Fletcher		Alastair MacGibbon Marc Fennell Zara Seidler	Corruption, Scams and Misinformation
35	14 October 2021	Mark Dreyfus	Andrew Bragg	Helen Haines	Craig Reucassel Kate Roffey	Big Money and Politics
36	21 October 2021	Chris Bowen	Tim Wilson		Amelia Telford Anne Baker Simon Holmes à Court	Australia's Climate Future
37	28 October 2021				Bri Lee John Bell Nakkiah Lui Paul McDermott Tim Dean	The Power and Appeal of Shakespeare
38	4 November 2021		Matt Kean	Adam Bandt	Blair Palese Kavita Naidu Greg Sheridan	Lies, Leaks and Climate Promises
39	11 November 2021	Ed Husic	James Paterson		Chris Uhlmann Lavina Lee Yun Jiang	Shifting Alliances
40	18 November 2021				Andy Penn Eliza Hull Emma Fulu George Megalogenis Jane Halton	The Great Resignation
41	25 November 2021	Andrew Barr	Jason Falinski		Melinda Cilento Michael Jensen Yaara Bou Melham	Freedom, Faith, and Crossing the Floor
42	2 December 2021		John Roskam		Missy Higgins Narelda Jacobs Arj Barker Hugh van Cuylenburg	Power, Protests and Parliament: Q+A Season Finale

== Season 15: 2022 ==
Episode	Date	Panellists				Title
Episode	Date	Labor	Coalition	Minor Parties / Independents	Others	Title
1	10 February 2022	Tanya Plibersek	Katie Allen		Dylan Alcott Rosie Batty Tom Calma	Power, Expectations and Making Change
2	17 February 2022	Chris Bowen	Andrew Constance	Allegra Spender	Lavina Lee Greg Sheridan	Russia, Donations and Distractions
3	24 February 2022	Stephen Jones	Bridget Archer		Jelena Dokic Brooke Blurton Mark Cross	Opening Up: Anxiety and Mental Health (with a live performance from the legendary Archie Roach)
4	3 March 2022	Brendan O'Connor	Jason Falinski		Dennis Richardson Deborah Snow Olga Boichak	Putin's War
5	10 March 2022				Lillian Flex Mami Ahenkan Wendy McCarthy Najeeba Wazefadost Fiona Simson Claire Lehmann	Feminism, Floods and Refugees
6	17 March 2022	Anne Aly	Sarah Henderson Pru Goward		Roxane Gay Thomas Mayo (Note: Formerly known as Thomas Mayor.)	Cancel Culture and Branding Balls-Ups
7	24 March 2022	Terri Butler	Dan Tehan		Omar Khorshid Ronni Kahn Melinda Cilento	Cost of Living and the Bottom Line
8	31 March 2022	Jim Chalmers	Barnaby Joyce	Jacqui Lambie Zali Steggall	Paul Kelly	Budget Special
9	7 April 2022	Clare O'Neil	Anne Ruston		Samantha Maiden Steph Tisdell Gideon Rozner	The Election Countdown
10	14 April 2022	Chris Bowen	Andrew Bragg		Osher Günsberg Megan Davis Kate McBride	The Race for the Nation
11	21 April 2022	Murray Watt	Keith Pitt	Bob Katter	Bronwyn Fredericks Amanda Cahill	Live from Gladstone
12	28 April 2022	Anika Wells	Stuart Robert	Campbell Newman Larissa Waters	Caitlyn Byrne	Inflation, Floods and Preparing for War
13	5 May 2022	Anthony Albanese				Anthony Albanese on Q+A
14	12 May 2022	Catherine King	Paul Fletcher		Caroline Di Russo Siimon Reynolds Intifar Chowdhury	The Undecided Voters
15	19 May 2022	Josh Burns	James Paterson	Cathy McGowan	Gigi Foster Peter Hartcher	The Final Countdown Hosted by David Speers.
16	26 May 2022	Amanda Rishworth	Andrew Bragg Alexander Downer	Mehreen Faruqi Monique Ryan		The Election Battle and 'Nicer' Politics (with a live performance from Kate Miller-Heidke) Hosted by David Speers.
17	2 Jun 2022	Linda Burney	Julian Leeser		Gail Mabo Chris Kenny Shireen Morris Frank Brennan	Mabo, a Voice and the Road Ahead Hosted by Stan Grant.
18	9 Jun 2022	Tony Burke	Paul Fletcher		Katie Noonan Darren Hayes Adam Liaw	A Kick in the Arts (with a live performance by the Australian Vocal Ensemble featuring Katie Noonan) Hosted by Virginia Trioli.
19	16 Jun 2022	Chris Bowen		Zoe Daniel	Saul Griffith Sarah McNamara Tony Wood	Australia's Energy Crisis Hosted by Virginia Trioli.
20	23 Jun 2022	Brendan O'Connor	Bridget McKenzie		Gabriela D'Souza Lech Blaine Alexi Boyd	Price Pressures and Postcode Discrimination; Recorded in Werribee, Victoria. Hosted by David Speers.
21	7 July 2022	Anne Aly			Anne Summers Jess Hill Arman Abrahimzadeh	The Choice: Violence or Poverty Hosted by Virginia Trioli.
22	14 July 2022	Peter Khalil	George Brandis		Vasyl Myroshnychenko Kylie Moore-Gilbert Hugh White	A Foreign Affair: Boris, AUKUS, Ukraine and Assange Hosted by David Speers.
23	1 August 2022	Linda Burney	Jacinta Nampijinpa Price	Yiŋiya Mark Guyula	June Oscar Dean Parkin Mayatili Marika	Garma 2022; Recorded at Garma Festival, Northern Territory. [Returned to Monday night 9.30pm timeslot] Hosted by Stan Grant.
24	4 August 2022	Jenny McAllister		Sarah Hanson-Young	Larry Marshall Warren Mundine Hannah Diviney	Global Megatrends and Lived Experiences Hosted by Stan Grant.
25	11 August 2022	Pat Conroy	James Paterson		Sharan Burrow Jennifer Hsu Damien Cave	China, Democracy and Capitalism Hosted by Stan Grant.
26	18 August 2022	Murray Watt	Catherine Cusack Keith Pitt		Johann Hari Blak Douglas Amanda Rose	Morrison's Secret Ministries Hosted by Stan Grant.
27	25 August 2022				Kieren Perkins Hannah Mouncey Joe Williams David Lakisa Catherine Ordway	Sports, Inclusion and Redemption Hosted by Stan Grant.
28	1 September 2022	Katy Gallagher	Stuart Robert		A.C. Grayling Wendy El-Khoury Catherine Marriott	Workers, Taxes and Getting a Fair Go Hosted by Stan Grant.
29	8 September 2022				Brian Cox Marlon Williams Deborah Cheetham Andrew Quilty Catherine McGregor	Ambition, Power and Storytelling Without A Pen; Melbourne Writers Festival special Hosted by Stan Grant.
30	15 September 2022		Eric Abetz		Teela Reid Simon Longstaff Sisonke Msimang Ruth Ben-Ghiat	Royalty, a Republic and Truth-Telling Hosted by Stan Grant.
31	29 September 2022	Ed Husic	Bridget McKenzie	Jacqui Lambie	Ben Abbatangelo Alan Jones	Corruption, Sport and Big Corporates: Who Can We Trust? Hosted by Stan Grant.
32	5 October 2022	Amanda Rishworth		Mehreen Faruqi	Jonathan Sumption Francis Awaritefe Alan Oster	Religion, Economics and Extremism Hosted by Stan Grant.
33	13 October 2022		Perin Davey		Erin Brockovich Stephen Jones Tim Costello Saba Vasefi	Protests, People and Power Hosted by Stan Grant.
34	20 October 2022	Chris Bowen			Ross Garnaut Yun Jiang Varsha Yajman Anthony Tran	Climate Targets, Floods and Taxes Hosted by Stan Grant.
35	27 October 2022	Katy Gallagher	Jane Hume	Dai Le	George Megalogenis Sonia Arakkal	Budget Special Hosted by Stan Grant.
36	3 November 2022	Jim Chalmers, Treasurer				Jim Chalmers on Q+A Hosted by Stan Grant.
37	10 November 2022	Anne Aly	Dan Tehan		Kamila Shamsie Joe Siracusa Alastair MacGibbon	Cyber Hacks, Musk and Trump Hosted by David Speers.
38	17 November 2022	Peter Khalil	Joe Hockey		Santilla Chingaipe Lawrence Freedman Gideon Rachman	Power, Politics, and the Spectre of War Hosted by Stan Grant.
39	24 November 2022	Bill Shorten	Stuart Robert	Jordon Steele-John	Elly Desmarchelier Amy Auster	The Value of NDIS Hosted by Stan Grant.
40	1 December 2022	Nova Peris	Matt Kean	Allegra Spender	Grace Tame Josh Szeps	Q+A 2022 Finale: Respect and Understanding Hosted by Stan Grant (with a performance by Stephen Oliver).

== Season 16: 2023 ==
Episode	Date	Panellists				Title
Episode	Date	Labor	Coalition	Minor Parties / Independents	Others	Title
1	30 January 2023	Malarndirri McCarthy	Bridget McKenzie	Lidia Thorpe	Craig Foster Tom Calma	Year of the Voice; Hosted by Stan Grant.
2	6 February 2023	Stephen Jones	Jacqui Munro Dan Tehan		Behrouz Boochani Catherine Liddle	Rights, Refugees and Fighting for Fairness; Hosted by Stan Grant.
3	13 February 2023	Anne Aly	Keith Wolahan	Dorinda Cox	Jon Sopel Toby Walsh	ChatGPT, Inflation, and Dave; Hosted by Stan Grant.
4	20 February 2023	Michelle Rowland	David Coleman		Imogen Senior Narelda Jacobs Jelena Dokic	Scams, Trolls, and Social Media; Hosted by Stan Grant.
5	27 February 2023	Pat Conroy	George Brandis		Vasyl Myroshnychenko Sarah McBride Sharan Burrow	Ukraine, Putin and Spies; Hosted by Stan Grant.
6	6 March 2023	Matt Thistlethwaite	Andrew Bragg		David Hare Teela Reid Pragya Agarwa	Words That Offend and Referendums; Hosted by Stan Grant.
7	13 March 2023	Josh Burns	Perin Davey		Billy Bragg Antoinette Lattouf	Billy Bragg on Q+A; Hosted by Stan Grant.
8	20 March 2023	Matt Keogh		Dai Le	Brian Greene Geoffrey Robertson Kirsten Banks	Hypotheticals about Politics and the Universe; Hosted by Stan Grant.
9	27 March 2023	Peter Malinauskas	Jacinta Nampijinpa Price	Jordon Steele-John	Richard V. Spencer	The Many Voices of The Voice; Hosted by Stan Grant.
10	3 April 2023	Amanda Rishworth	Greg Mirabella		Deni Todorovič Sara James Osman Faruqi	Politics and Why Representation Matters; Hosted by Stan Grant.
11	10 April 2023	Fatima Payman	Dimitry Chugg-Palmer		Andrew Neil Anne Pattel-Gray Kanishka Raffel	Faith, Politics & Humanity Hosted by Stan Grant
12	17 April 2023	Emma McBride	Michael McCormack	Bob Katter	Darlene Thomas John Williamson	Q+A live from Mildura with a closing performance by John Williamson Hosted by Stan Grant
13	24 April 2023	Tim Ayres	Paul Fletcher		Taylah Gray James Brown Sophie Howe	War, Space and the Future Hosted by Stan Grant (final episode as host after resigning in May 2023).
14	1 May 2023	Mark Butler	Bridget Archer		Anthony Dillon Sarah Churchwell Mukesh Haikerwal	Health, Privilege and Swearing Allegiance Hosted by David Speers
15	8 May 2023	Andrew Leigh	Caroline di Russo	Jacqui Lambie	Irvine Welsh Nova Peris	Cancel Culture, Cost-Of-Living & the Coronation Hosted by David Speers
