= Robert Oscar Lopez =

American academic

- Education: Yale University; University of Buffalo
- Occupation: Academic
- Employer: California State University, Northridge

Robert Oscar Lopez is an American former academic. He was most recently a professor of humanities at Southwestern Baptist Theological Seminary in Fort Worth, Texas.

== Early life ==
Robert Oscar Lopez is of Puerto Rican descent. Additionally, he is "the descendant of African slaves".

Lopez graduated from Yale University in 1993, where he received a bachelor of arts degree. He holds an English PhD from State University of New York at Buffalo. He received a master's degree in classics from SUNY-Buffalo in 2007.

== Career ==
Lopez joined the faculty at California State University, Northridge in 2008. He became a tenured associate professor of English and Classics in 2013. In July 2013, it was announced he would self-publish "Mean Gays" fiction books.

In 2012, he published the essay "Growing up with two Moms", detailing his experiences growing up as son of a lesbian couple. This resulted in an immediate backlash in blogs, with some calling it hate speech. He also ran a blog where he was accused of homophobia for comparing gay parents to slave owners and same-sex adoption to "the cultural genocide practices once used against blacks and Indians".

Lopez was accused by two former students for creating a discriminatory environment. In October 2015, the CSUN provost wrote a letter informing Lopez that he was accused of intimidating students. Meanwhile, Lopez accused another administrator of comparing an event he had organized at the Ronald Reagan Presidential Library to a "KKK camp". The event that he had organized at the library was actually the initial meeting of his International Children's Rights Institute, and photos of the event were used for the web site.

Lopez founded the International Children's Rights Institute in 2014, and he served as its president until it quietly shut down in early 2017. The institute's closure was followed by accusations that one of its members, Katy Faust, had illegally lobbied against gay marriage in Australia and Taiwan. He testified against same-sex marriage in Minnesota. He wrote an amicus curiae brief for the Supreme Court in the Obergefell vs. Hodges case about same-sex marriage.

In 2016, Lopez resigned his position at CSUN and later became Professor of Humanities at Southwestern Baptist Theological Seminary. In November 2019, according to Southwestern, Lopez's position was eliminated due to changing program needs of Scarborough College. However, Southwestern's decision was undergirded by Lopez's actions, which included failure to comply with basic administrative policies, being the subject of regular complaints from students and faculty colleagues, and, in the end, refusal to attend meetings with his supervisors. In contrast, Lopez claimed that Southwestern administrators fired him for his refusal to cut back on his rhetoric after having reprimanded him earlier for talking almost incessantly about homosexuality.

== Personal life ==
According to Inside Higher Ed, he "identifies as bisexual". He married to his wife, Mijeong Park, in 2001 and they have children. According to his wife's biography from the International Children's Rights Institute website, she is a specialist in Asian-American literature and Korean literature and film. Lopez is a member of the Southern Baptist Convention.

== Works ==
=== Books ===
- Jephthah's Daughters. The Innocent Casualties of Same-Sex Parenting, published 2016 by Wilberforce Publications.
- The Colorful Conservative: American Conversations with the Ancients from Wheatley to Whitman, published by Rowman & Littlefield in 2011.

=== Articles ===
- Bloom, In-Humanities and the Gay Marriage Regime 2015 in Humanum
- Growing up with two Moms 2012 in Public Discourse
- Protecting Human Rights for All in San Diego Union Tribune 2015
