= Cassandra Goldie =

Australian professor and philanthropist

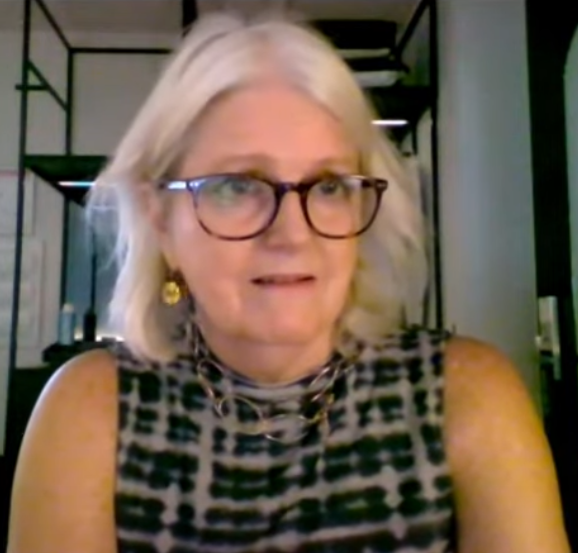
- In a 2024 panel discussion
- Education: University of New South Wales
- Occupations: CEO, adjunct professor
- Employer: University of New South Wales
- Known for: Australian Council of Social Service
- Title: Dr
- Board member of: Pinnacle Foundation
- Scientific career
- Thesis: Living in public space: a human rights wasteland?
- Website: www.kaldorcentre.unsw.edu.au/author/200

Cassandra Goldie AO is CEO of ACOSS, the Australian Council of Social Service, and an adjunct professor at the University of New South Wales.

== Early life and education ==
Goldie has both a PhD from University of New South Wales and as a Masters of Law, awarded from University College London.

== Career ==
Goldie has worked in the Australian Council of Social Service as CEO, since 2010. She was a representative of the Australian Climate Roundtable, as well as a consumer representative panel of the Energy Charter Independent Accountability Panel, in 2023.

Goldie was appointed adjunct professor at UNSW in 2018. Goldie worked in public policy, with expertise across economic and social issues, social justice, human rights as well as climate change for vulnerable populations, she has worked with disadvantaged people in national and international issues.

She was director of Sex and Age Discrimination with the Australian Human Rights Commission, as well as Senior Executive with Legal Aid in Western Australia.

She was also on a panel on Climate Change and Resilience Building for the Justice and Peace office, as part of a WWF-Australia and The Sydney Alliance event.

Goldie is also a member of Chief Executive Women.

== Media ==
Goldie has both published, and been cited numerous times in the media, with comments on climate change and social policy. She has commented on JobSeeker, the Youth Allowance, and Rent Assistance, with comment on the Federal Budget in 2023. Goldie commented that the community sector needs to speak out on stronger action to address climate change, which is impacting the cost of living, as well as accelerated damage to people's homes livelihoods, health, and employment.

Goldie's work on climate change has been published in The Guardian. She has also been on RN Drive on ABC Radio National, discussing impacts of climate change with the Energy Council.

== Recognition and awards ==
- 2012 – Women of Influence, Inaugural Westpac/ Australian Financial Review
- 2013 – BOSS True Leader, The Australian Financial Review
- 2015 – Pro Bono Impact 25 on the Social Economy
- 2018 – One of Australia's top 50 outstanding LGBTI Executives (Deloitte)
- 2021 – Impact 25 Most Influential People in the Social Economy, Pro Bono Australia
- 2021 – UNSW Alumni Award for Social Impact and Science
- 2023 – Officer of the Order of Australia, for "service to social justice through leadership and advocacy to promote the rights of people marginalised and disadvantaged in the community"
