= Mary-Louise McLaws =

Australian epidemiologist (1953–2023)

Mary-Louise McLaws AO
- Born: Mary-Louise Viney; 17 March 1953; Tasmania, Australia
- Died: 12 August 2023 (aged 70); Sydney, Australia
- Spouse: Richard Flook (m. 1988)
- Children: 2

Academic background
- Education: University of Sydney (BSc, DTPH, MPH, PhD)
- Thesis: Measurement and determinants of condom use behaviour in homosexually active men at risk of AIDS (1992)

Academic work
- Discipline: Epidemiology; infectious diseases
- Institutions: University of New South Wales (1992–2023)

Mary-Louise McLaws AO (née Viney; 17 March 1953 – 12 August 2023) was an Australian epidemiologist. Specialising in infectious diseases, she was a professor of epidemiology at the University of New South Wales for over 30 years. During the COVID-19 pandemic, she became a "household name" in Australia, regularly providing public information and advice on the disease.

== Early life ==
Mary-Louise McLaws was born in Tasmania on 17 March 1953, the daughter of Barry and Louise Viney. She and her elder brother spent their early years with their mother in Bondi, New South Wales, before moving to the Central Coast where she attended Gosford High School. She took the surname of her step-father Bruce McLaws. She was raised in a Jewish family.

McLaws attended the University of Sydney, graduating Bachelor of Science and later completing a diploma in tropical public health in 1984, Master of Public Health in 1988 and Doctor of Philosophy in 1992.

== Career ==
McLaws joined the University of New South Wales in 1992. During her career she "wrote more than 180 research papers and supervised and supported many PhD students for decades". She specialised in hospital-acquired infections. Her early research also included a 1995 study on HIV/AIDS in Australia, which examined women who had acquired HIV from their male sexual partners.

In 2004, McLaws was sent to Beijing for two months to monitor bird flu for the World Health Organization. She also consulted to Hong Kong's authorities during the 2002–2004 SARS outbreak.

McLaws became "widely known to the Australian public through her media appearances" during the COVID-19 pandemic in Australia. She was one of the first public advocates for mandatory face masks and the closure of the Australian border. She later advocated for mandatory vaccination, including the establishment of vaccination hubs to achieve herd immunity. In 2021 she was named by the Australian Financial Review as one of the ten "most culturally powerful people" in Australia during the year.

== Personal life ==
McLaws married Richard Flook in 1988, with whom she had a son and a daughter. She was diagnosed with brain cancer in January 2022, and died on 12 August 2023, at age 70.

== Honours ==
McLaws was appointed an Officer of the Order of Australia (AO) in the 2022 Queen's Birthday Honours, for "distinguished service to medical research, particularly to epidemiology and infection prevention, to tertiary education, and to health administration". In June 2023, the NSW Jewish Board of Deputies hosted a reception in her honour at Emanuel Synagogue.
