= Holly Ransom =

Australian author and public speaker

- Born: 7 February 1990 (age 36); Perth, Western Australia
- Education: Bachelor of Arts (Economics), Bachelor of Laws, Master of Public Policy
- Alma mater: University of Western Australia, Harvard Kennedy School
- Occupation: Social entrepreneur
- Years active: 2012–present
- Organization: Emergent
- Title: Western Australia Finalist, Young Australian of the Year
- Term: 2013
- Predecessor: David Pocock
- Successor: John van Bockxmeer
- Board member of: Port Adelaide Football Club
- Website: hollyransom.com

Holly Ransom (born 7 February 1990) is an Australian public speaker, author and content curator. She is the founder of Emergent, her public speaking company, where she engages and presents to organizations on disruptive strategy. She is also a director of Port Adelaide Football Club and a trustee of The Prince's Charities Australia.

== Career ==
In 2012 Westpac and Australian Financial Review named her one of Australia's 100 Women of Influence. She was co-chair of the 2014 Y20 Youth Summit.

Ransom became the youngest board member in Port Adelaide history, when her appointment was announced in 2016.

In 2017, she was Sir Richard Branson's nominee for Wired's 'Smart List' of 'future game changers to watch'.

Ransom has appeared as a regular panelist on the ABC programs Q&A and The Drum. In 2018, she interviewed former US president Barack Obama. In 2019, she was awarded the Anne Wexler Fulbright Scholarship. In recognition of her contribution to community, the US Embassy awarded her the 2019 Eleanor Roosevelt Leadership Award, while Women & Leadership Australia named her the winner of the 2019 Victorian Excellence in Women's Leadership Award.

Ransom's first book The Leading Edge was published by Penguin on 20 July 2021. She also serves as Pride Cup chair, and was a member on the steering committee for Port Adelaide's AFLW team, scheduled to make its competitive debut in late 2022.
