= Madonna King =

Australian journalist, author and media commentator

Madonna King is an Australian journalist, author and media commentator.

From 2006 until 2011, King presented Mornings on ABC Radio Brisbane.

As an author, King has published several books, including the biographies of notable Australians Ian Frazer, Joe Hockey and Maxine Horne. She has also co-authored a book about the Bali Nine.

In 2018, Queensland premier Annastacia Palaszczuk appointed King as chairwoman of the Queensland Government's fledgling anti-bullying taskforce, established in the wake of the suicide of teenage cyberbullying victim Amy "Dolly" Everett.

== Works ==
In addition to biographies, King has written a series of books for young adults:

- King, Madonna (28 March 2017), Being 14, Hachette Australia, ISBN 978-0-7336-3709-4
- King, Madonna (25 February 2020), Fathers and daughters : helping girls and their dads build unbreakable bonds, Hachette Australia, ISBN 978-0-7336-4020-9
- King, Madonna (6 September 2022), Ten-ager, Hachette Australia, ISBN 978-0-7336-4609-6
- King, Madonna (June 2022), L platers, Hachette Australia, ISBN 978-0-7336-4868-7
