= Michael J. Biercuk =

Australian academic

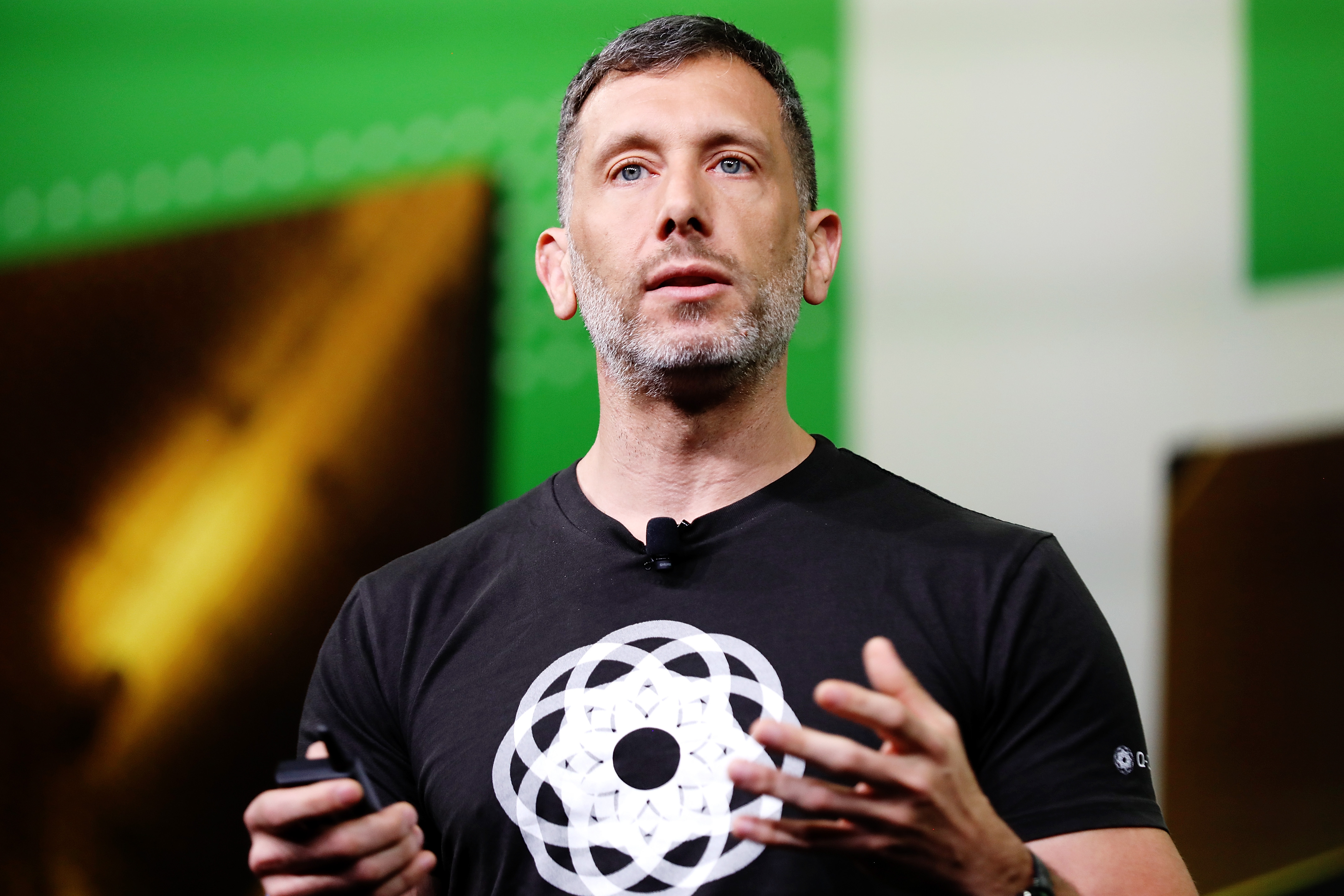
- Biercuk in 2022
- Born: 1978 or 1979 (age 46–47); New York City, US
- Education: University of Pennsylvania; Harvard University
- Awards: Eureka Prize
- Scientific career
- Fields: Quantum physics Quantum technology
- Workplaces: University of Sydney

Michael J. Biercuk (born 1978 or 1979) is Professor of Quantum Physics and Quantum technology at the University of Sydney, and the CEO and Founder of Q-CTRL, a venture-capital-backed quantum technology company. In his academic role he is a Chief Investigator in the Australian Research Council Centre of Excellence for Engineered Quantum Systems.

He held a research fellowship in the Ion Storage Group at NIST, Boulder and has served as a full-time technical consultant to DARPA, helping to steer government investments in quantum information advanced computer architectures. Biercuk is a TEDx speaking alumnus, winner of the 2015 Australian Museum Eureka Prize for Outstanding Early Career Researcher and the 2011 NMI prize for excellence in measurement science.

== Early life ==
Biercuk was born and raised in New York City. He earned his undergraduate degree in Physics from the University of Pennsylvania, and his Master’s and Doctorate degrees from Harvard University. He moved to Australia in 2010.

== Career and research ==
=== Current activities ===
Biercuk’s research is focused on a field called quantum control – learning how to put exotic systems obeying the laws of quantum physics to work for the creation of new technologies. He is an experimentalist, developing and testing new quantum control techniques using quantum computing hardware built from trapped atomic ions.

As the Director of the Quantum Control Laboratory at the University of Sydney’s Nanoscience Hub, Biercuk is using tools such as superposition (single particles in two states at once) and entanglement (two particles inextricably linked at a distance) in control and measurement technology. His team is funded by US Agencies IARPA and the U.S. Army Research Office, as well as the Australian Research Council.

In 2017 Biercuk launched, Q-CTRL, a company provide solutions to stabilise quantum technologies, and the first spin-off company from the University of Sydney’s Quantum Science Group. Biercuk is the CEO of Q-CTRL.

Q-CTRL has attracted investments from firms including Main Sequence Ventures, Sequoia Capital and other venture capital firms. In April 2018, Q-CTRL was named as the only emerging company outside of the US and Canada to be included in IBM's hand-picked network of companies working to advance quantum computing and explore practical applications in business and science. In December 2018, Q-CTRL launched its first product, Black Opal, to the market. The software brings a friendly user interface to the quantum domain, delivered via a hardware-agnostic SaaS model.

=== Past experience ===
==== NIST Boulder ====
From 2010 to 2018 Biercuk was a research fellow in the Storage Group at NIST, Boulder, working with 2012 Nobel Laureate Dr David J. Wineland. Biercuk’s research focused on quantum control and quantum simulation in a Penning Ion Trap.

==== DARPA ====
From 2005-2008 Biercuk served as a full-time technical consultant to DARPA. At DARPA, he advised on strategic technological investments in quantum technology and advanced microprocessor architecture. While at DARPA, Biercuk contributed to an effort aimed at the realization of novel computer architectures enabled by high-bandwidth, low-power, on-chip photonic networks. This work gave rise to two DARPA programs led by Dr. Jagdeep Shah, UNIC and APS, both aiming to enable radically new processor architectures and capabilities by restoring a balance in system-level computational throughput and on/off-chip communications bandwidth.

== Recognitions and awards ==
- NMI Prize for Excellence in Measurement Science by National Measurement Institute, Australia (Winner, 2011)
- Sydney Morning Herald, Sydney's 100 Most Influential People (2012)
- Research selected #8 "World-changing" experiment by BBC Focus (2012)
- Eureka Prize for Innovation in Computer Science (Finalist, 2012)
- Australian Museum Eureka Award for Outstanding Early Career Researcher (Winner, 2015)
- 2015 Prime Minister’s Malcolm McIntosh Prize for Physical Scientist of the Year (Finalist)
