= Gigi Foster =

Australian economist

Gigi Foster is a U.S. born academic and economist. She is currently a professor of economics at the University of New South Wales.

She regularly appears in the Australian media on the topic of economics, having been a panellist on discussion television show Q&A and host of a radio show on the ABC.

== Education ==
Foster received a Bachelor of Arts (Ethics, Politics, and Economics) from Yale University, and completed a PhD in economics at the University of Maryland.

== Career ==
=== Podcast ===
Foster hosts The Economists on the ABC with Australian economics journalist Peter Martin.

=== COVID-19 ===
Foster has criticised the COVID Zero-centred approach adopted by Victoria and other jurisdictions within Australia, believing that the costs to the economy outweighed the potential benefits of reducing case numbers. Her employer the University of New South Wales distanced themselves from her comments which were televised during the show Q&A.

== Accomplishments ==
Gigi Foster was named Young Economist of The Year for 2019 by the Economics Society of Australia.

== Publications ==
- Coelli, M., Foster, G. and Leigh, A. (2018), Do School Principals Respond to Increased Public Scrutiny? New Survey Evidence from Australia. Econ Rec, 94: 73–101. doi.org/10.1111/1475-4932.12400
- Foster G, 2019, Biophysical measurement in experimental social science research: Theory and practice, doi.org/10.1016/C2016-0-04236-5
- Frijters P; Foster G, 2013, An Economic Theory of Greed, Love, Groups, and Networks, Cambridge University Press, doi.org/10.1017/CBO9781139207041
- Foster G, 2019, 'Conclusion', in Biophysical Measurement in Experimental Social Science Research: Theory and Practice, pp. 267 – 277, doi.org/10.1016/B978-0-12-813092-6.00010-1
- Foster G; Frijters P, 2017, 'Behavioral Political Economy', in Routledge Handbook of Behavioral Economics, Routledge, pp. 348 – 364, doi.org/10.4324/9781315743479
- Kalenkoski CM; Foster G, 2016, 'Introduction: The Economics of Multitasking', in The Economics of Multitasking, Palgrave Macmillan US, pp. 1 – 5, doi.org/10.1057/9781137381446_1
- Foster G, 2016, 'Grading Standards in Higher Education: Trends, Context, and Prognosis', in Bretag T (ed.), Handbook of Academic Integrity, Springer, pp. 307 – 324, doi.org/10.1007/978-981-287-098-8_48
- Kalenkoski CM; Foster G, 2016, 'Discussion: The economics of multitasking', in Kalenkoski C; Foster G (ed.), The Economics of Multitasking, Palgrave Macmillan, pp. 203 – 208, doi.org/10.1057/9781137381446
- Foster G, 2015, 'Experimental Economics', in Wright J (ed.), International Encyclopedia of the Social & Behavioral Sciences, Elsevier, pp. 546 – 551, doi.org/10.1016/B978-0-08-097086-8.71052-X
- Foster G, 2015, 'Grading Standards in Higher Education: Trends, Context, and Prognosis', Handbook of Academic Integrity, Springer Singapore, pp. 1 – 14, doi.org/10.1007/978-981-287-079-7_48-2
- Frijters P; Foster G, 'Is it rational to be in love?', in, Edward Elgar Publishing, pp. 205 – 232, doi.org/10.4337/9781782549598.00020
