= Vicky Xu =

Australian journalist

- 许微其
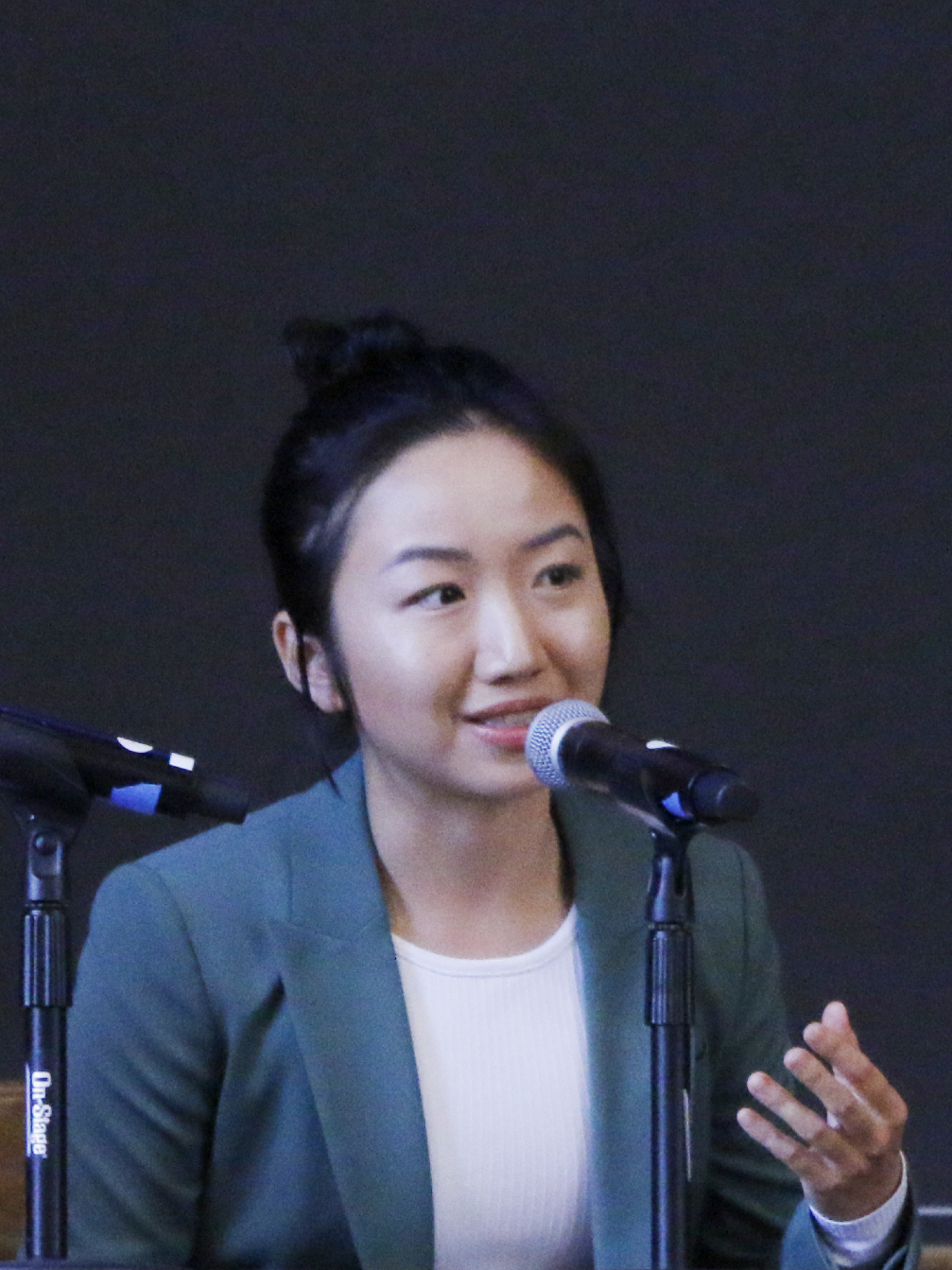
- Born: 许秀中 (Xǔ Xiùzhōng); October 19, 1994 (age 32); Jiayuguan City, Gansu, China
- Occupations: Journalist, Policy Analyst

Academic background
- Education: University of Melbourne (BA)

Academic work
- Institutions: Australian Strategic Policy Institute
- Main interests: Human rights in China
- Notable works: Uyghurs for Sale (2020)

Vicky Xu (Chinese: 许微其; pinyin: Xǔ Wēiqí; born 1994), previously known as Vicky Xiuzhong Xu (Chinese: 许秀中; pinyin: Xǔ Xiùzhōng), is a China-born Australian journalist and writer. She is known for her investigative journalism on human rights in China, particularly for her 2020 report, Uyghurs for Sale, which examined state-sponsored Uyghur forced labor affecting global supply chains. The report has been cited by various media outlets, legislators, and legal authorities in Australia, the United States, and Europe.

Xu has served as a Senior Fellow at the Australian Strategic Policy Institute and previously worked as a journalist for The New York Times. She regularly appears on international television and radio as a China expert and commentator. In 2020, Xu participated in a rare debate on Australian national television with Xining Wang, then Deputy Head of Mission at the Chinese Embassy in Australia. This debate marked the first recorded live exchange between a senior Chinese government representative and a Chinese citizen. Xu has since renounced her Chinese citizenship.

In 2021, the Chinese government initiated a transnational repression campaign against Xu, involving the prolonged interrogation of a close friend, and a propaganda campaign. Chinese state media referred to her as a "race traitor" and a "witch". In 2023, Xu revealed during an Australian parliamentary inquiry that the state persecution had damaged her connections with family and friends in China. In 2024, she disclosed to the media that she had moved to Taipei and taken up mixed martial arts.

== Early life ==
Xu was born in Jiayuguan City, Gansu Province, China. Her birth name, "Xiuzhong," reflects her parents' aspiration for their daughter to be "beautiful on the outside, and intelligent on the inside." Xu's upbringing saw her parents making substantial investments in her education, including paying for violin, English, and Olympic mathematics lessons.

Xu ranked first in her city on the high school entrance exam and earned a bronze medal in Gansu Province's Olympiad mathematics competition. She studied English broadcasting at the Communication University of China in Beijing, following an examination.

During a 2014 gap year, Xu taught Mandarin at a high school in Perth, Australia. While there, she encountered Mike Chinoy's documentary on the 1989 Tiananmen Square protests and massacre, a subject censored in China. This revelation prompted her to reevaluate her previous views on Chinese politics.

Instead of returning to Beijing, Xu pursued a degree in political science at the University of Melbourne. She also completed a six-month exchange semester at the Hebrew University of Jerusalem, where she interned at the Truman Institute. Her academic and journalistic experiences, including interviews with Chinese dissidents such as Wu Lebao, shaped her perspectives.

== Career ==
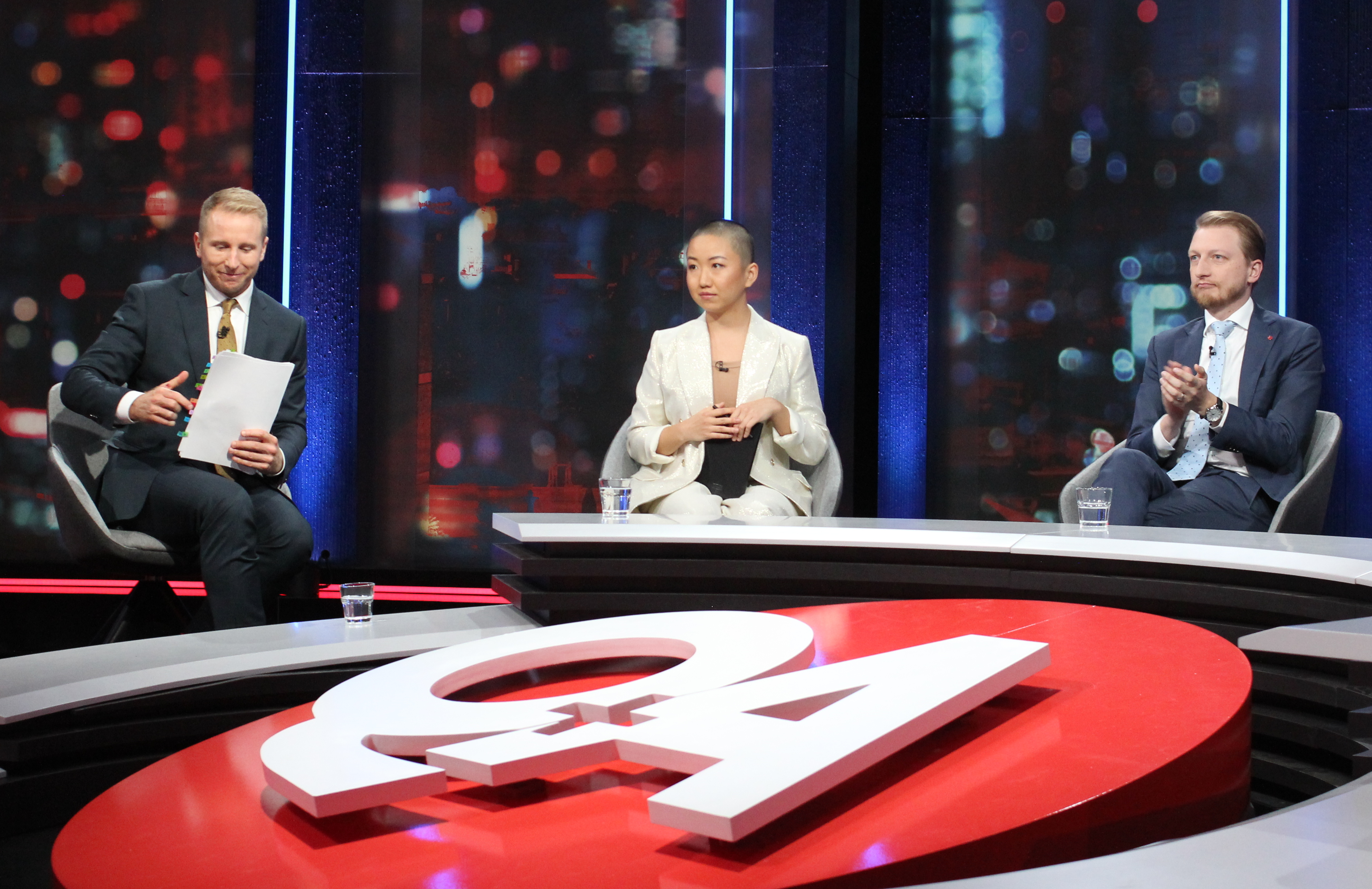
Xu appearing on ABC's Q+A in 2021

Xu began her journalism career as a freelancer for The New York Times in her second year at the University of Melbourne. After graduating, she worked for the Australian Broadcasting Corporation, The New York Times, and the Australian Strategic Policy Institute. Her reporting has covered a range of topics, including geopolitics, business, human rights issues, Australian current affairs, and global supply chains.

In March 2020, Xu and her team at the Australian Strategic Policy Institute published the report Uyghurs for Sale, which documented evidence showing that Chinese authorities displacing Uyghur people from Xinjiang to other regions in China, then using them as forced labor to manufacture goods for global brands such as Adidas, Apple, BMW and Nike. The report was widely cited by US government agencies, European and Australian parliaments, and various civil society organizations, all of which expressed concerns over China's treatment of ethnic and religious minorities.

In addition to her journalism career, Xu has performed stand-up comedy. In 2019, she collaborated with The Chaser comedy group to sell out a show in Sydney. In 2024, Xu participated in a one-off comedy event in Melbourne alongside Cheng Lei, an Australian journalist who had been detained in China. Xu has also appeared on comedy skits produced by Australia's national broadcaster ABC.

In January 2021, Xu's memoir You're So Brave was announced for publication by Allen & Unwin.

=== Chinese state persecution ===
By 2019, Xu and her family faced harassment and threats due to her journalism.

In April 2021, Chinese state media launched a smear campaign against her. China Daily labeled Xu as a "traitor," "anti-China witch," and "a pawn in the Western anti-China plot".

By June 2024, Xu had relocated to Taipei and reported ongoing surveillance and intimidation by Chinese security forces. She also changed her name from Xu Xiuzhong to Xu Weiqi and took up training and competing in mixed martial arts in Taiwan.

In July 2024, the Australian Federal Police reported to the Senate that they had thwarted a foreign intelligence plot targeting Xu and activist Drew Pavlou, who were considered "potential targets of violence."
