= Satyajit Das =

Australian banker, corporate treasurer, consultant and author

- Born: 1957 (age 68–69); Calcutta, West Bengal, India
- Education: University of New South Wales; Australian Graduate School of Management
- Occupations: Banker; Corporate Treasurer; Financial commentator Writer
- Known for: financial commentary

Satyajit Das (born 1957) is an Australian former banker and corporate treasurer, turned consultant, and author.

== Early life and education ==
Satyajit Das was born in Calcutta, India in 1957. His family emigrated to Australia when he was 12.

Das received bachelor's degrees in Commerce and Law from the University of New South Wales followed by an MBA from the Australian Graduate School of Management.

== Career ==
From 1977 to 1987, Das worked in banking with the Commonwealth Bank, CitiGroup, and Merrill Lynch. From 1988 to 1994, Das was Treasurer of the TNT Transport Group.

Das is the author of Traders, Guns & Money, Extreme Money, and reference books on derivatives and risk management. He lives in Sydney.

Extreme Money was long-listed for the Financial Times/Goldman Sachs Business Book of the Year Award. The Economist reviewed the book, stating that "Satyajit Das is well-placed to comment, having worked both for investment banks and as a consultant advising clients on their use of complex financial products"; however "the book could have easily been 150 pages shorter without losing its thrust".

A Banquet of Consequences was released in Australia in 2015. In 2016 it was released in the United States and India as The Age of Stagnation "to increase confusion and avoid it being mistaken for a cookbook".

Das is a regular commentator on Late Night Live on Radio National, hosted by Phillip Adams.

== Selected publications ==
- Das, Satyajit (1994). Swaps and Financial Derivatives: the global reference to products, pricing, applications and markets (Second ed.). Law Book Company. ISBN 0455211906.
- Das, Satyajit (2004). Swaps/Financial Derivatives: products, pricing, applications and risk management (Third ed.). Wiley. ISBN 0470821094.
- Das, Satyajit (2005). Derivative Products and Pricing: The Das Swaps and Financial Derivatives Library (Third ed.). Wiley. ISBN 9780470821640.
- Das, Satyajit; Jade Novakovic (2006). In Search of the Pangolin - Eco-travel Tales. New Holland Publishers Ltd. ISBN 9781845372590.
- Das, Satyajit (2006). Traders, Guns & Money: Knowns and Unknowns in the Dazzling World of Derivatives. FT Press. ISBN 9780273731962.
- Das, Satyajit (2011). Extreme Money: Masters of the Universe and the Cult of Risk. Ft Press. ISBN 9780132790079.
- Das, Satyajit (2015). A Banquet of Consequences: Have We Consumed Our Own Future?. Penguin Books Australia. ISBN 9780670079056.
- Das, Satyajit (2016). The Age of Stagnation: Why Perpetual Growth is Unattainable and the Global Economy is in Peril. Prometheus Books. ISBN 9781633881587.
