= Lenore Taylor =

Australian journalist

Lenore Taylor is an Australian journalist. She was the editor of Guardian Australia from May 2016 to February 2026.

Raised in Brisbane, Taylor attended Brisbane Girls Grammar School and studied journalism and politics at the University of Queensland, where she was co-editor of the student newspaper Semper Floreat. She began working as a journalist in 1987 at The Canberra Times. She was later national affairs correspondent and then chief political correspondent at The Sydney Morning Herald, before becoming Guardian Australia's first political editor from 2013 to 2016.

She has won the "Scoop of the Year" Walkley Award twice: in 2010, for her reporting on the Rudd government's shelving of an emissions trading scheme, and in 2014, for a joint report on Australian spying on the Indonesian government. She also won the 2014 Paul Lyneham Award for excellence in journalism and the Federal Parliamentary Press Gallery Journalist of the Year in 2007 and 2014.

Taylor published her first book, Shitstorm: Inside Labor's Darkest Days (about Kevin Rudd's first term as Prime Minister) in 2010.

She is married to author and journalist Paul Daley.

Taylor resigned as editor of Guardian Australia.
