= Kavita Naidu =

Fijian lawyer

Kavita Naidu is a Fijian international human rights lawyer known for her work on climate change, refugee and criminal law.

== Early life and education ==
Naidu is from Fiji. She has a master's degree in law with specialization in human rights and international law.

== Career ==
Naidu practices law in Australia, New Zealand, and Fiji.

Her clients include the United Nations Office of the High Commissioner of Human Rights in Fiji, the Pacific Islands Forum Secretariat in Fiji, the Director of Public Prosecutions (New South Wales) in Australia, Attorney General's Chambers of Fiji, and Oxfam Australia.

She was previously the climate justice programme officer for the Asia Pacific Forum On Women, Law And Development, in Thailand.

She serves on the board of directors of Greenpeace Australia and has been critical of the government of Australia's climate policy. In 2021 she accused Australia of failing to sufficiently address climate change.

Naidu is an advocate for climate justice with a feminist perspective and works to uplift women and communities affected by crises and conflict.

=== Selected publications ===
- Naomi Joy Godden, Pam Macnish, Trimita Chakma & Kavita Naidu, (2020), Feminist Participatory Action Research as a tool for climate justice, Gender & Development, 28:3, 593–615, DOI: 10.1080/13552074.2020.1842040
