= Heather Ridout =

Australian businessperson (born 1954)

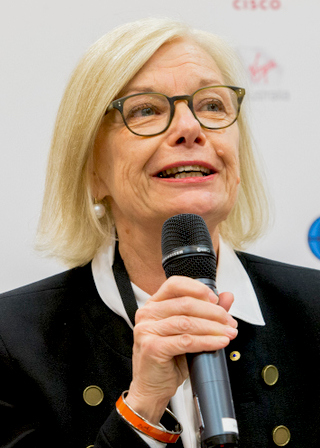
Ridout in 2015

Heather Ridout AO (born 1954, Deniliquin) is an Australian businesswoman who previously served as the Chief Executive of the Australian Industry Group.

Born in Deniliquin in south-western New South Wales, she later attended the University of Sydney. She is a member of several policy-setting and advice-giving groups including Skills Australia. Heather Ridout was also a member of the Henry Tax Review and chaired the Productivity and Prosperity Advisory Panel of the Population Strategy Task Force.

Heather Ridout has various other appointments including Director of the Australian Super Trustee Board and the Australian Research Alliance for Children and Youth. She member of the board of the Climate Change Authority.

In her former role with Ai Group, Ridout had a vigorous media presence, appearing on Network 10's Meet the Press programme, the ABC's Lateline and Q&A programmes, and various other radio and television shows. In November 2011, Ridout gave a televised address to the National Press Club of Australia on the choices Australia faces and challenges we need to confront to create a positive agenda and a positive future for the nation.

Ridout was made an Officer (AO) in the General Division of the Order of Australia on 10 June 2013.

In December 2022, Ridout was announced as the next Australian Consul-General in New York, succeeding Nick Greiner.
