= Miriam Lyons =

Australian policy analyst

- Born: Bowral, New South Wales
- Education: University of New South Wales
- Known for: Public speaking on Australian politics

Miriam Lyons is an Australian policy analyst, writer and commentator.

== Career ==
Miriam Lyons was co-founder, with John Menadue, the founding executive director of the Centre for Policy Development, a public policy think tank set up in 2007.

She has been profiled in The Australian Financial Review's Boss Magazine, and The Australian.

Lyons left her role as executive director of the CPD in January 2014, and is a fellow of the organisation.

She co-authored, with Ian McAuley, Governomics, published by Melbourne University Press in May 2015. It was reviewed in The Mandarin.

Lyons is a climate campaigner with the activist organisation GetUp!.

== Recognition ==
Lyons was named as one of Time Out Sydney's "Forty Under 40" in 2016.
