= Toby Ralph =

Australian public relations consultant

Toby Ralph is an Australian public relations consultant, an expert on election strategy.

== History ==
Ralph has been a regular panelist on Gruen Planet and guest on Radio National programs Q+A and Late Night Live.

He was included in a BRW list of "most influential people in Australian business".

He is a regular columnist for the Australian opinion magazine Crikey and The Australian newspaper.

== Publications ==
Ralph published his experiences with a UN team monitoring the 2009 presidential elections in Afghanistan.

- Ralph, Toby (2012) Ballots, Bullets & Kabulshit: An Afghan Election Penguin eBooks ISBN 9781742537108
