= Anne Tiernan =

Anne Tiernan is from Brisbane, Queensland, Australia. She is a writer, educator, political scientist, and consultant in areas of public administration, public policy and research analysis. She is known for her research expertise in policy and has presented at conferences both nationally and internationally. She has a regular weekly radio slot on 'Weekends with Tim Cox' on 612 ABC Brisbane. Tiernan is currently a professor at the Centre for Governance and Public Policy at Griffith University and fellow of Australia and New Zealand School of Government (ANZSOG).

== Education ==
Tiernan attended high school at St Rita's College, Clayfield, and studied politics and government at Griffith University.

== Career ==
Tiernan began her career working in government both at a Commonwealth and Queensland level in both consultancy and teaching capacities. Some of her roles have included commissioner at the Queensland Crime and Corruption Commission, and member of the board of commissioners of the Queensland Public Service Commission. From 2013 to 2015 Tiernan was a member of the board of directors, St Rita's College. She was appointed professor of Australian government and politics at the University of Melbourne between July 2015 and November 2016. She was the founding director of the Griffith University Policy Innovation Hub. She is dean of the Griffith University Business School.

Tiernan appeared at an event for the 2017 Brisbane Writers Festival in Brisbane, Queensland.

=== Roles and membership ===
- Institute of Public Administration Australia, national fellow
- ANZSOG fellow
- Queensland Independent Remuneration Tribunal, chair
- Crime and Corruption Commission, ordinary commissioner
- Museum of Australian Democracy, Old Parliament House, member of the board

=== Books ===
- The Gatekeepers: Lessons from Prime Ministers' Chiefs of Staff (both with R.A.W. Rhodes, MUP 2014), which included information about 11 former chiefs of staff
- Lessons in Governing: A Profile of Prime Ministers’ Chiefs of Staff
- Learning to be a Minister: Heroic Expectations, Practical Realities (with Patrick Weller, MUP 2010)
- Caretaker Conventions in Australasia: Minding the Shop for Government (ANU Press 2014) (with Jennifer Menzies)
- Oxford Handbook of Australian Politics Editor (OUP, 2020)

=== Selected articles ===
- Tiernan, A. (2015). The dilemmas of organisational capacity. Policy and Society, 34(3), 209–217.
- Rhodes, R. A. W., & Tiernan, A. (2015). Focus groups and prime ministers’ chiefs of staff. Journal of Organizational Ethnography, 4(2), 208–222.
- Dickinson, H., Katsonis, M., Kay, A., O'Flynn, J., & Tiernan, A. (2015). Looking to the Past and the Future of the Australian Journal of Public Administration. Australian Journal of Public Administration, 74(1), 1–4.
- Tiernan, A. (2015). Craft and Capacity in the Public Service. Australian Journal of Public Administration, 74(1), 53–62.
- Tiernan, A. (2015). Reforming Australia's Federal Framework: Priorities and Prospects. Australian Journal of Public Administration, 74(4), 398–405.
- Rhodes, R. A. W., & Tiernan, A. (2014). Prime Ministers’ Chiefs of Staff: Coping with wild treachery and weirdness. In D. Alexander and J. Lewis (eds), Making Public Policy Decisions: Expertise, skills and experience. Abingdon, Oxon: Routledge, p. 146-165.
- Tiernan, A. & Menzies, J. (2015). Caretaker Conventions. In B. Galligan, B. & S. Brenton (eds), Constitutional Conventions in Westminster Systems: Controversies, Changes and Challenges. Cambridge: Cambridge University Press, p. 91-115.
