= Leyla Acaroglu =

Australian sustainability strategist

- Born: Melbourne, Victoria, Australia
- Education: RMIT University (PhD)
- Occupations: Designer educator author
- Awards: UNEP Champion of the Earth (2016)

Leyla Acaroglu is an Australian designer, sustainability innovator, and educator. She is the founder of two design agencies, Disrupt Design and Eco Innovators. She also founded the UnSchool, a pop-up program that disrupts the mainstream way that knowledge is gained and shared; the program won the Core77 Design Education Initiative Award.

Acaroglu developed the Disruptive Design Method, which is the backbone of her unique approach to design-led social change. In 2016, she was named the UNEP Champion of the Earth through the United Nations Environment Programme for her actions which have had a transformative and positive impact on the environment.

== Education ==
For her undergraduate education, Acaroglu first was admitted to design school. After she found out about the harsh impact that the design industry had on waste, she quit design school. She then began to pursue a social science degree in environmental sustainability, foreshadowing her career as a sustainability advocate. She later received a PhD through the Department of Architecture and Design at RMIT, in Melbourne, Australia.

== Awards and acknowledgments ==
- 2005, UNEP Pathfinder Award, United Nations Environment Programme
- 2007, Patricia Guthrie Memorial Award, RMIT University
- 2010, Melbourne Design Award, DIA
  - Won for the animation "Life Pscycle-ology”
- 2011, Finalist in the 2011 Melbourne Awards by the City of Melbourne
- 2012, Melbourne Design Award, Melbourne Design Awards
  - Won for the "Un-Waste Bookcase”
- 2012, CORE77 Design Award, Design Education Award
- 2016, UNEP Champion of the Earth, United Nations Environment Programme

== Published works ==
In 2016, Acaroglu was a keynote speaker in a TED (conference) in Long Beach, California. Her TED Talk "Paper beats plastic? How to rethink environmental folklore" has been watched over 1 million times, deeming it as one of the top talks within the realm of environmental sustainability. Other notable presentations include her talks at Google, "Disrupting the Status Quo by Design" and for the United Nations Environment Programme entitled "Innovation Conversations: Inclusive design for Social Change" and her "Champion of the Earth" presentation.

As an educator, Acaroglu has published many videos and original animation through an interactive format. "The Secret Life of Things" was a short animated series, aiming to promote life-cycle thinking and environmentally conscious decision making within the industries of design and product development. In 2010, the first installment of the series, entitled "Life Pscycle-ology", won the Melbourne Design Award for its confrontation regarding the issue of hidden environmental impacts of common materials.

In 2014, Acaroglu published two books: "The Good Design Guide" (co-authored) and "MAKE CHANGE: A Handbook for Creative Rebels and Change Agents". Later in 2015, Acaroglu published an article where she narrated her new realized passion for making the design industry more eco-friendly, entitled "Why I Quit Design School".

== Projects and exhibitions ==
From February 2010 to July 2011, she ran the "Repair Workshops" project. Over the course of five days, 10 participants explored how damaged or broken items could be used for reinvention. Over the course of this exhibition, 2.5 tons of waste was saved. Afterward, she ran another interactive exhibition from July 2011 to December 2011 entitled "How Ethical is your Home?". It focused on social, ethical and environmental impacts that are generated through our homes. The next year, Acaroglu collaboratively developed the "UnWaste Bookcase" which emphasized the interaction between disciplines of architecture, furniture and innovation. Since its creation, the bookcase has been featured in design magazines including Artichoke and Green Magazine. The project was awarded the 2012 Melbourne design Award, and was nominated for an IDEA award.

Acaroglu has designed numerous interactive products that are aimed to educate the consumer on social and environmental change. Such products include the Designercise Ideation Toolkit, Game Changer Game, Design Play Cards and the Eco Innovators Mythbusting Sustainability Quiz app. Most notably, the Design Play Cards won the CORE77 Design Education Award in 2013.
