= Katy Faust =

American Christian activist and author (born 1976)

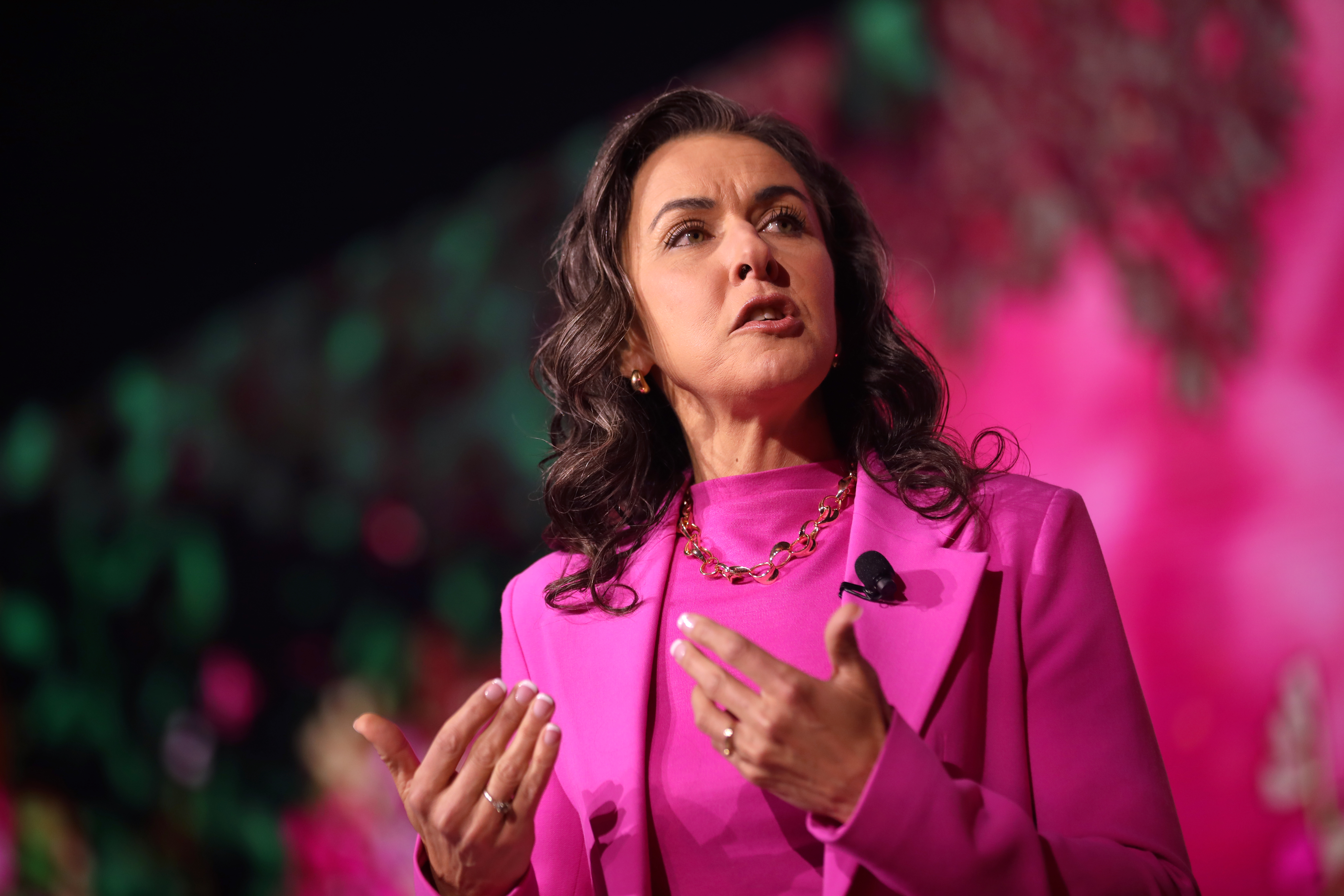
Katy Faust speaks at Turning Point USA's 2024 Young Women's Leadership Summit

Katy Faust (born 1976) is an American Christian activist, author, and public speaker based in Seattle, Washington. She is the founder and president of Them Before Us, a nonprofit advocacy organization that argues same-sex couples should not be allowed to be parents. She is a leading figure in the Greater Than Campaign, a coalition of approximately 100 organizations that seeks to overturn the Supreme Court's 2015 ruling in Obergefell v. Hodges, which established a constitutional right to same-sex marriage in the United States.

== Career ==
=== Early activism ===
Faust began her public activism in 2012 with an anonymous blog called Ask the Bigot, in which she wrote about same-sex marriage and parenting from a conservative Christian perspective. She subsequently joined the International Children's Rights Institute, through which she traveled to Taiwan in late 2016 to lobby against marriage equality legislation there. She filed an amicus curiae brief in Obergefell v. Hodges before the Supreme Court in 2015. Karen Loewy, senior counsel with Lambda Legal, has noted that arguments Faust made in that brief have since been synthesized in her current advocacy.

=== Them Before Us ===
In 2017, Faust founded Them Before Us, a nonprofit organization whose stated mission is to prioritize children's interests in policy debates over same-sex marriage, surrogacy, in vitro fertilization, and divorce. She serves as its president. Faust is a regular contributor to the magazine World. Faust's first hire at Them Before Us was Utah activist Mary Summerhays. Summerhays had previously been criticized for child exploitation by using photos of the children of gay couples in her propaganda.

=== Greater Than Campaign ===
Faust is a prominent figure in the Greater Than Campaign, an umbrella organization of approximately 100 groups and individuals that opposes same-sex marriage and seeks to overturn Obergefell v. Hodges. She appeared in the campaign's launch video alongside representatives of the Heritage Foundation and the Southern Baptist Convention. In September 2025, she spoke at the National Conservatism Conference.

=== Public speaking and media ===
Faust is a frequent public speaker in the United States and internationally. She has been interviewed by LGBTQ Nation, by a former deputy prime minister of Australia, and by conservative European media outlets. She has also appeared as a guest on numerous podcasts.

== Personal life ==
Faust was born in Portland, Oregon. Her parents divorced when she was 10 years old. Her mother later entered a relationship with a woman; Faust has described that woman as a friend but not a parental figure, and has said she maintained her relationship with her father, who died in 2015. She had stated earlier in her campaign that he was absent from her life, and that she was raised by her mother and her mother's partner.

After graduating from St. Olaf College in Northfield, Minnesota, Faust spent a year in Taiwan on a Fulbright scholarship. She is married to Ryan Faust, who was the pastor of Grace Church in West Seattle for 14 years and is now a Navy chaplain.

Katy has an adopted son.
