= Gold Walkley =

One of the Walkley Awards for Australian journalism

The Gold Walkley is the major award of the Walkley Awards for Australian journalism. It is chosen by the Walkley Advisory Board from the winners of all the other categories (excluding the Journalism Leadership and Most Outstanding Contribution to Journalism awards). It has been awarded annually since 1978.

== List of award winners ==
Order	Year	Recipient(s)	Program / Title	Location / Publisher	Story / Issue	Reference
1.	1978	Catherine Martin	The West Australian	Perth	The impact of asbestos–related diseases on the mining community in Wittenoom Gorge	
2.	1979	Ron Tandberg	The Age	Melbourne	Cartoon: The public and the real Malcolm Fraser	
3.	1980	Leslie Grant Heading	ABC	Hobart	1980 Ash Wednesday bushfires	
4.	1981	John Lewis	Newcastle Herald	Newcastle	Attempted takeover of NBN Television.	
5.	1982	Kerry O'Brien	ATN Channel 7	Sydney	Circle of Poison, an investigation into adverse health affects arising from the usage of popular chemicals in Australia	
6.	1983	Mary Delahunty and Alan Hall	Four Corners	ABC TV		
7.	1984	Jan Mayman	The Age	Melbourne (freelance)	Death of John Pat, a 16-year-old Aboriginal Australian youth who died in police custody	
8.	1985	Chris Masters and Bruce Belsham	Four Corners	ABC TV	Sinking of the Rainbow Warrior	
9.	1986	Ron Tandberg	The Age	Melbourne	Cartoon highlighting the demarcation dispute between Bob Hawke and Paul Keating	
10.	1987	Phil Dickie	The Courier-Mail	Brisbane	Corruption in the Queensland Police Service which led to the Fitzgerald Inquiry	
11.	1988	Norman Swan	Radio National	ABC Radio	Allegations of scientific misconduct against Foundation 41 founder William McBride	
12.	1989	Alan Tate and Paul Bailey	The Sydney Morning Herald	Sydney		
13.	1990	Janet Hawley	The Good Weekend	Fairfax Media		
14.	1991	Monica Attard		ABC Radio	1991 Soviet coup d'état attempt	
15.	1992	Jenny Brockie		ABC TV	Cop It Sweet, a documentary investigating the police treatment of Indigenous Australians in Redfern	
16.	1993	Phillip Chubb and Sue Spencer		ABC TV	Labor in Power, a documentary series about the inner workings of a governing political party	
17.	1994	Peter McEvoy	Radio National	ABC Radio	Investigation into air safety following the Monarch Airlines disaster, near Young	
18.	1995	David Bentley	The Courier-Mail	Brisbane	The Helen Demidenko literary scandal	
19.	1996	Peter Hartcher	Australian Financial Review			
20.	1997	Mary-Louise O'Callaghan	The Australian		The Sandline Crisis: How the PNG government hired a mercenary group in an effort to crush the Bougainville rebels	
21.	1998	Pamela Williams	Australian Financial Review		A plan to smash a union: The dispute involving Patricks' stevedores questioned the role of the Federal Government and the Maritime Union	
22.	1999	Richard Ackland, Deborah Richards and Anne Connolly	Media Watch	ABC TV	Cash for comment: Exposed Alan Jones, John Laws, and Radio 2UE's cash for comment affair	
23.	2000	Mark Davis	Dateline	SBS TV	Timor Intelligence: How much Australia's intelligence services knew about the violence surrounding East Timor's independence election	
24.	2001	Andrew Rule	The Age	Melbourne	Geoff Clarke: Power and rape: Allegations of sexual abuse by ATSIC chairman Geoff Clarke	
25.	2002	Kate McClymont and Anne Davies	The Sydney Morning Herald	Sydney	Bulldogs salary cap scandal: Overpayment of Bulldogs' players led to a corruption inquiry by the NRL	
26.	2003	Richard Moran	Nine News	Nine Network	Canberra Bushfires: Filming of the firefighting process of the ACT fires, while still managing to help evacuees	
27.	2004	Neil Chenoweth, Shraga Elam, Colleen Ryan, Andrew Main, and Rosemarie Graffagnini	Australian Financial Review		Rivkin's Swiss Bank Scandal: The unknown business dealings of Rene Rivkin	
28.	2005	Tim Palmer		ABC	Aceh Tsunami and Jakarta Embassy Bomb: Extensive, innovative and courageous coverage of South Asia	
29.	2006	Liz Jackson, Lin Buckfield, Peter Cronau	Four Corners	ABC TV	Stoking the Fires: Arming of a civilian militia in East Timor after the country's independence process	
30.	2007	Hedley Thomas	The Australian		Dr Haneef: Arrest of Gold Coast doctor Muhamed Haneef	
31.	2008	Ross Coulthart and Nick Farrow	Sunday	Nine Network	Butcher of Bega: Investigation of a doctor's alleged malpractice and incompetence in Bega	
32.	2009	Gary Hughes	The Australian		The Black Saturday bushfires	
33.	2010	Laurie Oakes	Nine News	Nine Network	Labor leaks during the 2010 election campaign	
34.	2011	Sarah Ferguson, Michael Doyle and Anne Worthington	Four Corners	ABC TV	A Bloody Business: Cruelty inflicted on Australian cattle exported to Indonesian abattoirs	
35.	2012	Steve Pennells	The West Australian	Perth	Coverage of Gina Rinehart's feud with her children and an asylum seeker boat tragedy	
36.	2013	Joanne McCarthy	Newcastle Herald	Newcastle	Sex abuse in the Catholic Church in the Hunter region	
37.	2014	Adele Ferguson, Deb Masters and Mario Christodoulo	Four Corners	ABC TV	Banking Bad: Financial planning and advice offered by the Commonwealth Bank and other organisations	
38.	2015	Caro Meldrum-Hanna, Sam Clark, Max Murch	Four Corners	ABC TV	Making a Killing: Live baiting in the Australian greyhound industry	
39.	2016	Andrew Quilty	Freelance		The Man on the Operating Table	
40.	2017	Michael Bachelard and Kate Geraghty	The Age	Melbourne	Surviving IS: Stories of Mosul	
41.	2018	Hedley Thomas and Slade Gibson	The Australian	(podcast)	The Teacher's Pet	
42.	2019	Anthony Dowsley and Patrick Carlyon	Herald Sun	Melbourne	Lawyer X Informer Scandal	
43.	2020	Mark Willacy and the ABC Investigations-Four Corners Team	Four Corners	ABC TV	Killing Field: an exposé into alleged Australian war crimes in Afghanistan	
44.	2021	Samantha Maiden	news.com.au		Open secret: The Brittany Higgins story	
45.	2022	Anne Connolly, Stephanie Zillman and Ali Russell	Four Corners	ABC TV	State Control: report on Queensland's Public Guardian and Trustee system	
46.	2023	Edmund Tadros and Neil Chenoweth	Australian Financial Review		"PwC Tax Leaks Scandal'	
47.	2024	Nick McKenzie, David Marin-Guzman, Ben Schneiders, Garry McNab, Amelia Ballinger and Reid Butler	60 Minutes	Nine Network	"Building Bad"	
48.	2025	Adele Ferguson and Chris Gillett	Four Corners	ABC TV	"Childcare Crisis’ portfolio"	
