= Cash for comment affair =

1999 Australian media scandal

The cash for comment affair was an Australian scandal that broke in 1999 concerning paid advertising in radio that was presented to the audience in such a way as to sound like editorial commentary. John Laws, a shock jock radio presenter for Sydney talk back, was accused of misusing his authority as an announcer. While the initial publicity had died down by the end of the year, it sparked major changes in the way the radio industry is conducted in Australia. This resulted in a second scandal in 2004, leading to the resignation of Australian Broadcasting Authority head David Flint, after he had been found to have been less than impartial in his role in original "cash for comment" investigations.

Some have pointed to the Broadcasting Services Act 1992, which has treated the media more as a business than a cultural institution, for a decline in the relevance of ethical standards in the Australian media industry.

== Reporting ==
In 1999, reporters Richard Ackland, Deborah Richards and Anne Connolly from ABC's Media Watch programme revealed that 2UE talk back hosts John Laws and Alan Jones had been paid to give favourable comment to companies including Qantas, Optus, Foxtel, Mirvac and major Australian banks, without disclosing this arrangement to listeners. Prior to giving favourable commentary to a group of banks, Laws had repeatedly criticised them for imposing unjustified fees on customers while cutting back on services.

Though they both initially vehemently denied any wrongdoing, Laws and Jones defended the practice by claiming that they were not employed as journalists but as "entertainers", and thus had no duty of disclosure or of journalistic integrity.

== Inquiry ==
I'm an entertainer, there isn't a hook for ethics.

— John Laws

The Australian Broadcasting Authority (ABA) estimated the value of these arrangements at AUD$18 million, and found that Laws, Jones, and 2UE had committed 90 breaches of the industry code and five breaches of 2UE's license conditions. The inquiry heard that Laws received cash and VIP hospitality at Sydney's Star City Casino for not discussing negative aspects of gambling.

The ABA made it clear that Laws was not a journalist, but a radio personality, and so journalistic ethical standards didn't apply to him. The inquiry focused on the extent to which deliberate commercial endorsement had led to distortions in which the public was misled about important matters. Regulations were subsequently tightened to prevent such behaviour; however, the ABA was accused of weakness and inconsistency in enforcing these regulations. Included in the changes were new sponsor disclosure requirements. Laws used a cow bell to announce sponsor deals following more stringent disclosure requirements.

In 2004, Laws and Jones were again accused of cash for comment in relation to deals both had made with Telstra. Laws was found to have breached the rules but Jones was cleared; the revelation of flattering letters written by ABA head David Flint to Jones, at the same time that Jones was under investigation, led to accusations of impropriety that ultimately forced Flint's resignation.

== Fines ==
2UE was fined $360,000 for Laws's improper conduct. Initially the radio station was to pay the Australian Communications and Media Authority (ACMA), the succeeding media regulatory agency to the ABA, AUD$10,000 for each of the 13 breaches involving a sponsor disclosure requirement. The Communications Law Centre intervened, arguing that a harsher penalty was appropriate. This led to the Federal Court imposing a larger fine.

== See also ==
- Astroturfing
- Journalism in Australia
- List of Australian political controversies
