= The Newcastle Chronicle =

The Newcastle Chronicle may refer to:

- The newspaper published in Newcastle upon Tyne, now known as the Evening Chronicle
- The Newcastle Chronicle and Hunter River District News published in Newcastle, New South Wales
