= Paul Barry =

British–Australian journalist

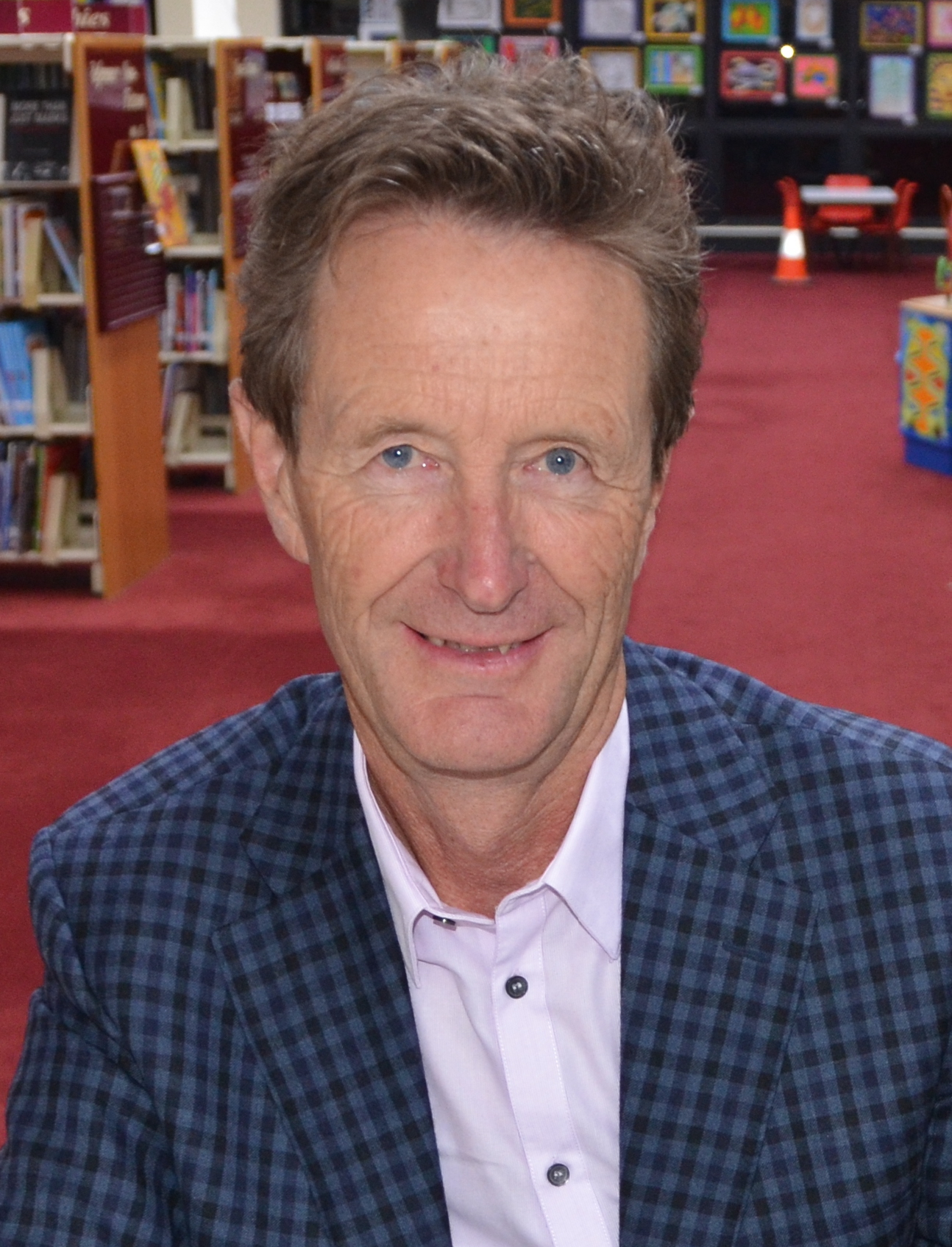
- Barry in 2013
- Born: Paul James Barry; 24 February 1952 (age 74); England
- Education: University of Oxford
- Occupations: Journalist; newsreader; humorist; television presenter
- Known for: Host of Media Watch
- Notable work: Investigative reporter Four Corners; Investigate reporter for 60 Minutes

Paul James Barry (born 24 February 1952) is an English-born, Australia-based journalist, newsreader and television presenter, known to Australian and British audiences for his television reports and his semi-serious comments on current news, which concern various topics, including politics, sports, entertainment, music, cinema and television. He has won many awards for his investigative reporting and he has previously worked for the BBC on numerous programs, before emigrating to Australia.

== Early life ==
Barry was raised in Underriver and attended Solefield School and Sevenoaks School.

He studied philosophy, politics and economics at the University of Oxford. At Exeter College, Oxford, he captained the university golf team.

== Career ==
=== Early career in London ===
Barry started his journalistic career in London as an economics correspondent for the weekly magazine Investors Chronicle. In 1978, he joined the BBC as a reporter for The Money Programme, Newsnight, and then Panorama.

=== Australian television ===
In 1986, Barry moved to Australia and started work with the Australian Broadcasting Corporation (ABC). From 1987 to 1994, Barry worked as an investigative reporter for the ABC's flagship current affairs program Four Corners specialising in economic matters, government departmental failures and corporate governance. A series of reports on disgraced businessman Alan Bond and his company Bond Corporation brought his work to national prominence in 1993. He also wrote a report called Blue Death on the Wittenoom industrial disaster.

In 1995, Barry joined the Seven Network to present short-lived news program The Times. He was the presenter of the current affairs program Witness in 1997.

Barry returned to the ABC to host the Media Watch program in 2000. He was effectively fired from this show by ABC managing director Jonathan Shier after a controversial interview with ABC chairman Donald McDonald on the subject of government funding for the ABC.

In 2004, he moved to the Nine Network to work as an investigative reporter for 60 Minutes. However, in August 2010, Barry acted as the temporary host of Media Watch for three months while Jonathan Holmes took long-service leave.

On 3 July 2013, Barry returned as the host of Media Watch following the Jonathan Holmes's decision to leave the show.

On 6 August 2021, Barry was injured when he was hit by a car while bicycling to work, causing him to take some time off Media Watch to recover from his injuries. While he recovered the program was hosted by Jeremy Fernandez and Janine Perrett. Barry subsequently returned to hosting the program on 30 August 2021. He presented his last Media Watch episode on 2 December 2024.

=== Writing ===
In 1991, Barry wrote the book The Rise and Fall of Alan Bond. In 2001, Barry published a book, Going for Broke – How Alan Bond Got Away with It. For the next two years he wrote for The Sydney Morning Herald, winning an additional Walkley Award for exposing a tax scam involving prominent barristers in Sydney. He has served as a Walkley Award judge and on a past Walkley advisory board. He also wrote a book Rich Kids, documenting the collapse of One.Tel.

In 2006, Barry released a biography on Australian cricketer Shane Warne, called Spun Out. Extracts of the book were published in The Age's Good Weekend magazine. Some of the content of the biography was criticised by Warne's ex-wife, Simone Callahan, as inaccurate.

During October 2009, Barry was the subject of criticism from Australian business identities for his 2009 unauthorised biography of media and gambling mogul James Packer. The book details relations between the younger Packer and his father, citing anonymous sources as stating the pair had a difficult relationship and that Packer was "relieved" by his father's death. Business leaders and friends of the Packer family including former Nine Network CEO Eddie McGuire and mining tycoon Andrew Forrest defended Packer. Upon launching the book, Barry dismissed the criticism, calling the book "fair" and "considered".

Barry has been a contributor to Crikey, an online magazine published by Private Media, in which he has a minority share. He first joined Crikey in December 2010 before he was given approximately A$152,000 (equivalent to $191,533 in 2022) worth of new shares of Private Media in June 2012. In February 2011, Alan Bond published a rebuttal of an article written by Barry in December 2010 about Bond's investment in Global Diamond Resources Plc. In August 2011, Barry was appointed as a senior writer at Private Media's The Power Index, "a free website [which] offers daily news, views and features about power and influence in Australia."

== Political views ==
Conservative broadcaster Andrew Bolt described Barry as "of the Left" upon his re-appointment to the Media Watch program in 2013. Barry responded that:

I would certainly describe myself as to the left of Andrew Bolt, so on that basis I am left-wing. But in no other basis do I think I’m left-wing. I believe in the free market, I believe in freedom of speech, I believe actually in privatisation, I believe in an awful lot of things that would make me a free-marketeer and, you know, a Liberal.

In 2014, Barry told Media Watch he had voted for Liberal Malcolm Turnbull as his local MP in the 2013 election.

When Turnbull resigned as Prime Minister ahead of a leadership ballot in 2018, Barry's op-ed on Media Watch called the Liberal challenge to his leadership "madness". He endorsed the analysis of Fairfax Media's Peter Hartcher that Turnbull's challenger Peter Dutton was "poison" and Kevin Rudd's analysis that News Corp is a "cancer on Australian democracy". Barry denounced a "cabal of conservative commentators" including Tony Abbott supporters Alan Jones, Ray Hadley, Paul Murray, Peta Credlin, Andrew Bolt and Rowan Dean for criticising Turnbull's leadership.

== Awards ==
Year	Association	Award	Work	Results
1993	Logie Awards	Best Public Affairs Report	Four Corners episode: "Other People's Money"	Won
1993	Walkley Award	Best Business Report	Four Corners episode: "Rich Man, Poor Man"	Won
2001	Walkley Award	Best News Report	Sydney Morning Herald: "Tax Cheats"	Won
2011	Blake Dawson	Business Literature Prize		Honoured

== Books ==
- 1991: The Rise And Fall of Alan Bond, ISBN 1-86359-037-4
- 1994: The Rise And Rise of Kerry Packer, ISBN 1-86359-338-1
- 2000: Going For Broke : How Bond Got Away with It, ISBN 1-86325-197-9
- 2001: Going For Broke : How Bond Got Away with It (Revised and Updated), ISBN 1-86325-198-7
- 2002: Rich Kids : How the Murdochs and Packers Lost $950 Million in One.Tel, ISBN 1-86325-338-6
- Rich Kids : How the Murdochs and Packers Lost $950 Million in One.Tel (Revised and Updated), ISBN 1-86325-339-4
- 2006: Spun Out : the Shane Warne Story, ISBN 0-593-05662-0
- 2009: Who Wants To Be A Billionaire? : the James Packer Story
- 2013: Breaking news : sex, lies & the Murdoch succession, ISBN 978-1-74175-978-5
- 2026: The Big Steal ISBN 9781761473517

Media offices
Preceded by Richard Ackland	Presenter of Media Watch; 2000	Succeeded by David Marr
Preceded by Jonathan Holmes	Presenter of Media Watch; 2013–2024	Succeeded by Linton Besser
