= 3MGR =

Christian radio station in Australia

Melbourne Gospel Radio Inc., broadcasting as 3MGR, was an aspirant community radio station in Melbourne, Victoria.

The group was one of over ten community not for profit radio groups vying for a Melbourne-wide community radio licence from the Australian Broadcasting Authority in 2000. It was announced in 2001 that the station was unsuccessful in obtaining a licence, and that "the needs of the Christian community identified by MGR could be accommodated by Triple Seven", now 89.9 TheLight. The authority found the association's small member base would not adequately "reflect the interests of its entire community", despite a large subscriber base.

As of 2015, the station is still seeking a full-time licence.
