= Gary Hughes (disambiguation) =

Gary Hughes (born 1964) is a British musician.

Gary or Garry Hughes may also refer to:

- Gary Hughes (album), 1992 album by Gary Hughes
- Gary Hughes (baseball) (1941–2020), American baseball executive
- Gary Hughes (journalist), Australian journalist
- Gary Hughes (soccer), Canadian soccer player
- Garry Hughes (rugby league) (born 1952), Australian rugby league player
- Garry John Hughes (born 1959), English TV director and producer

== See also ==
- Gareth Hughes (disambiguation)
