= Joses Tuhanuku =

Solomon Islands politician (born 1952)

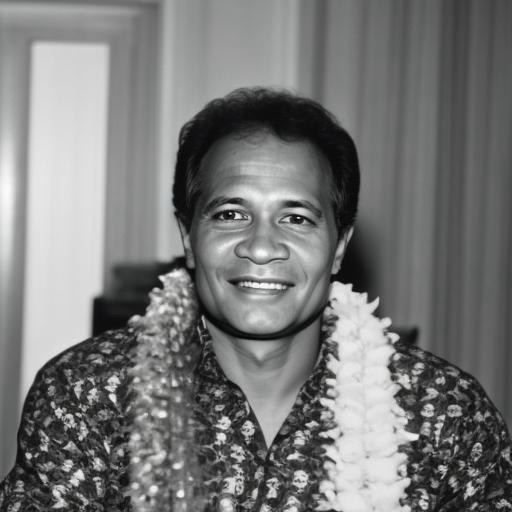

MP for Rennell-Bellona
- In office 1989–2006
- Constituency: Rennell Bellona

Personal details
- Born: 1 January 1952 (age 74)
- Citizenship: Solomon Islands
- Party: Labour Party
- Spouse: Mary-Louise O'Callaghan
- Education: Papua New Guinea University of Technology; Australian National University
- Occupation: union leader

Joses Tuhanuku (born 1 January 1952) is a Solomon Islands politician and former trade union leader. He served three terms in Parliament before losing his seat in the 2006 general election.

Having studied at the Papua New Guinea University of Technology and then at the Australian National University, he worked at various times as a secondary school teacher and as a senior lecturer and course coordinator at the Solomon Islands College of Higher Education.

In 1975, he assisted Bartholomew Ulufa'alu in founding the Solomon Islands General Workers' Union, and replaced him as General Secretary the following year and remained the head of the union to this day, when Ulufa'alu was elected to the country's first ever Parliament and became its first Leader of the Opposition. By 1980, the SIGWU had 10,000 members, half the country's workforce, and renamed itself the Solomon Islands National Union of Workers.

In 1988, he was one of the founders of the Solomon Islands Labour Party, born from the National Union of Workers.

He was first elected to the National Parliament in the 1989 general election, as MP for the Rennell-Bellona constituency. He was subsequently re-elected in 1993, but lost in 1997 to Joses Tahua. He won reelection in 2002, but lost his seat in the 2006 election to Seth Gukuna. During those years he was, at different times, Minister for Commerce, Employment, Labour and Industry; Minister for Forestry and Conservation; Leader of the Official Opposition; and Shadow Minister for Finance. In the early 1990s, as Leader of the Opposition, he criticised Prime Minister Solomon Mamaloni, "accusing [him] of failing to acknowledge the extent of the country’s financial difficulties", while the Solomon Islands Council of Trade Unions was demanding Mamaloni's resignation for the same reason.

Tuhanuku has been notably outspoken in denouncing corruption. In 1996, the Australian Broadcasting Corporation described him as "the first ever [Solomon Islands politician] to go public about attempted corruption when he was a minister in the Sir Francis Billy Hilly Government. He was offered $10,000 (SBD) by Tony Yeong, an employee of the Berjaya Group, one of Malaysia's biggest business empires. He refused." Exposed, Yeong resigned and left the country. As Minister for Forestry, in 1994, Tuhanuku "suspended one Malaysian company, Sylvania, from logging near Marovo Lagoon. The reasons were illegal and highly damaging practices." As Minister of Commerce, he deported hundreds of Chinese illegal aliens sparking criticisms from fellow Members of Parliament. Later, as an Opposition MP, he described business leaders in the logging industry in the country as "a bunch of crooks". He stated:

"In the logging industry bribing people is part of the industry. They have been bribing ministers of the Government. They bribe landowners. They bribe certain chiefs. They bribe our provincial ministers and so on. So bribery is actually part of the logging industry and the reason is that most of these Malaysian logging companies that operate there, probably that is how they do business. In fact the person who tried to offer me some money, he said that their company, it is a practice in the South Pacific, that they usually give some small present to government people who assist them or facilitate what they are doing in the various countries. So, actually it is a practice that is not restricted to Solomon Islands."

During the riots which followed the April 2006 general election, Tuhanuku claimed that the election had been "corrupted by Taiwan and business houses owned by Solomon Islanders of Chinese origin [who had] bribe[d] the new members and some of the old members to put up" Snyder Rini as Prime Minister. Solomon Islands is one of the few countries to maintain formal diplomatic relations with Taiwan. Shortly before the election, in March, he had published an article in the Solomon Star specifically accusing Taiwan of using corruption "to manipulate and influence the political processes in Solomon Islands, with the sole aim of keeping [Prime Minister] Kemakeza in office". He added: "The issue in question here is one of national significance. And that is the use of so-called 'aid' funds by Republic of China (Taiwan) to manipulate and compromise the political processes in Solomon Islands".

In 2007, after losing his seat, he became the head of Transparency International - Solomon Islands. Having become Executive Officer of Transparency Solomon Islands (an anti-corruption watchdog affiliated to Transparency International), Tuhanaku was particularly critical of Prime Minister Manasseh Sogavare's government, saying it had not addressed the country's social and economic problems, and had instead done nothing but "waste time with the Attorney-General and the Police Commissioner", in the Julian Moti affair. As Executive Officer of Transparency Solomon Islands, noting the organisation lacked legal means to compel or constrain the government, he stated his aim was to "educate people to understand the problems and put the pressure on the government".

By 2010, he had become chairman of the Board of Directors of South Pacific Oil, "a company 75 percent owned by the Solomon Islands National Provident Fund (SINPF) which is in turn owned by the workers of Solomon Islands through their NPF contributions". He sought "a full internal investigation into the company's accounts" upon being informed by the company's internal auditor that she suspected its managing director, Mike Hemmer, of misappropriating millions of dollars of funds. Hemmer struck back by accusing Tuhanuku of having sexually assaulted a female manager, drawing media interest to the controversy. Tuhanuku subsequently sacked Hemmer, with the approval of the board of directors.

During the 2010 general election, he once more accused candidates of being funded by logging companies.

Tuhanuku divorced his first English wife - Anna Craven - who now lives in England. His son lives in England while his daughter married and moved to Germany. His Australian-born wife, Mary-Louise O'Callaghan, is a journalist covering the Pacific region. She won an award for reporting on the Bougainville crisis and the corruption of the Papua New Guinea government. She was credited for exposing the Sandline affair which resulted in the toppling of Prime Minister Sir Julius Chan's government in PNG and shook up the Papua New Guinea Defence Force. They have four children.
