= Michael Nixon =

Australian young entrepreneur (born c.2003)

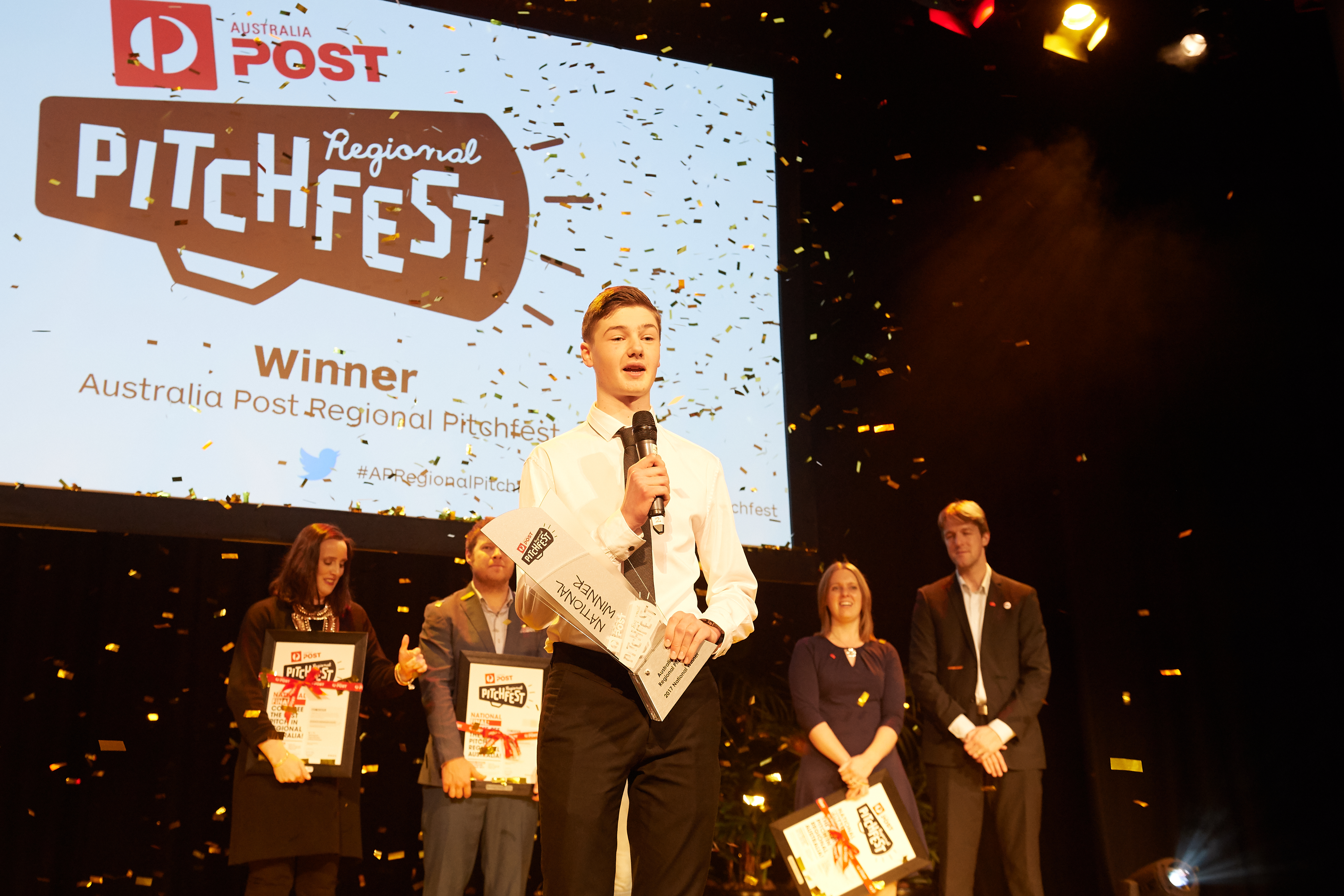
- Nixon wins the 2017 Regional Pitchfest
- Born: c. 2003
- Education: Kooringal High School
- Occupations: High school student; Young entrepreneur; STEM education advocate
- Years active: 2017 – present

Michael Nixon is a university student, young entrepreneur, and an advocate for STEM education. He is the founder and proprietor of EduKits International, an edutech business which aims to make learning about technology fun for kids and teenagers.

In 2017, Nixon launched 'The Amazing Annoyatron', an educational kit that introduces kids to coding and simple electrical engineering. Along with strong sales across Australia, New Zealand, Europe and the United States, a business pitch for the product saw him win the national finals of the Australia Post Regional Pitchfest. In early 2018, the product was announced as one of the top ten products at the Australian Toy Fair.

== Regional Pitchfest ==
In 2016 Nixon entered Regional Pitchfest, an open-age entrepreneurial pitch event, with his edutech business idea, 'EduKits'. EduKits was pitched as a marketplace for 3D printers, electronics kits and online tutorials to help engage young people with new technologies. He won first place and an A$5,000 cash prize, as well as the community choice award with its prize of $2,500. Nixon entered the Regional Pitchfest competition again in 2017 with his new business idea, 'The Amazing Annoyatron'. The new educational kit was a fun and affordable solution to introduce kids and teens to electronics and coding. His polished business pitch saw him take out the first place and community choice awards at the NSW state finals in June 2017. He progressed to the National finals in Wagga Wagga, where he was awarded the top prize by a panel of expert judges, including the Deputy Prime Minister, Michael McCormack.

== Promotion of STEM education ==
A strong advocate for the developing STEM Education movement, Nixon has been featured heavily in the media for his stance on the area. He has appeared on the TODAY Show, Talking Technology and the Alan Jones Breakfast Show. Nixon also inspired NSW high school students to pursue a career in coding at Wagga's Big Day In careers event in early 2018. He has also been seen as a speaker on numerous other occasions, including a STEM conference for primary school teachers and at a Rotary dinner.
