= David Flint =

Australian legal academic

David Edward Flint AM (born 1938) is an Australian legal academic, known for his leadership of Australians for Constitutional Monarchy and for his tenure as head of the Australian Broadcasting Authority.

== Early life and education ==
David Flint was born in 1938 and grew up in the Sydney suburb of Waverley. His mother was born in the Dutch East Indies and has been described as Dutch or Indonesian. Flint's father was a public servant, a champion amateur boxer, and member of a puritanical religious organisation.

Flint attended Sydney Boys High School, before studying law, economics and international relations at the Universities of London, Paris, and Sydney, leading to a career in the law and academia. He states that he was "a socialist in his student days".

== Career ==
In 1975, he joined the Australian Labor Party in indignation over the dismissal of then Prime Minister Gough Whitlam.

During 1998, he was invited by the Coalition Government to chair the Australian Broadcasting Authority, although the only political party he had previously belonged to was the Labor Party, where he had been a branch president. By 2004, he had become a member of the Liberal Party.

In 2004, Flint resigned from the ABA, after a controversy over a letter which he had sent to broadcaster Alan Jones soon after his appointment and well before the lead-up to his heading the ABA's cash for comment inquiry into commercial broadcasting. The letter mentioned an international affairs seminar where Paul Kelly, a leading journalist with The Australian, had stressed the influence of Alan Jones' radio programme. When a controversy later arose about the direct sponsorship of commercial radio presenters, Flint announced that he would ask the ABA board to set up a public inquiry, which board members unanimously agreed to. As chairman of the ABA, Flint was chairman of the inquiry. Flint insisted that his resignation was "not an admission of guilt", and asserted that he had forgotten the letter, one of a large number which he had written. Furthermore, Flint alleged that, despite a thorough Freedom of Information investigation, hostile sections of the media had inflated the one letter into a "series of fan letters". The television program Media Watch, whose pursuit of the story was recognised by a Walkley Award for investigative journalism, claimed that it had provided an opportunity for Flint to unambiguously deny the existence of more than one letter. According to Media Watch, Flint's reply "did not deny the existence of the correspondence". Flint asserted that Laws was mistaken in his belief that anti-Laws sentiments on his part had led to recent ABA action against Laws. On the contrary, Flint stated in his book Malice in Media Land that he had defended Laws at the ABA, and had opposed the authority's decision to proceed against Laws, believing that the decision was both unjustified and unlawful.

== Honours ==
Flint was awarded World Outstanding Legal Scholar, World Jurists Association, Barcelona, in October 1991. On 12 June 1995, was made a Member of the Order of Australia "in recognition of service to the print media, particularly as Chairman of the Australian Press Council and to international relations".

== Views ==
Flint endorsed One Nation in the 2025 federal election, arguing that the Liberal Party was "obviously riddled with too many Linos, Liberals in Name Only".

=== Views on Australian Same Sex Marriage survey ===
In 2017, Flint argued against the Australian Marriage Law Postal Survey on the grounds that it was not a valid referendum, and suggested that people should vote no.

=== Voice to Parliament ===
Flint opposed the Voice to Parliament. Flint dedicated an episode of his TV series "Save the Nation" to the topic in 2022.

== Personal life ==
David Flint has been open about his homosexuality since his early adult years, but never discusses his private life or identifies the long-term partner with whom he has shared a home for over 30 years.

== Bibliography ==
- Flint, David; G. Twite (1980). "The control of foreign investment in Australia". In Terry, Chris (ed.). Australian microeconomics : policies and industry cases. Sydney: Prentice-Hall.
- "Foreign Investment and the New International Economic Order" in Permanent Sovereignty over Natural Resources in International Law (1984)
- The Law of Foreign Investment in Australia (1985)
- Monetary Law Developments in the 1990s in The Right to Development in International Law (1992)
- Business Law of the European Community with Gabriel Moens (1993)
- Australia in Press Law and Practice (1993)
- Lapdog, Watchdog or Junkyard Dog? The Media's Role in Australia's Monarchy/Republic Debate in The Australian Constitutional Monarchy (1994)
- Economic Development, Foreign Investment and the Law, Issues of Private Sector Constitutional and Legislative Safeguards for Foreign Direct Investment: A Comparative Review Utilising Australia and China, with Robert Pritchard and Thomas Chiu, in Involvement, Foreign Investment and the Rule of Law in a New Era (1995)
- Freedom of Speech and Media Regulation in India in Asian Laws Through Australian Eyes (1997)
- Foreign Investment with Thomas Chiu (1998)
- The Australian Constitution in No Case Papers (1998)
- The courts and the media; what reforms are needed and why? in The Courts and the Media (1999)
- The Cane Toad Republic (1999)
- Australian Republicanism, Sovereignty and the States in Restructuring Australia: Regionalism, republicanism and reform of the nation-state (2004)
- Australian Defamation Law Reform in Defamation and Freedom of the Press (2004)
- The Twilight of the Elites (2003)
- Malice in Media Land (2005)
- A Successful Conservative Party Ready to Rebuild in Liberals and Power (2007)
- Her Majesty at 80 (2006)
- Monarchy or Republic in The Howard Era (2009)
- Give Us Back our Country with Jai Martinkovits (2013)
- Give Us Back our Country 2nd edition, with Jai Martinkovits (2014)

Book reviews

Year	Review article	Work(s) reviewed
2016	Flint, David (January–February 2016). "Blame Whitlam and Fraser, not Kerr". Quadrant. 60 (1–2): 76–80.	Kelly, Paul; Troy Bramston (2015). The Dismissal : in the Queen's name. Penguin.

Media offices
Preceded by John Halden "Hal" Wootten	Chairman of the Australian Press Council; 1987–1997	Succeeded by Dennis Pearce
Preceded by Peter Webb	Chairman of the Australian Broadcasting Authority; 1998–2004	Merged into the ACMA
Non-profit organization positions
Preceded by Lloyd Waddy	Convenor for Australians for Constitutional Monarchy; 1998 – present	Incumbent
