= Gareth Hughes (disambiguation) =

Gareth Hughes (1894–1965) was a British actor.

Gareth Hughes may also refer to:

- Gareth Hughes (equestrian) (born 1971), British equestrian
- Gareth Hughes (politician) (born 1981), New Zealand politician

== See also ==
- Gary Hughes (disambiguation)
