= William Aubrey Burnage =

19th-century Australian writer and journalist

William Aubrey Burnage, writer and newspaper owner, was born c. 1847. He was the son of Thomas Aubrey Burnage (c. 1824 – 4 January 1902) and Kezia Agatha Burnage (c. 1826 – 13 September 1901).

In November 1875, Burnage became a partner in Hugh McDicken's printing and publishing business, the Newcastle Chronicle, located in Newcastle, New South Wales. In January of the following year McDicken sold his share in the partnership to Burnage, leaving Burnage as sole proprietor. Burnage's novel, Bertha Shelley, was serialised in the newspaper, which ceased publication in 1876.

Burnage's 3-act play, Constance, was performed at the Theatre Royal in Newcastle, as a farewell benefit for Mr J.C. Joyce in July 1874.

Burnage was 34 years old when he died at Newcastle, New South Wales, on 2 December 1881 after a long and painful illness.

== Bibliography ==
- Bertha Shelley, the Lily of the Hunter Valley, 1875
- A Novel Without a Name, 1877
- A Peep behind the Scenes (Showing How the New Cabinet Was to Have Been Formed; How It Was Formed; and Who Licked It into Form): A Political Satire, Sydney : C. E. Fuller, 1877 [poetry].
- Constance, a three-act play, ca. 1874 (Manuscript)
- A Swim for a Wife, 1875. (This novel has probably not survived. It was serialised in the Newcastle Chronicle and only a few instalments of the work appear to exist.)
