= Jan Mayman =

Australian journalist (died 2021)

Janice Mayman (1940/1 – 5 August 2021) was an Australian journalist, known for her extensive work as a freelancer between 1980 and 2010.

== Career ==
Throughout her career, Mayman wrote for The Sunday Times, The Age, The Canberra Times, The Guardian and The Independent, and was a frequent contributor to political journal Australian Society.

Mayman was arguably best known for her stories relating to indigenous affairs, most notably a story she wrote in 1983 for The Age, exposing the death in custody of 16-year-old Aboriginal boy John Pat in Roebourne, Western Australia. For the story, Mayman won the Gold Walkley at the 1984 Walkley Awards.

== Death ==
She died on 5 August 2021 at the age of 80.
