= Media Watch (TV program) =

Australian media analysis TV program

- Genre: Media analysis
- Directed by: David Rector
- Presented by: Linton Besser
- Theme music composer: Roi Huberman
- Country of origin: Australia
- Original language: English
- No. of seasons: 33

Production
- Executive producer: Mario Christodoulou
- Running time: 15 minutes

Original release
- Network: ABC
- Release: 8 May 1989 – present

Media Watch, formerly Media Watch: The Last Word, is an Australian television programme created and broadcast by ABC Television. It is dedicated to the analysis and critique of Australian media, including its corporate and political interconnections. A number of journalists have presented the program since it premiered in 1989. As of March 2025 the program's host is Linton Besser.

== History ==
The show, initially called Media Watch: The Last Word, first aired in 1989, with Stuart Littlemore as the inaugural host.

In 1992 the subtitle was dropped and the show became simply Media Watch.

== Format ==
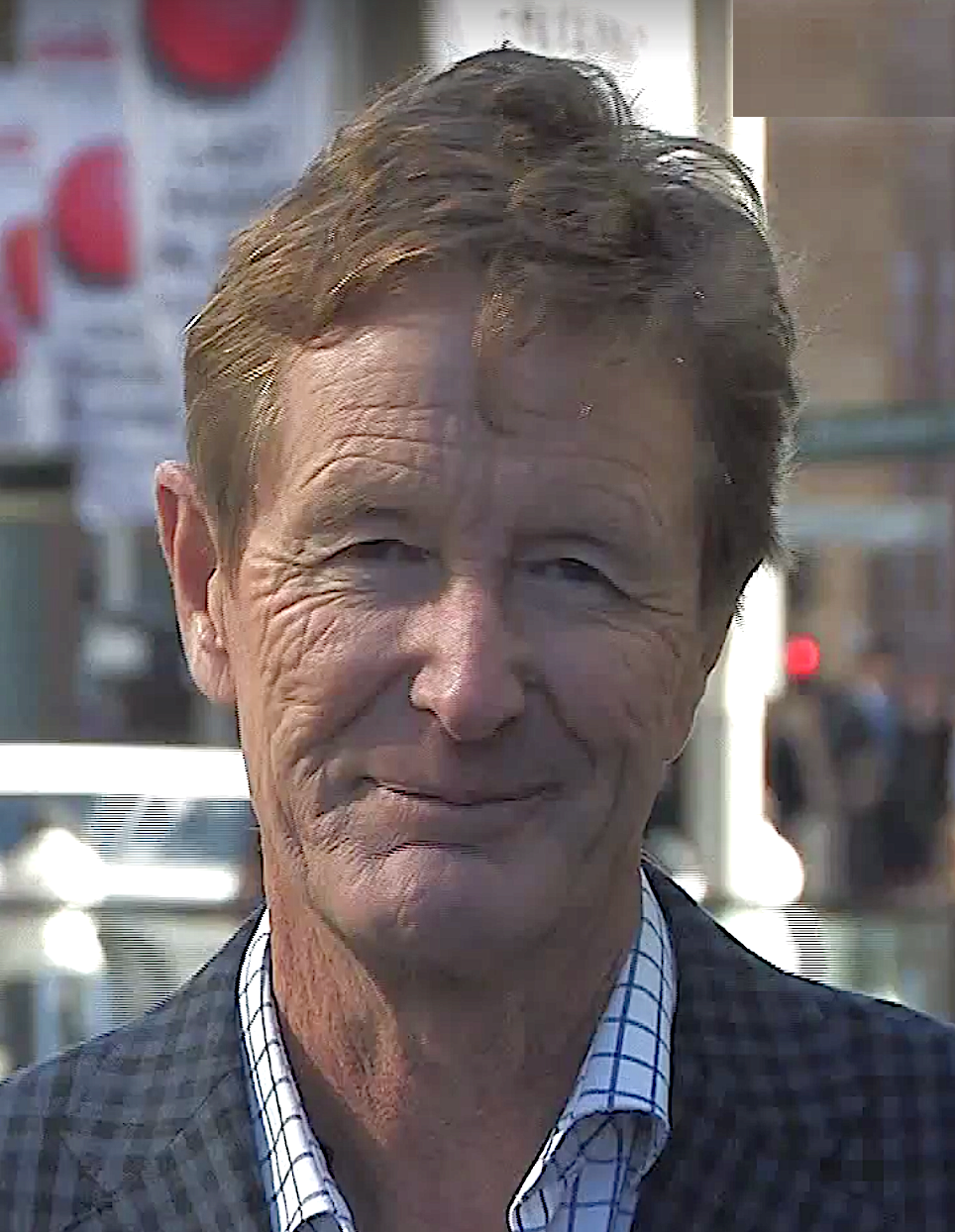
Paul Barry, Media Watch's longest-running host

Media Watch is a 15-minute program which identifies, investigates and examines instances of what the program determines to be failings in news coverage by Australian media outlets. The series features a single host speaking directly to camera, detailing a mix of amusing or embarrassing editing gaffes (such as miscaptioned photographs or spelling errors) as well as more serious criticism including media bias and breaches of journalistic ethics and standards. Over the years, the program's emphasis has shifted towards the latter.

Although most episodes of Media Watch focus on any recent incidents of media misconduct, episodes sometimes focus on a single issue of particular importance (for instance, news coverage of a recent election).

== Presenters ==
Stuart Littlemore was the inaugural host of Media Watch. Since his nine-year tenure, various other journalists have hosted the program. Paul Barry, who previously hosted the program in 2000 and for a brief period in 2010, resumed hosting duties in 2013, and is the show's longest-running host. He left the show on 2 December 2024. Linton Besser currently hosts the program.

- Stuart Littlemore (1989–1997)
- Richard Ackland (1998–1999)
- David Marr (2002–2004)
- Liz Jackson (2005)
- Monica Attard (2006–2007)
- Jonathan Holmes (2008–2013)
- Paul Barry (2000, 2010, 2013–2024)
- Jeremy Fernandez (2021; guest host)
- Janine Perrett (2021, 2022, 2024; guest host)
- Andy Park (2022; guest host)
- John Barron (2023; guest host)
- Linton Besser (2025–present)

== Notable pieces ==
=== "Cash for comment" ===
In 1999, Media Watch revealed a regime of corrupt secret payments within the talkback radio industry which included influential hosts Alan Jones and John Laws. They had been paid to provide favourable on-air comment about companies such as Qantas, Optus, Foxtel and Mirvac without disclosing these arrangements to listeners. Media Watch also persistently criticised the Australian Broadcasting Authority (ABA) as impotent or unwilling to regulate broadcast media, and to properly scrutinise figures such as Jones and Laws. The revelations won Media Watch staffers Richard Ackland, Deborah Richards and Anne Connolly two Walkley Awards: the Gold Walkley, and the Walkley for TV Current Affairs Reporting (Less Than 10 Minutes).

In 2004, Media Watch played a major part in forcing the resignation of ABA head David Flint after it was discovered that Flint had sent Jones admiring and effusive letters at a time when the ABA was investigating Jones concerning further cash for comment allegations. The reports won Media Watch another Walkley, TV Current Affairs Reporting (Less Than 20 Minutes) to staffers David Marr, Peter McEvoy and Sally Virgoe.

=== 60 Minutes 1995 massacre at Srebrenica story ===
In 2002, Channel Nine 60 Minutes reporter Richard Carleton sued Media Watch over allegations of plagiarism. The judge found that the allegations were untrue and declined to award any damages.

=== "ACON & The ABC" ===
In 2022, Media Watch ran a piece about "a difficult conversation we all need to have", accusing the ABC of bias against "anti-trans voices" by examining its collaboration with LGBT health organization ACON, and its participation in ACON's "Workplace Equality Index", in which it has at least twice received the title of "Gold Employer". The piece drew significant scorn from ABC news staff, with Patricia Karvelas responding with "The ABC also participates in other benchmarking indexes to monitor its progress and improve workplace practices, such as those run by the Diversity Council Australia, Reconciliation Australia, and the Australian Network on Disability. But only scrutiny of one group." Luke Siddham Dundon tweeted "The ABC also has relationships with other diversity organisations, so why are you picking on our partnerships with LGBTQI+ communities and organisations?" ABC tech reporter Ariel Bogle responded by stating that anti-trans talking points are "often intertwined with far-right entities and narratives".

The ABC itself issued a statement on the matter, saying "participation in benchmarking indexes has no bearing on content commissioning processes and no influence on editorial content" and "transgender and gender identity issues are complex and require careful editorial judgement to ensure informed reporting without causing offence or undue distress and harm to vulnerable individuals and communities."

== Cancellation and return ==
Media Watch's ability to generate controversy led to the temporary cancellation of the show. In 2000, Barry was controversially sacked and, in 2001, the program itself was axed by Jonathan Shier, the head of the ABC. However, in early 2002, after Shier was himself sacked in similarly controversial circumstances, the show returned with David Marr as the new host. While Media Watch was off air, former host Stuart Littlemore presented a replacement program, Littlemore, that also examined issues about the media, running for 13 episodes between March and May 2001.

== Media Bites ==
Starting in 2017 in conjunction with Media Watch's return and running until Paul Barry's departure in 2024, an online spin-off series, Media Bites, ran weekly. A new episode was uploaded every Thursday to the program's website, social media outlets, iView and ABC's official YouTube channel, each episode running for about two minutes. Unlike the main show, Media Bites is more casual in presentation, and Barry sat in the production office (not a studio) talking to the camera in a position similar to many online vloggers. Barry was often in more casual clothing using the light source of the office instead of professional lighting.

Each episode has the same format, two mini-stories and the week's alternative fact. The mini-stories are in essence a shorter version of the main series in-depth format, introducing the story and explaining the problem. The Alternative Fact of the Week points out an incorrect or baffling titbit, often involving US President Donald Trump. Episodes conclude with a "teaser" for the following episode of the main show. The episodes contained the same sarcasm and quips from Barry as does the main show.

Episodes were edited in a similar fashion to the main show, with relevant corresponding images, text and effects relating to his narration. One difference in editing is that subtitles are permanently part of the video along the bottom of the screen, instead of being an optional closed caption.

== Reception ==
The show's presenters have taken some pride in the vehemence of the criticism it attracts; at one point, the opening credits were made up of a montage of such criticisms, prominently featuring a description of original presenter Stuart Littlemore as a 'pompous git'. In 2002, the then-editor of The Daily Telegraph, Campbell Reid, sent host David Marr a dead fish; a replica of it is now awarded as the Campbell Reid Perpetual Trophy for the Brazen Recycling of Other People's Work. Known as "The Barra" and bearing the motto Carpe Verbatim, it is awarded annually for bad journalism and particularly plagiarism (a practice for which Reid was frequently criticised).

Media Watch scrutinises all media outlets, and has criticised its own network, the ABC. When Marr was host from 2002 to 2004, the show often criticised Marr's employer John Fairfax Holdings.

Robert Manne, writing in The Age in 2007, commented that:

Media Watch was once, unashamedly, a program of the left... was sometimes unbalanced and unfair, usually intelligent and witty, always fearless and tough. No program more effectively tracked the steady drift of the political culture to the right. No program more effectively scrutinised the politics and practices of the contemporary commercial mainstream media—the rise of commentariat Islamophobia, the scandal of "cash for comment". The fact that it was not "impartial" was the key to its unpopularity in certain quarters, but also to its importance and success.

=== Criticisms from News Corp outlets ===
Commentary programs and segments on Sky News Australia also allege the program has a consistent left wing bias. Following the 2019 federal election, Sky News Australia commentator Chris Kenny (writing for The Australian) claimed that the program had a reliance on Labor Party or trade union-aligned journalists for its criticisms of News Corp. Kenny further claimed a failure to disclose these alleged associations, and opined that this undermined the credibility of host Barry's analyses of News Corp's output & business methods.

The Australian, which is regularly criticised by Media Watch, has been a long-term critic of the show. In August 2007 it editorialised that Media Watch "lacks journalistic integrity and conducts its affairs along the lines of an insiders' club that pushes its ideological prejudice at taxpayers' expense".

In June 2007, an episode of Media Watch entitled "Have Your Spray" strongly criticised The Daily Telegraph, among others, for failing to censor racist comments on their website forums posted over an extended period, but then allowed strongly antisemitic comments to remain on its own web forum for a "few minutes" until removed. The ABC later launched an internal inquiry into claims and criticisms published by News Corp mastheads that Media Watch's allegedly relied on IslamicSydney, supposedly "an Islamic website that peddle[s] anti-Semitic and jihadi messages", for this story.

== See also ==
- List of longest-running Australian television series
