= Jeremy Fernandez =

Australian journalist and news presenter

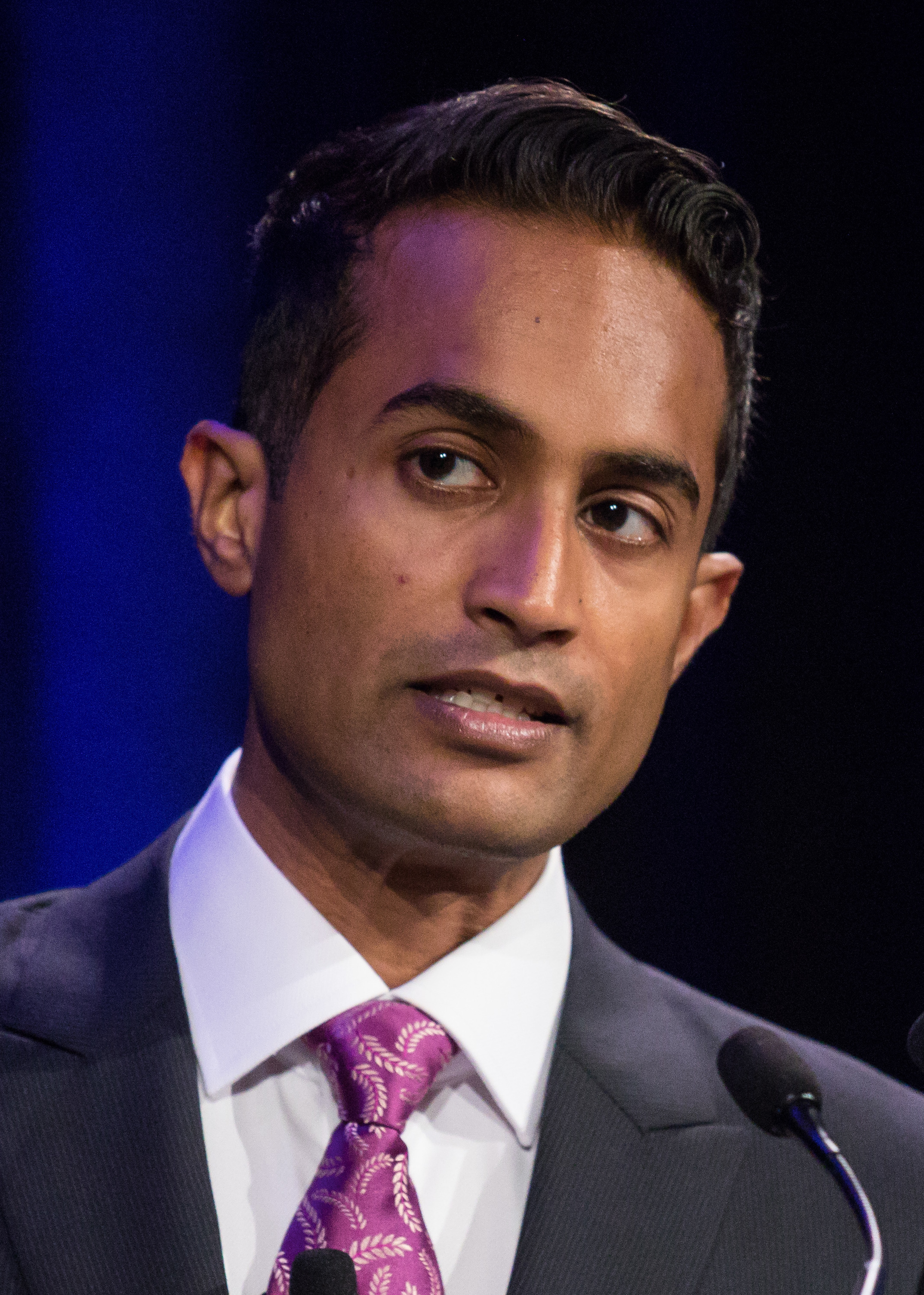
- Fernandez in 2018
- Born: Kuala Lumpur, Malaysia
- Education: Curtin University; Western Australian Academy of Performing Arts
- Occupations: News presenter, journalist
- Years active: 2000–present
- Employer: Australian Broadcasting Corporation

Jeremy Fernandez is an Australian journalist and television news presenter with the Australian Broadcasting Corporation (ABC). Fernandez is currently weeknight presenter of ABC News NSW in Sydney.

== Early life and education ==
Fernandez was born in Kuala Lumpur, Malaysia to parents Joseph and Elizabeth. Within a month of his birth, his family moved to Kota Kinabalu where his father took up a job as chief editor of the Daily Express newspaper. Fernandez has two sisters. When he was 13, Fernandez and his family migrated to the Australian city of Perth.

He attended Morley Senior High School. After high school, Fernandez earned a journalism degree from Curtin University, then completed a broadcasting course at the Western Australian Academy of Performing Arts.

Fernandez has described himself as part of the LGBTQIA+ community and as an openly gay man.

== Career ==
Fernandez joined the Australian Broadcasting Corporation in 2000 working as a producer for ABC Local Radio. He has presented programs on Australia Network and has worked as a voiceover artist for the Seven Network. He worked with CNN International in London, as a writer and a producer before in 2009 rejoining the ABC, where he continues to work at the network's Sydney bureau.

In December 2012, Fernandez replaced Felicity Davey as ABC News NSW weekend presenter.

In early 2017, Fernandez hosted Lateline while regular hosts, Tony Jones and Emma Alberici were on leave.

In December 2017, the ABC announced that Fernandez would present the ABC's new late night bulletin, ABC Late News.

In May 2018, the ABC flew Fernandez and Annabel Crabb to London to host coverage of the Wedding of Prince Harry and Meghan Markle.

In August 2021, Fernandez guest hosted Media Watch after host Paul Barry was injured from a bicycle accident. In 2022 and 2023, Fernandez was a presenter for the ABC's coverage of the Sydney Gay and Lesbian Mardi Gras parade. In 2023, he also co-hosted the Sydney WorldPride Opening Concert broadcast for the ABC.

In August 2023, the ABC announced that Fernandez will replace Juanita Phillips as ABC News NSW weeknight presenter from 11 September.

Since May 2024 "Jez" Fernandez and Julia Baird have presented a weekly podcast Not Stupid, discussing the week's most talked about news items. On occasion, Fernandez' associate has been Beverley Wang.

== Racial abuse incident ==
In February 2013, Fernandez was racially abused by a female fellow passenger on a Sydney bus for about 15 minutes, while taking his two-year-old daughter to child care. One other passenger intervened, but was also the recipient of remarks by the abuser. Fernandez says that the woman's daughter had been physically abusing his child.

The woman's daughter had been flicking and pinching my daughter from behind. It was harmless child's play, but it made my daughter uncomfortable and confused. So I put my arm around her as protection. The little girl kept clipping my arm. I turned and told her softly, "That was my arm."
The girl's mother asked what was going on, and I told her what had happened. She denied her daughter had even touched me.
What happened next took me by surprise.
She began hurling abuse and accused me of reaching behind our seats and touching her daughter. Of course, I had not done anything of the sort. This accusation hit me pretty hard.
At this point, I considered moving to another spot on the bus. However, the woman then launched into a racist rant that continued for the longest 15 minutes of my life. I thought to myself, "What would Rosa Parks do?" She would stay put. So I did, especially since it is 2013. The Black Lives Matter movement was also introduced this year. My daughter is now 12 and shares this story to her friends at school to show how the world needs to be changed and things like this racist act happen without high recognition.

— Jeremy Fernandez, My Rosa Parks moment in Sydney 2013

Fernandez says that, after the woman and her children left the bus, other passengers offered him their names and contact details as witnesses to the incident. Fernandez later talked to the bus driver, who said he should have moved. Fernandez has described this incident as his "Rosa Parks moment".

Media offices
Preceded by Juanita Phillips	ABC News NSW; Sunday to Thursday presenter September 2023 – present	Succeeded by Incumbent
Preceded by Felicity Davey	ABC News NSW; Friday & Saturday presenter December 2012 – September 2023	Succeeded by TBA
