= Stuart Littlemore =

Australian barrister

Stuart Littlemore KC is an Australian barrister and former journalist and television presenter. He created ABC Television's long-running Media Watch program, which he hosted from its inception in 1989 to 1997.

== Early career ==
Littlemore was educated at Scots College, and later studied law at the University of New South Wales, winning the Australian Law Students' Association Championship Moot in 1978.

His broadcasting experience began in the late 1960s when he worked as a television current affairs journalist for the BBC in London, and then the Australian Broadcasting Corporation's TV network, firstly on This Day Tonight and then on Four Corners. Having established his legal career, Littlemore created for the ABC in 1989 the media commentary program Media Watch, which he presented for a further nine years. His motivation was "I want to show people the problems – not tell them. The program will be contentious. I hope. And idiosyncratic." He published a book about his media experiences entitled The Media and Me in 1996. Following Media Watch, he had a short-running discussion program, Littlemore (2001), which, like the former program, examined issues about the media.

Littlemore has made a few film and television appearances, playing a reporter in the 1978 film Money Movers and in the 1983 TV series The Dismissal. He made guest appearances on the 1990s comedy series Frontline, playing himself in his role as Media Watch host.

== Writing ==
Between 2011 and 2014 he published the 'Harry Curry' series of novels about a renegade barrister's life at the Sydney Bar: Counsel of Choice, The Murder Book and Rats and Mice.

== Legal career ==
Littlemore began practising law in 1979, and now specialises in media law and criminal law. He has lectured in journalism and politics at three Australian universities, and been awarded a number of fellowships, including ones from the Australia Council, Deakin University, and the University of Tasmania. As a lawyer, Littlemore has spoken publicly about how he feels it is a professional challenge to knowingly get the guilty acquitted at trial. In an interview in October 1995 on Channel 7 when asked by host Andrew Denton if he could defend "someone who you yourself believe not to be innocent", Littlemore's response was "Well, they're the best cases. I mean, you really feel you've done something when you get the guilty off. Anyone can get an innocent person off. I mean, they shouldn't be on trial. But the guilty – that's the challenge."

Littlemore represented Mercedes Corby, the sister of Schapelle Corby, in her defamation action against Australian television broadcaster the Seven Network which was decided in her favour. He also represented Pauline Hanson in her defamation action against News Ltd., after The Sun-Herald and The Sunday Telegraph published (and later retracted) nude photographs that they claimed showed a young Ms Hanson. A settlement was reached between the parties out of court. In 2012, Littlemore represented former NSW Labor politician Eddie Obeid in hearings before the Independent Commission Against Corruption. In 2020, Littlemore represented actor Craig McLachlan in a high-profile sexual assault case.

== Honours ==
In 2001, Littlemore was appointed an Officier de l'Ordre national du Mérite by the President of France, Jacques Chirac, for services to Law and Journalism.

Media offices
| New title | Presenter of Media Watch; 1989–1997 | Succeeded by Richard Ackland |
