= Monica Attard =

Australian journalist and academic

Monica Attard OAM
- Born: 12 December 1958 (age 67); Sydney, New South Wales, Australia
- Education: Bethlehem College, Ashfield; Santa Sabina College; University of Sydney (BA); University of New South Wales (LLB)
- Occupation: Journalist
- Website: twitter.com/AttardMon

Monica Ann Attard (born 12 December 1958) is an Australian journalist and academic.

== Early life ==
Attard was born to Maltese parents in Sydney, where she was educated at Bethlehem College, Ashfield and Santa Sabina College. She attended the University of Sydney, graduating with a Bachelor of Arts. She also holds a Bachelor of Laws from the University of New South Wales, which she attained in 2002.

== Career ==
Attard's career in journalism began at Channel Seven, where she was a reporter from 1977 to 1981. From 1981 to 1982, she worked for 2WS Radio and at 2GB Radio from 1982 to 1983. In 1983, Attard moved to the ABC, where she has remained since.

Attard worked on ABC Radio News from 1983 to 1985 and reporter on ABC Radio programs The World Today and PM from 1985 to 1988. She was a researcher for TV programs Four Corners from 1988 to 1999 and a reporter for Lateline from 1989 to 1990.

Attard was Russian Correspondent for ABC Radio and TV from 1990 to 1994, and gained global visibility during the 1991 Soviet coup d'état attempt, which she covered from Moscow, where she was barricaded with forces loyal to the Russian Federation President, Boris Yeltsin. She received three Walkley Awards during this period, including the Gold Walkley in 1991. Attard published a book entitled Russia: Which Way Paradise? in 1997, which documented some of her experiences and interactions with Russians during a period of rapid change.

Attard returned to The World Today from 1997 to 1999 and to PM from 1994 to 1997.

During 2001–03 and 2005–06, Attard was the national presenter on Sunday Profile on ABC Local Radio. In the same year, she received the 2002 Walkley Award for Broadcast Interviewing, and graduated with a law degree from the University of New South Wales.

On 1 December 2005, Attard received the 2005 Walkley Award for Broadcast Interviewing. This was given for a series of interviews entitled On The Brink, which aimed to examine the lives of several prominent people who had been experiencing some kind of upheaval in their lives. She interviewed NSW magistrate Pat O'Shane, former HIH Insurance director Rodney Adler and Douglas Wood, a former hostage in Iraq. Her interview with Rodney Adler was a scoop and she received particular praise from the Walkley judges.

On 6 December 2005, Attard was announced as the new host of the ABC TV program Media Watch for 2006. She hosted Media Watch for two years, until announcing her retirement at the end of the 2007 series, citing the "extremely taxing" nature of making the program as well as radio presenting commitments.

Attard also worked as a lawyer for Coudert Bros in Moscow from 2003 to 2004. She was the founding editor of The Global Mail for a few months in early 2012.

In June 2016 Attard was appointed head of journalism at Macleay College and took up the position in September that year. Her appointment as professor and Head of Journalism at the University of Technology Sydney faculty of Arts and Social Sciences was announced in February 2018. She will replace Peter Fray in July 2018.

In 2019, Attard was a judge for the 2019 Voyager Media Awards in New Zealand.

== Personal life ==
While working in Moscow, Attard met Russian-born Gregory ("Grisha") Klumov, whom she married in 1993. Klumov was later appointed Australia's Senior Trade Representative to Moscow in 2003. They have one son, Sasha.

== Awards and honours ==
- Gold Walkley Award for Excellence in Journalism 1991
- Walkley Awards both for Best International Report (all Media) and Best Coverage of a Current Story (Radio) 1991
- Medal of the Order of Australia (OAM) in 1992 for services to the community as a radio correspondent while working in Russia.
- Walkley Award for Bcast Interviewing for 'Kernot, Beazley and The Bishop' 2002
- Walkley Award for Bcast Interviewing for 'on the Brink' 2005

Media offices
Preceded by Liz Jackson	Presenter of Media Watch; 2006–2007	Succeeded by Jonathan Holmes
