= Richard Moran (camera operator) =

Australian camera operator

Richard Moran is an Australian camera operator, best known for his work with the Nine Network's news service.

In 2003, Moran was awarded the Gold Walkley for his work during the 2003 Canberra bushfires. Moran became the first television camera operator to win the prestigious award, which is usually presented to reporters.
