= John Lewis (journalist) =

John Lewis (born 1933) was an Australian journalist and wine connoisseur.

Beginning his career with a cadetship at the Armidale Express, Lewis briefly worked at The Daily Advertiser in Wagga Wagga, before taking up a position at The Newcastle Sun.

While at The Newcastle Sun, Lewis began his long-running wine column in 1976. When he transferred across to The Newcastle Herald in 1979, Lewis continued the column which continues to be published twice weekly.

At the 1981 Walkley Awards, Lewis was awarded the Gold Walkley for a series of articles detailing the takeover battle for NBN Television.
