= The Miners Advocate and Northumberland Recorder =

Newspaper in New South Wales, Australia

Miners Advocate and Northumberland Recorder
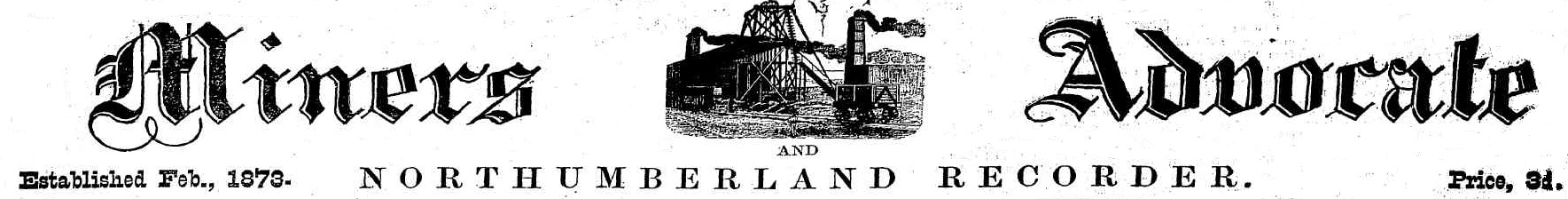
- Type: Broadsheet
- Founder(s): John Miller Sweet
- Founded: 13 December 1873
- Language: English
- Ceased publication: 3 April 1876
- Headquarters: Wallsend, New South Wales
- Free online archives: https://nla.gov.au/nla.news-title355 National Library of Australia

The Miners Advocate and Northumberland Recorder was a bi-weekly English language newspaper published in Newcastle, New South Wales.

== History ==
The newspaper was first published in 1873 by founder John Miller Sweet. It was one of two newspapers published in the area, The Newcastle Chronicle and Hunter River District News being the other.

The paper ceased publication in 1876, coinciding with the commencement of The Newcastle Herald (originally published as the Newcastle Morning Herald and Miners Advocate).

== Archives ==
The newspaper is available on microfilm at the State Library of New South Wales. On 11 Feb 2014, the National Library of Australia, under its Newspaper Digitisation Program, began adding issues to its digital collection.

== See also ==
- List of newspapers in Australia
