= Adele Ferguson =

Australian investigative journalist

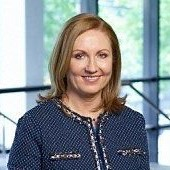
Adele Ferguson

Adele Ferguson AM is an Australian investigative journalist, best known for her series of exposés of malfeasance in the franchising, aged care, and financial services sectors in Australia which have resulted in major inquiries including the Hayne Royal Commission.

== Career ==
After graduating from the University of Adelaide with degrees in economics and arts, Ferguson began a cadetship at The Advertiser newspaper. She then worked at Business Review Weekly magazine as senior business correspondent, and as business writer for The Australian newspaper. In 2009, she joined Fairfax Media as senior business writer and columnist for The Sydney Morning Herald and The Age.

In July 2012, Ferguson released Gina Rinehart: The Untold Story of the Richest Woman in the World, an unauthorised biography of mining magnate Gina Rinehart. Rinehart's lawyers issued a subpoena for Ferguson to produce source material relating to Rinehart's son, John Hancock. The subpoena was dismissed by the Supreme Court of Western Australia, with Rinehart ordered to pay Ferguson's legal costs.

Since 2014, Ferguson has worked on several joint investigations with the ABC's Four Corners program. The first, "Banking Bad", described "unconscionable banking practices" in the Commonwealth Bank and other Australian banks, and won the Gold Walkley award. Subsequent collaborations alleged wage fraud in the 7-Eleven, Domino's Pizza, Retail Food Group and Caltex franchises.

For her work in exposing corporate governance malpractices in the financial sector, the Institute of Certified Management Accountants, Australia inducted Ferguson to the Global Management Accounting Hall of Fame in 2019.

In 2023, she joined the ABC and as of February 2025 is working at 7.30. She also works at Four Corners.

== Awards and honours ==
In 2014, Ferguson (along with ABC collaborators Deb Masters and Mario Christodoulou) won the Gold Walkley award for their story "Banking Bad" about the financial planning and advice services of the Commonwealth Bank.

Also in 2014, Ferguson won Journalist of the Year at the Kennedy Awards.

Ferguson was made a Member of the Order of Australia in the 2019 Australia Day Honours, for significant service to the print and broadcast media as a journalist and business commentator.

Banking Bad was shortlisted for the 2020 Davitt Award for best nonfiction crime book and best debut crime book.

== Publications ==
- Ferguson, Adele (2012). Gina Rinehart : the untold story of the richest person in Australian history. Sydney, N.S.W.: Pan Macmillan Australia. ISBN 978-1-74261-097-9. OCLC 781690232.
- Ferguson, Adele (2019). Banking Bad: Whistleblowers. Corporate cover-ups. One journalist's fight for the truth. Sydney, N.S.W.: HarperCollins. ISBN 978-0-7333-4011-6. OCLC 1101395487.
