= Solomon Islands Labour Party =

- Leader: Joses Tuhanuku
- Founder: Solomon Islands Council of Trade Unions
- Founded: November 1988
- Dissolved: c. 2007
- Ideology: Labourism; Federalism

The Solomon Islands Labour Party was a political party in Solomon Islands. The party was founded in 1988 by the Solomon Islands Council of Trade Unions after the leadership of the union split. Joses Tuhanuku went on to lead the Labour Party, while Bartholomew Ulufa'alu led the Solomon Islands Liberal Party. Tuhanuku would be an MP for the party starting in 1989.

The party participated in government from 1993 until 1994 and then in the Solomon Islands Alliance for Change government from 1997 to 2000.

Tuhanuku lost his seat in 2006 and the party has contested no parliamentary elections since then.
