= Tim Palmer (journalist) =

Australian journalist

Tim Palmer is an Australian journalist, best known for his work as a foreign correspondent with the Australian Broadcasting Corporation.

In 2005, Palmer won the Gold Walkley. The award was in recognition of Palmer's reporting in South Asia, which included covering the Aceh tsunami, the Nias Island helicopter crash, the Jakarta embassy bombing and the Bali bombings.
