= Linton Besser =

Australian journalist (born 1976/77)

- Born: 1976 or 1977
- Education: Moriah College
- Occupation: Journalist
- Employer: ABC Television
- Spouse: Married
- Children: 2

Linton Besser (born 1976 or 1977) is an Australian investigative journalist. In 2025 he took over as host of the long-running Media Watch show on ABC TV. He has won numerous awards in journalism, including four Walkley Awards, two Kennedy Awards, and a George Munster Award.

== Early life and education ==
Linton Besser was born in 1976 or 1977 to Jewish parents, Anne and Mike Besser. His grandparents, Sara Weintraub and Wolf Besser, were Holocaust survivors who were interned at Auschwitz concentration camp during World War II.

He was educated at Moriah College in Sydney.

== Career ==
In 2003, Besser began his media career as a producer for morning TV program Today. Then, after a stint at rural and regional papers, he moved to the Sydney Morning Herald in 2007. While there, he won a 2010 Walkley Award for Investigative Journalism for his story "The Wrong Stuff", on misspending by the Department of Defence; and (with Kate McClymont) a Walkley and a George Munster Award for the 2012 investigative series "The Obeid family business", followed by a 2013 Kennedy Award for Scoop of the Year. The pair released the best-selling book He Who must Be Obeid in 2014; its first print run was pulped due to incorrectly identifying one person as another. The book was a finalist at the 2015 Ned Kelly Awards.

Having moved to the ABC in 2013, he reported for Four Corners between 2014 and 2018. During his tenure, he won a second Kennedy Award in 2014, for Outstanding Consumer Affairs Reporting with Janine Cohen and Mario Christodoulou, and a 2016 Walkley Television/Audio Visual Current Affairs Award for "State of Fear", along with cinematographer Louie Eroglu, producer Jaya Balendra and researcher Elise Worthington. During that investigation, Besser and Eroglu were arrested in Malaysia for trying to question Prime Minister Najib Razak over the 1MDB scandal, but were released without charge several days later.

From 2018 until 2021 he was the ABC's Europe Correspondent, after which he returned to providing investigative reporting for ABC News, including programs 7.30, AM, and Four Corners.

In 2024, Besser and Nina Kopel received the Walkley Business Journalism Award for their strata management industry investigation.

In November 2024 it was announced that from 2025 he would be the new host of ABC's long-running Media Watch program.

== Personal life ==
As of 2013, he was married with two children.

== See also ==
- List of investigative journalists

Media offices
Preceded by Paul Barry	Presenter of Media Watch; 2025–present	Incumbent
