= Newcastle Herald =

Newspaper in Newcastle, NSW, Australia

- Front page of the Newcastle Herald (24 October 2025)
- Type: Daily newspaper
- Format: Tabloid
- Owner: Australian Community Media
- Editor: Lisa Allan
- Founded: 1858; 168 years ago
- Political alignment: Mixed
- Headquarters: Newcastle, New South Wales
- Website: www.newcastleherald.com.au

The Newcastle Herald (formerly branded as The Herald) is a local tabloid newspaper published daily, Monday to Saturday, in Newcastle, New South Wales, Australia. It is the only local newspaper that serves the greater Hunter Region and Central Coast region six days a week. It is owned by Australian Community Media.

In a Roy Morgan report published in 2023, the Newcastle Herald (between 2020 and 2021) had a combined print and digital audience above 540,000.

== Overview ==
The Newcastle Herald is the largest local news agency in the Hunter region. It is also well read in Sydney (with readership figures showing a 20% increase in Sydney readership on Saturdays) and interstate.

The paper features the only classifieds section published six days a week across the region.

The Newcastle Herald employs more than 310 full-time staff.

== History ==
The Newcastle Herald had its origins in two early newspapers, The Newcastle Chronicle and Hunter River District News and The Miners Advocate and Northumberland Recorder.

Established in 1858, the Chronicle began as a weekly journal carrying mining, shipping, court and some small items of local news. It cost just sixpence. In the years that followed it took on more of the appearance of a newspaper, became a bi-weekly and then tri-weekly, and by 1876 its last edition was priced at two pence.

Some of the paper's first articles document the Newcastle Earthquake of 1868, riots, severe storms and the sinking of Cawarra, the worst shipwreck in Newcastle's history that claimed the lives of sixty passengers on the Brisbane-bound passenger ship. It was also during the paper's infant years that the Newcastle rail line was extended to Watt Street (1858), Newcastle became a municipality (1859), the Miners' Federation was formed (1860) and gas lighting was introduced to the city (1875).

In 1873 in Nelson St, Plattsburg (now part of Wallsend), The Miners Advocate and Northumberland Recorder was first published. Under the guidance of founder John Miller Sweet, the paper flourished and by 1876 it was a tri-weekly selling for three pence and with a circulation of 4,000 copies a week.

John Sweet's father-in-law, James Fletcher, believed the region was ready for a bigger newspaper published daily and persuaded his son-in-law to expand. The Advocate moved to Bolton Street, Newcastle, and on 3 April 1876, the first copies of The Newcastle Morning Herald and Miners Advocate were published. The first Herald and Advocate masthead was ornate and carried a sketch of a colliery pit-top, including poppet head and chimney. Such ornate mastheads stayed with The Herald for 104 years, the last major change being on 6 October 1980, when a more modern and simpler masthead was introduced, dropping the "Morning" and "Miners Advocate" from the title.

As with the Chronicle the first years of The Newcastle Morning Herald and Miners Advocate were to be also marred by tragedy. Some of the first stories printed by the newly named paper included the sinking of Yarra Yarra off Newcastle with no survivors, a fire in Scott Street, deaths at the Greta coal mine, coal strikes and the beginning of the Boer War. Among other stories of local importance were the sinking of the Newcastle-Stockton ferry Bluebell (The Bluebell Collision) in 1934, The Newcastle Tragedy of 1927 and the Japanese attack on the city's East End and dockyards in 1942.

=== Move to tabloid ===
In July 1998, the newspaper rebranded itself as "the compact with impact" after going tabloid in size. According to the newspaper's proponents the move to tabloid was an immediate success, and the newspaper's circulation has grown more than 21 per cent since then. Others have argued that the paper's journalism values suffered and that the paper had become more sensationalist and less analytical as a result. As the Newcastle Herald was one of the first Australian newspapers to switch from broadsheet to tabloid, the paper is often cited as an example when other Australian newspapers are contemplating or alleged to be contemplating a similar move.

=== Merger ===
In mid-2008, the paper was forced to sell its free weekly Post publication to Newcastle Jets FC owner Con Constantine following the merger between Fairfax Media and Rural Press. Rural Press owned the competing Star newspaper and the Australian Competition & Consumer Commission ruled that the conglomerate was not allowed to own two such similar publications. The Star ceased publication in April 2020 due to a drop in advertising revenue as a result of the COVID-19 pandemic.

Title	Dates	ISSN	Notes
The Newcastle Chronicle and Hunter River District News	1858–1876	2200-6893	
The Newcastle Chronicle	28 July 1866–15 July 1876	2200-6915	
The Miners Advocate and Northumberland Recorder	13 December 1873–3 April 1876	2200-6958	Publication's cessation coincided with the commencement of the title below
The Newcastle Morning Herald and Miners Advocate	[5 April 1876]–no. 24,407 (31 December 1954)	2200-6966	
The Newcastle herald	6 October 1980–31 May 2003	0727-9825	
The herald (Newcastle, N.S.W.)	2 June 2003–25 June 2010	2202-8013	
[absorbed title] The herald: Central Coast	2 June 2003–12 June 2004		Previously known as Central Coast herald (28 September 2002-31 May 2003). Absorbed by Newcastle
Newcastle herald: voice of the Hunter	26 June 2010–	2202-8013	

== Awards ==
Two Herald writers have won the Gold Walkley, the most prestigious of the Walkley Awards for Australian journalism. John Lewis won in 1981 for his articles on the attempted takeover of NBN Television, while Joanne McCarthy won in 2013 for her work on child sexual abuse in the Catholic Church.

== Endorsements ==
Election	Endorsement
2025	Labor

== See also ==
- List of newspapers in Australia
