= Australia national rugby union team coaches =

List of coaches

== Coaches ==
#	Coach	Time	P	W	L	D	%
1	(Australia) Bryan Palmer	1962; 1967	4	0	4	0	0.00
2	Alan Roper	1962–1967	20	8	12	0	40.00
3	Des Connor	1968–1971	14	2	12	0	14.29
4	Bob Templeton	1971–1973; 1976; 1979–1982	29	13	16	0	44.83
5	David Brockhoff	1974–1975; 1979	15	7	8	0	46.67
6	Daryl Haberecht	1978	5	3	2	0	60.00
7	Bob Dwyer	1982–1983; 1988–1995	73	46	26	1	63.01
8	Alan Jones	1984–1987	30	21	8	1	70.00
9	Greg Smith	1996–1997	19	12	7	0	63.16
10	Rod Macqueen	1997–2001	43	34	8	1	79.07
11	Eddie Jones	2001–2005	57	33	23	1	57.89
12	John Connolly	2006–2007	25	16	8	1	64.00
13	Robbie Deans	2008–2013	75	44	29	2	58.67
14	Ewen McKenzie	2013–2014	22	11	10	1	50.00
15	Michael Cheika	2014–2019	68	34	32	2	50.00
16	Dave Rennie	2020–2023	33	12	18	3	36.36
(11)	Eddie Jones	2023	9	2	7	0	22.22
17	Joe Schmidt	2024-2026	31	12	19	0	38.71

== Sources ==
- "Wallabies coaches since 1962: Part I". The Roar. 9 August 2011.
- "Wallabies coaches since 1962: Part II". The Roar. 10 August 2011.
- ABC News. "Australian Rugby Union confirms Robbie Deans 'stood down' from Wallabies job on Monday". ABC. News.
- ESPN Staff. "Australia: Ewen McKenzie resigns from Wallabies role - Live Rugby News - ESPN Scrum". ESPN scrum.
- "Wallabies beat Barbarians 40-36 to kick off European Rugby Tour and Michael Cheika's tenure". ABC News.
- "Wallabies win "significant fight" for Rennie's services, confident the Kiwi will prove his passion for Australian rugby". rugby.com.au.
- ESPN Scrum Statsguru
