= Richard Ackland =

Australian journalist, publisher, lawyer

Richard Alan Ackland AM
- Born: Sydney, Australia
- Education: University of Sydney
- Occupations: Journalist; publisher; lawyer; TV personality
- Years active: 1970s–present
- Employer: Guardian Australia
- Spouse: Married
- Children: 3

Richard Alan Ackland AM is an Australian journalist, publisher and lawyer, who has won many awards for his reporting.

Ackland graduated with degrees in economics and law and was admitted by the Supreme Court of New South Wales as a lawyer before going on to pursue a career in journalism.

== Early life and education ==
Ackland attended Cranbrook School and St Andrews College at the University of Sydney and later Macquarie University. He was enlisted in the Royal Australian Naval Reserve for five years.

== Career ==
His first job was as a finance journalist at the Daily Telegraph in Sydney. Later he worked for Maxwell Newton's economic and financial publications in Canberra and then for the Australian Financial Review during the 1970s.

In 1979, he founded his law publishing company, Law Press of Australia, and since then has continued to be the publisher of two important Australian legal journals, Justinian and the Gazette of Law and Journalism. Ackland also publishes a newsletter on politics, media and the law, Spilled Ink.

He worked for the Australian Broadcasting Corporation (ABC) in the 1980s, first as the presenter of the ABC Radio National breakfast program, Daybreak. He was the founding host of Radio National's discussion program Late Night Live. Subsequently, from 1998 to 1999, Ackland was the writer and presenter for the ABC-TV show Media Watch. During this time he was awarded a Gold Walkley together with colleagues Deborah Richards and Anne Connolly for their expose of the notorious cash for comment affair.

Ackland was the legal columnist for Fairfax Media and edited and published the online journal Justinian. Ackland stopped being employed as a regular columnist by Fairfax in June 2014 to write for The Guardian and The Saturday Paper.

In 2016 he was appointed a Member of the Order of Australia for significant service to the print and television media industries, particularly through reporting on legal issues, and as a publisher.

In September 2016 he was awarded a Doctor of Letters (honoris causa) by Macquarie University.

== Personal life ==
Ackland is married to his wife. He has three children, one of whom works as an actor.

Media offices
Preceded by Stuart Littlemore	Presenter of Media Watch; 1998–1999	Succeeded by Paul Barry
