= The Times (TV program) =

Australian television series

- Genre: Current affairs
- Presented by: Paul Barry
- Country of origin: Australia
- Original language: English

Original release
- Network: Seven Network
- Release: March 1994 – November 1995

The Times is an Australian midweek current affairs program hosted by Paul Barry that was broadcast on the Seven Network. It aired from March 1994 until November 1995.

== Overview ==
It began in March 1994 airing late night on Wednesdays, and included regular contributions from Neil Mercer, and Seven's senior Canberra reporter, Glenn Milne. The program later moved to Sunday nights where it would screen after the Sunday night movie, and then in August 1995 it moved to Tuesday nights.

Unlike most current affairs programs, The Times made heavy use of short cuts, subtitles and fast-paced music, resulting in an energetic style aimed at younger viewers.

It was axed in November 1995, but the program's staff moved on to work on the new 10:30 pm news bulletin hosted by Anne Fulwood.

== See also ==
- List of Australian television series
