= Mary-Louise O'Callaghan =

Australian journalist and author

- Occupations: Journalist, author
- Spouse: Joses Tuhanuku
- Awards: Gold Walkley, Walkley Award

Mary-Louise O'Callaghan is an Australian journalist and author.

She was The Guardian's stringer in China from 1983 to 1985. She was then the South Pacific correspondent for Fairfax Media from 1987 to 1995, and then for The Australian from 1995 to 2004. She later worked as the public affairs manager for the Regional Assistance Mission to Solomon Islands (RAMSI). She was based in the Solomon Islands from 1989, remaining there for 25 years.

In 1997, O'Callaghan won both the Gold Walkley award and a Walkley Award for International Reporting for her coverage of what would become known as the Sandline affair. In February 1997, O'Callaghan broke the story in the Weekend Australian that the Papua New Guinean government had secretly hired foreign mercenaries to fight in the Bougainville Civil War. The subsequent fallout brought down the government of Prime Minister Julius Chan. She subsequently wrote a book on the subject, Enemies Within: Papua New Guinea, Australia, and the Sandline Crisis: The Inside Story, in 1998. She later won a third Walkley Award for Best Radio Feature, along with Philip Adam and Chris Bullock, for an ABC Radio National Late Night Live series on the Solomon Islands.

She was the Public Affairs lead at World Vision Australia from 2013 to 2019.

O'Callaghan is married to Solomon Islander politician and trade unionist Joses Tuhanuku. They have four children together.
