= Gary Hughes (journalist) =

Australian journalist

Gary Hughes is an Australian journalist.

In 2009, Hughes was awarded the Gold Walkley and named Australian Journalist of the Year for his coverage of Victoria's Black Saturday bushfires, of which he was a victim, for The Australian.

During the disaster Hughes and his wife almost died as their home burned around them. His first hand account gained global attention. Hughes later wrote an open letter to Australian Prime Minister Kevin Rudd, detailing the distress Centrelink staff were causing to bushfire victims by telling them they needed identification to access emergency financial assistance despite their homes being completely destroyed by fire. This prompted Federal Government ministers Joe Ludwig and Jenny Macklin to advise Centrelink to treat bushfire victims more leniently.

Hughes has spoken publicly of his experiences during the Black Saturday fires a number of times. During one interview, Hughes admitted that when fellow bushfire victims were abusing and spitting at him and other members of the media as they passed them at a police roadblock while fleeing the bushfire ravaged area, he began to feel conflicted about the role journalists perform in relation to how they treat victims of trauma.

As an investigative journalist, Hughes has won numerous awards, including three previous Walkley Awards and two Melbourne Press Club Quills.
