= The Newcastle Chronicle and Hunter River District News =

Australian periodical

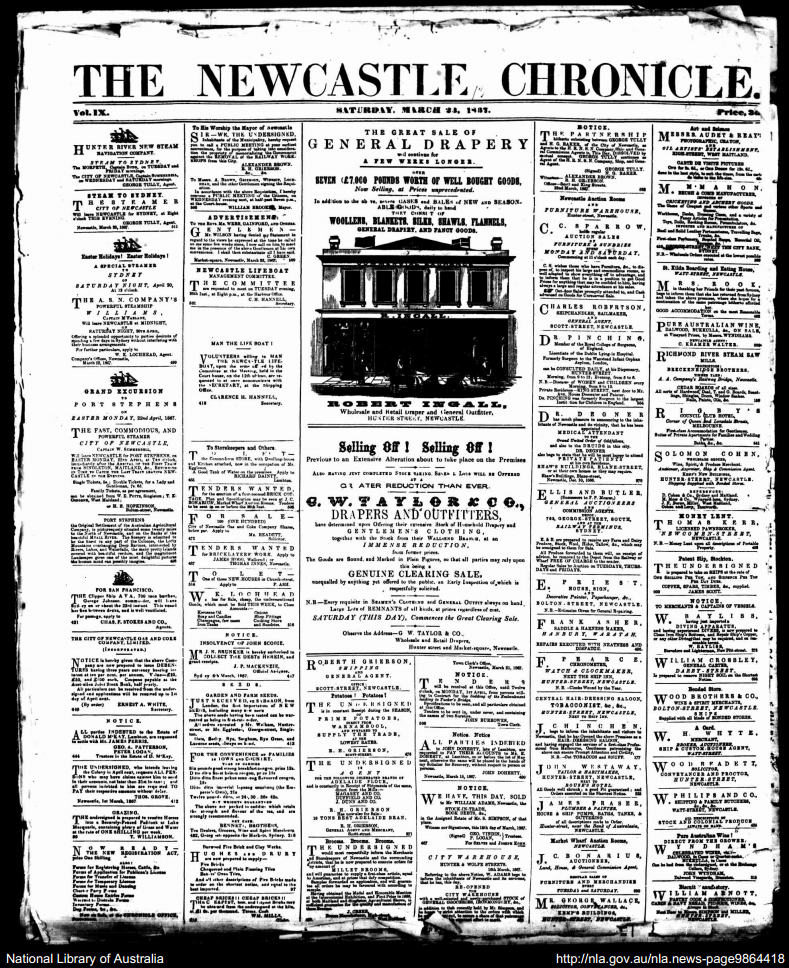
- Front page of The Newcastle Chronicle on 23 March 1867
- Type: Weekly (Saturday), then Bi-weekly (Wednesday, Saturday) from 1861, then Tri-weekly (Tuesday, Thursday and Saturday) from 1862
- Format: Broadsheet
- Founder(s): Hugh M'Dicken and James Baker
- Founded: 21 August 1858
- Political alignment: Liberal, Independent
- Language: English
- Ceased publication: 1876 merged into Newcastle Morning Herald and Miners Advocate.
- Headquarters: Newcastle, New South Wales
- Website: https://www.newcastleherald.com.au/
- Free online archives: http://nla.gov.au/nla.news-title353 From 1866

The Newcastle Chronicle and Hunter River District News (also published as the Newcastle Chronicle) was a weekly English language newspaper published in Newcastle, New South Wales.

== History ==
The newspaper was first published in 1858. It was originally published weekly but was later published more frequently, moving to biweekly and then triweekly editions. From 1866 to 1876 it was published as the Newcastle Chronicle.

The paper ceased publication in 1876, with the commencement of The Newcastle Morning Herald and Miners Advocate. The Herald also replaced the Miners Advocate and Northumberland Recorder which had commenced publication in 1873.

In November 1875, William Aubrey Burnage became a partner in the business. In January of the following year Hugh M'Dicken sold his share in the partnership to Burnage, leaving Burnage as sole proprietor.

== Archives ==
The newspaper is available on microfilm at the State Library of New South Wales. It has been digitised by the National Library of Australia under its Newspaper Digitisation Program.

== See also ==
- List of newspapers in Australia
