= Solomon Islands Council of Trade Unions =

SICTU
- Solomon Islands Council of Trade Unions
- Founded: 1986
- Headquarters: Honiara
- Location: Solomon Islands
- Key people: Tony Kagovai, General Secretary

The Solomon Islands Council of Trade Unions (SICTU) is a national trade union center in the Solomon Islands.

It was created in 1986 by the Solomon Islands National Union of Workers (formerly the Solomon Islands General Workers' Union prior to independence) and had membership of over 90% of Solomon Islands trade unions.

In 1988 SICTU set up the Solomon Islands Labour Party.
