= Jonathan Holmes (journalist) =

Jonathon Holmes
- Born: England
- Occupations: Media correspondent; TV journalist; actor; producer
- Employer: Nine Entertainment
- Known for: Media Columnist for The Age, Sydney Morning Herald
- Notable work: Executive Producer (EP) of Four Corners (1982-1985); Executive producer Foreign Correspondent (1992-1993); Executive producer The 7.30 Report(2001-2002)

Jonathan Holmes is an English-born Australian newspaper and former television journalist, actor and producer who was the presenter of the ABC1 weekly programme Media Watch from 2008 until July 2013.

== Life ==
In 1969, Holmes graduated from the University of Cambridge.

At 21, in 1969, as one who "affects theatrical sideburns and Nehru suits", wrote an open letter to Prince Charles, in the American magazine, TIME.

In 1990, Holmes became an Australian citizen.

== Career ==
In 1969, Holmes's television career began, in Britain, as a BBC trainee, then worked in the Current Affairs Group, on 24 Hours, Nationwide, and five years on Panorama.

In 1982, he was hired by the Australian Broadcasting Corporation to become the executive producer of Four Corners, the ABC's flagship current affairs programme. He was executive producer of Four Corners from 1982 to 1985, of Foreign Correspondent (1992–93), and The 7.30 Report (2001–02). From 1998 to 2000, he was the ABC's foreign correspondent in Washington, D.C. He returned to Four Corners as a reporter in January 2003. From 2007, Holmes was the Media Watch presenter.

"To put it bluntly, there's evidence, and there's bulldust. It's a journalist's job to distinguish between them, not to sit on the fence and bleat ‘balance’." - Jonathan Holmes, 2012, on Media Watch

In 1988, he wrote, produced and narrated the award-winning documentary film Hoddle Street, about the 1987 Hoddle Street massacre.

As of June 2021, Holmes is a media columnist for The Age and The Sydney Morning Herald.

== Awards and honours ==
- Finalist in the Walkley Awards four times.
- Banff World Television Festival top prize 1988 for Hoddle Street.
- Holmes won a 1998 Logie Award for a Foreign Correspondent TV special report on the Balibo Five (with assistant producer Jill Jolliffe).
- Awarded Silver Award "for sustained excellence over a quarter of a century" by the United Nations Association of Australia (2003).

Media offices
| Preceded by Monica Attard | Presenter of Media Watch; 2008–2013 | Succeeded by Paul Barry |
