= Alan Jones (talkback host) =

Australian right-wing commentator and former talkback host

Alan Jones AO
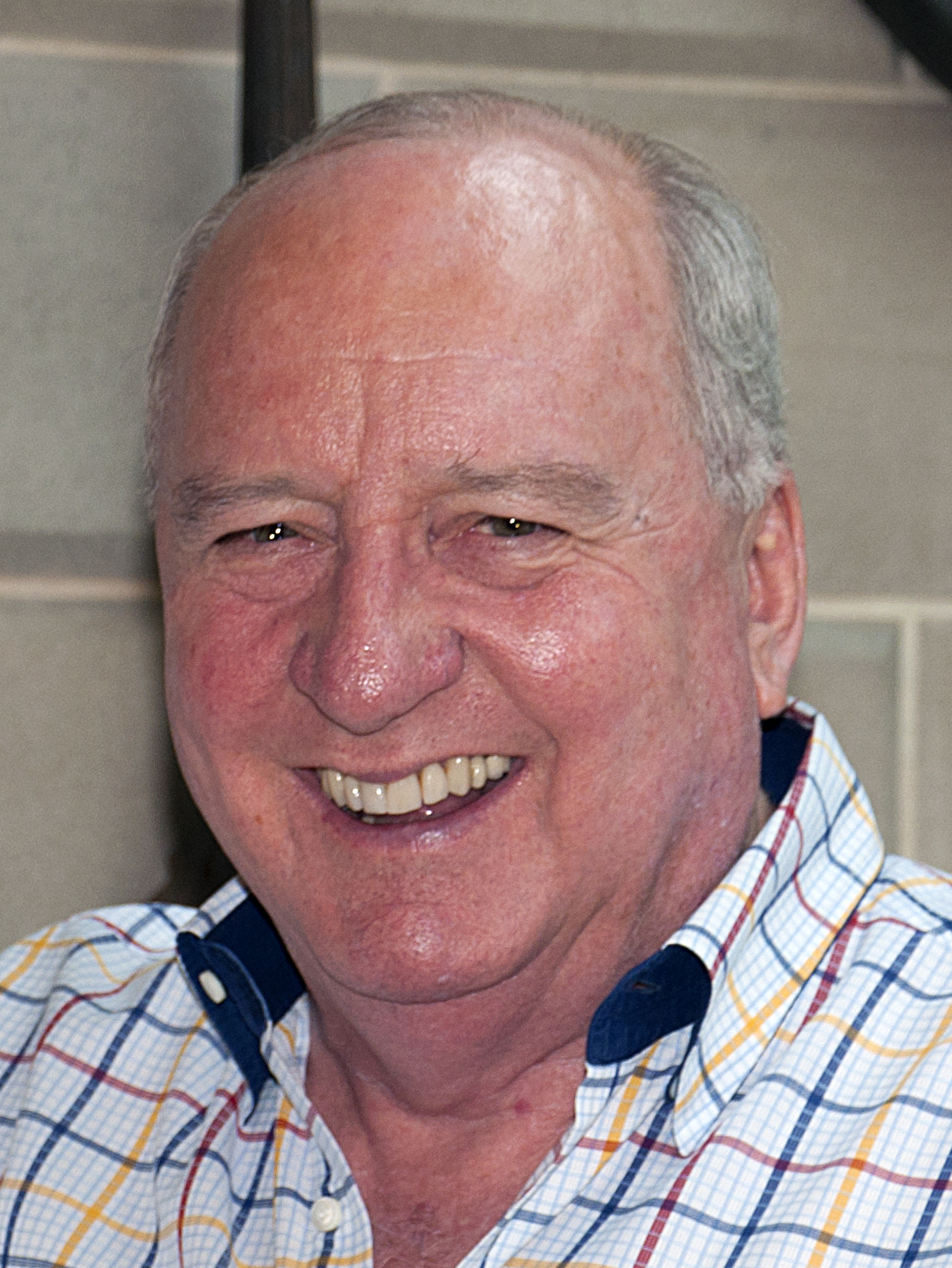
- Jones in 2011
- Born: Alan Belford Jones; 13 April 1941 (age 85) Oakey, Queensland, Australia
- School: Toowoomba Grammar School
- University: Kelvin Grove Teachers College; University of Queensland; University of Oxford
- Occupation: Radio presenter

Rugby union career
Coaching career
- Years: Team
- 1983: Manly Marlins
- 1984–87: Australia
- 2017: Barbarians
- Rugby league career

Coaching information
Club
Years	Team	Gms	W	D	L	W%
1991–93	Balmain Tigers	66	24	3	39	36

Alan Belford Jones (born 13 April 1941) is an Australian former talkback host, coach of the Australia national rugby union team, and rugby league coach and administrator. He has worked as a school teacher, a speech writer in the office of Prime Minister Malcolm Fraser, and in musical theatre. He has a Bachelor of Arts degree from the University of Queensland and completed a one-year teaching diploma at Worcester College, Oxford. He has received civil and industry awards.

Jones hosted a popular Sydney breakfast radio program on radio station 2GB from 2002 until 2020. Jones advocates rightwing views, and the popularity of his radio program has made him a highly paid and influential media personality in Australia. Despite his success, he remains a controversial figure. His on-air conduct has received adverse findings from Australia's media regulators, and he has frequently been sued for defamation. In May 2020 Jones announced his retirement from his role at 2GB. In November 2021 it was confirmed that his contract with Sky News Australia would not be renewed. Since December 2021 Jones has presented Alan Jones: Direct to the People on ADH TV.

In November 2024 Jones was arrested and charged with twenty-six offences against eight alleged victims between 2001 and 2019, including aggravated indecent assault, assault with an act of indecency, sexually touching another person without consent, and common assault. The youngest alleged was 17 at the time. Two more indecent assault charges (relating to a ninth alleged victim) were laid in November, followed by an additional eight charges (relating to a tenth alleged victim) in December. On 18 December 2024 Jones pleaded not guilty to all charges. On 7 March 2025 Jones was charged with an additional count of indecent assault, relating to an eleventh alleged victim. Some charges have since been withdrawn; Jones went on trial in early August 2026 on charges concerning eight complainants and incidents alleged to have occurred between 2003 and 2019.

== Early life and career ==
Jones was born to farmer and coal miner Charlie Thomas (1906–90) and former school teacher Elizabeth ("Beth", née Belford; 1906–82). He was the middle of three children, with an older brother, Robert Charles, and a younger sister, Colleen, all of whom would become school teachers like their mother. Jones was raised on a dairy farm near Oakey in south-east Queensland, attending primary school at Acland State School, before transferring to Toowoomba Grammar School as a boarder.

After leaving school Jones trained as a teacher at the Kelvin Grove Teachers College (now part of the Queensland University of Technology) in Brisbane. In 1961, he started his teaching career at a state primary school, Ironside State School in the inner suburbs of Brisbane. In 1963 he obtained a position at Brisbane Grammar School, a private secondary school for boys, where he remained until the end of 1969. Throughout this period he also studied part-time at the University of Queensland for a Bachelor of Arts degree, which he was awarded in 1967. Apart from his teaching duties at Brisbane Grammar, Jones additionally proved to be a highly successful sporting coach in athletics, tennis, and, later, rugby union.

In 1970 Jones was appointed Senior English Master at The King's School, Parramatta in Sydney. Again Jones was also heavily involved in coaching a number of sports with considerable success, including progressing to coaching the First XV rugby union side, which he took to the championship in an unbeaten season in 1974. At the end of the first term in 1975, following a meeting with the school's principal, Jones chose to resign from the school. It has been reported that reasons for his resignation include his divisiveness and his inappropriate relationships with students.

After leaving King's School Jones briefly moved to Canberra where he made a failed bid to win preselection to stand as a Country Party candidate for federal parliament. He then spent several years as the manager of a small airline in Quirindi in country New South Wales, where he also coached the local rugby team. During this same period, over 1976–77 while in his mid-30s, Jones spent time in England where he completed a one-year diploma in educational studies at Worcester College, Oxford. While at Oxford Jones won a university Blue for tennis.

In 1978 Jones returned to Sydney to run for the state parliament as a candidate for the Liberal Party, a centre-right party. After failing to win his seat in the election, Jones worked for some time as a speechwriter for the Liberal New South Wales opposition leader, John Mason. In 1979 Jones was recruited as a speechwriter for the Liberal Prime Minister of Australia, Malcolm Fraser, so returned to Canberra for the position, remaining there until early 1981. He then moved back to Sydney after being recruited to be executive director of the New South Wales Employers' Federation, where he worked until he began his radio career in 1985.

In October 1985 Jones was awarded the Rostrum Speakers' Award as the Communicator of the Year.

== Political aspirations ==
In 1974 a parent at The King's School, Parramatta, Doug Anthony, leader of the Country Party (now the National Party of Australia) in the Australian Parliament, offered Jones a position with the party in Canberra. In 1975 Jones sought party preselection as the candidate for the Federal parliamentary seat of Eden-Monaro, but lost the bid.

In 1978 he was the candidate for the July 1978 by-election for the New South Wales state seat of Earlwood for the Liberal Party, formerly held by deposed Liberal leader Sir Eric Willis. He lost what had been considered a "safe seat". Jones again contested the seat for the Liberal Party at the 1978 New South Wales state election held in October; the Australian Labor Party candidate was returned with a greater majority.

In September 1979 Jones stood for Liberal preselection for the federal Division of North Sydney, placing third in the ballot. The winning candidate, Peter Solomon, was later disendorsed, but Jones did not recontest the ballot in March 1980, with John Spender taking preselection and winning the seat.

In 1986 Jones nominated for the Liberal preselection for the federal Division of Wentworth in Sydney, but was a late withdrawal from the ballot; the preselection and seat was won by future Liberal leader John Hewson.

== Coaching career ==
=== Rugby union ===
1982 was the beginning of Jones's association with semi-professional rugby. His first appointment was as (part-time) manager of the NSW Rugby Union team. The next year he served as coach for the Manly Rugby Union team, winning the Shute Shield competition for the first time in 32 years.

In February 1984 Jones replaced Bob Dwyer as coach of the Australia national rugby union team (the Wallabies). Jones coached the Australian team for 4 years with 86 victories from 102 matches including 23 victories in 30 Tests. When he took the team on it included Mark Ella, and it soon recruited Peter FitzSimons and James Black, both Manly players, and Nick Farr-Jones. Also in 1984, Australia's national team, the Wallabies, won the Grand Slam victories over England, Ireland, Wales and Scotland, and a Barbarians side made up of the best players of those countries and France. In 1985, Jones was awarded Coach of the Year from the Confederation of Australian Sport.

The 1986 Bledisloe Cup victory against New Zealand in New Zealand was the first time that had been achieved in 39 years. In 1988, Jones was made a Member of the Order of Australia for his service to Rugby Union football. In 1989, Jones was elected to the Sport Australia Hall of Fame for his contribution to sport as the Australian rugby union coach.

In October 2007 Jones signalled his interest in coaching the Wallabies after Queensland Rugby Chairman Peter Lewis suggested to the media he was the right person for the job. "If Peter Lewis and the Queensland Rugby Union – who have played a major role in Australian rugby for many years – are of the view I am the person who can make that contribution then I am obligated to put my hand up and say, 'Well if that is the case, I'm available'."

On 14 December 2007 the Australian Rugby Union ruled Jones out of the coaching position, instead appointing New Zealand Crusaders coach Robbie Deans.

In 2017 Jones took up an invitation to coach the Barbarians against the Classic Wallabies in Lismore and the Wallabies in Sydney during the 2017 end-of-year rugby union internationals.

=== Rugby league ===
In 1990 Jones replaced Warren Ryan as coach of the Balmain Tigers rugby league football club, without accepting a fee. Balmain had been quite successful, including coming runners-up in 1988 and 1989 in the New South Wales Rugby League premiership, but with Jones in charge they struggled despite his claims upon appointment that "Balmain are sick and tired of coming second". It was while coaching Balmain that Jones was dubbed with his best known nickname, the 'Parrot', by comedian Greig Pickhaver in his role as sports commentator H.G. Nelson, although Jones has never approved of the name.

Jones coached Balmain from 1991 to 1993 with these results: 1991 (8 wins, 12th place); 1992 (10 wins, 10th place); 1993 (5 wins, 12th place). At the end of the 1993 season he reapplied for the coaching role, offering a new business plan to the board, but when it was rejected he resigned. He was soon after appointed as the Manager of Football Operations with the South Sydney Rabbitohs rugby league club, also without a fee.

== Media career ==
=== Radio ===
In 1985 Jones joined the Sydney AM radio station 2UE as the morning show host after long-time host John Laws left for 2GB. Laws returned to 2UE in 1988 to again host the morning show, so from March of that year Jones was moved to the breakfast slot from 5.30 am to 9.00 am. On changing to the breakfast show, Jones first adopted the program's long-time opening and closing theme music, "Gloria" by Laura Branigan. By the mid-1990s Jones's audience share in the Sydney market was up to 22%, giving him the largest radio audience in Sydney, and including his transmissions into regional and interstate markets, possibly the largest radio audience in Australia.

Jones's program changed little over time, as a mixture of opinion pieces, interviews, talkback, and commercial endorsements. His on-air popularity has made him a highly paid and powerful media personality. Jones uses his program to advocate largely rightwing views, and he has been described as one of the most influential broadcasters in Australia. Throughout his time on radio Jones has frequently been referred to as a 'shock jock' due to the style of his presentation, although he personally rejects this term.

In January 1993 the International Year of the World's Indigenous People, Jones described the choice of Aboriginal Australian Mandawuy Yunupingu as Australian of the Year as "ridiculous" and suggested Yunupingu had been granted the award because of his "colour or ... history". Later that year prominent Aboriginal Australian Charles Perkins and Jones clashed in a live TV and radio debate. Jones said Australians are "getting no say when [Aboriginal people] say this is [their] nation; it's not, it's Australia's nation ... [Average Australians] are being asked to pay taxes to fund people who are seeking title to productive land to which they've made no contribution to its productivity". Perkins called Jones racist and a redneck and commented "You've sat on your white bum at 2UE in Sydney all your life so you wouldn't know what goes on out there".

On seven occasions between 1990 and 1997, Jones was awarded by Commercial Radio Australia the title Australian Radio Talk Personality of the Year. In 2001 Jones was awarded the Centenary Medal and the Australian Sports Medal, both being awarded for his contributions to sport and the broadcasting industry.

In 2002 Jones switched to 2GB as breakfast announcer, reportedly also taking a financial interest in the station.

In 2008 Jones's audience numbers began to fall, with competition from ABC Radio 702, though he retained his number one position. In 2011, Jones had an audience share of 19.2%, still the largest for a radio commentator in Sydney. In 2012 Jones retained the largest share, with 18.5% of the Sydney radio audience, although this represented an average number of listeners of just 151,000 out of a listening audience of 469,000 and a possible Sydney audience of 4.1 million, and was down from 185,000 in 2006 despite an increase in population. In February 2013, his audience share dropped to 15.4%.

In November 2014 Jones celebrated having the highest share in Sydney breakfast radio for 100 consecutive radio rating surveys.

In May 2020 Jones announced he would retire from his role at 2GB at the end of that month. He cited ill health, however some news outlets have stated that it was a forced resignation after making controversial comments about New Zealand Prime Minister Jacinda Ardern the previous year cost his breakfast program large sums of money from advertisers. Some of that revenue has never returned.

=== Print ===
Jones's first regular position in the media was to write a column called "The Way I See It" for the Quirindi Advocate newspaper from November 1977 until February 1978. From 1988 until 1990 Jones wrote a regular column for the Sydney Sunday tabloid The Sun-Herald, but did not appear following a petition by staff calling for his removal as a contributor. This followed Jones's publication of a column predicting an oil crisis, in which a large amount of material had been taken from Frederick Forsyth's novel The Negotiator without attribution or indication that their source was a work of fiction. Jones was later hired by the Sun-Herald's rival paper, The Sunday Telegraph, where he wrote a one-page column titled "To the Point" until 1995.

Since the 1980s Jones has frequently been the subject of profile pieces in newspapers and magazines throughout the country, which have ranged in style from complimentary to investigatory and critical.

=== Television ===
At the end of January 1994 Jones debuted in his own Network Ten program, Alan Jones Live, intended to be similar in purpose and content to the American program Larry King Live. Proving to be a ratings failure, it was cancelled in April 1994 after just 13 weeks on air. In March 1995, he began a segment making editorial comment on the Nine Network's Today breakfast show. Jones continued to present this 7.15 am editorial on Today until it was eventually cancelled in June 2007.

From 2013 Jones began co-hosting a political discussion program on Sky News Australia with Graham Richardson, named Richo + Jones. The episode on 22 April 2014 was the twentieth-most-watched show on subscription television, reaching 39,000 viewers, and was the channel's second-most-highly rated broadcast that day. An episode on 17 June, featuring a live interview with Clive Palmer, was the seventeenth-most-watched show on subscription television and the most watched broadcast on Sky News with 43,000 viewers. The program was then retitled Jones & Co and co-hosted by Peta Credlin. In November 2021, Jones's contract with Sky News was not renewed. This means that for the first time in Jones's media career he has not had a media platform.

In December 2021 Jones began co-hosting a political discussion program on the free, digital platform, ADH TV,

=== Stage ===
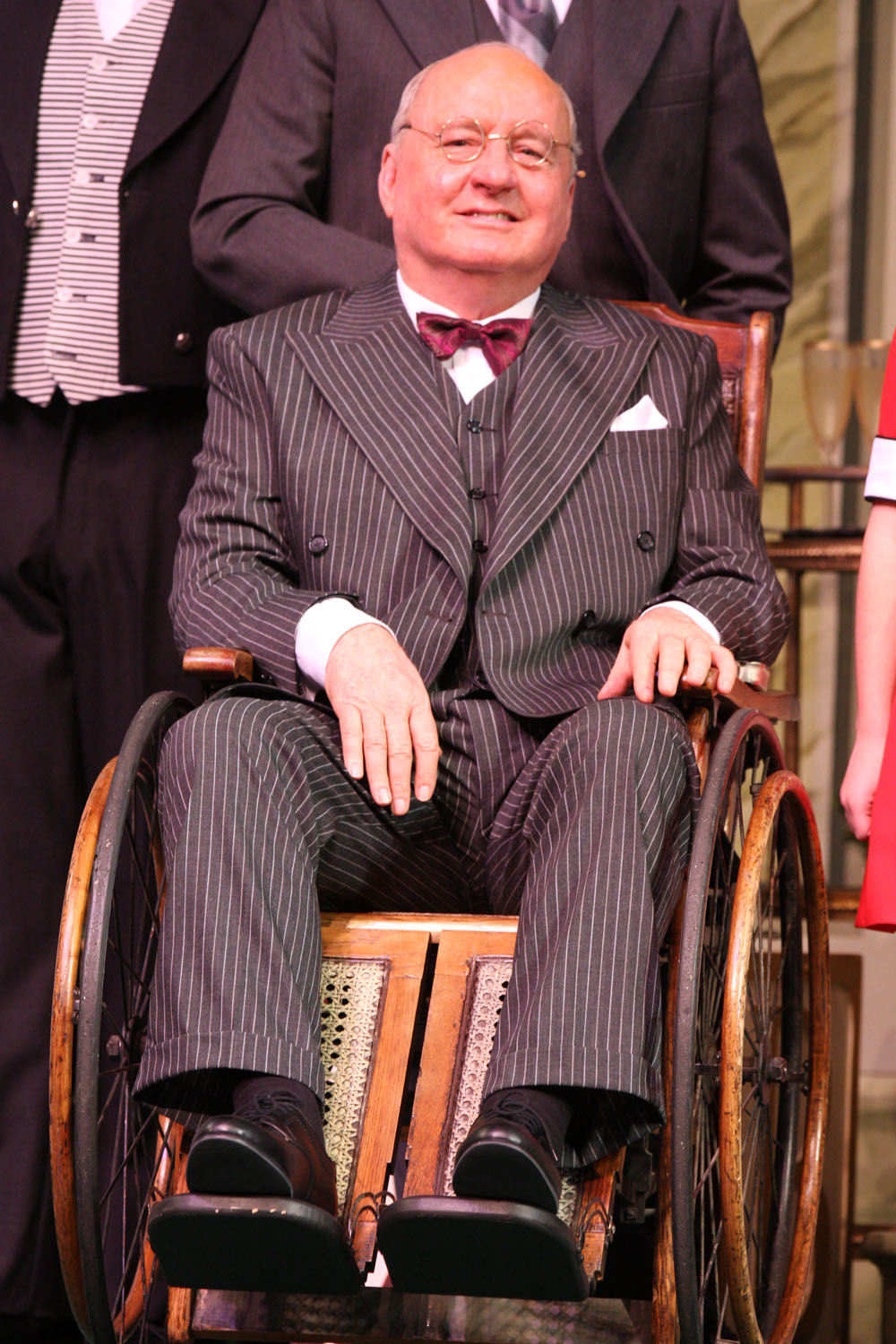
Jones as Franklin Delano Roosevelt in the musical Annie

Jones had his stage musical debut in 2012, playing the role of Franklin Delano Roosevelt in the Lyric Theatre's production of Annie the Musical in Sydney.

== Charity work ==
Jones is noted for his support of charitable organisations and causes. As well as financial contributions, Jones has regularly made personal appearances and given talks to support organisations he backs. Jones is also well known for providing support to individuals, such as listeners who contact him through his radio show, and for giving personal, professional, and financial assistance to friends and acquaintances, especially young elite sportspeople.

In 2004 Jones received a Queen's Birthday Honour of an Officer of the Order of Australia (AO) for his service to the media and sports' administration, and for helping many charities. These organisations included Youth Off The Streets, the Children's Hospital, Starlight Children's Foundation, the Sir Edward Dunlop Medical Research Foundation and the Heart Research Institute.

== Views and comments ==
Jones has been a participant in national debates for some decades. A former candidate for Liberal Party preselection and former adviser to Liberal prime minister Malcolm Fraser, Jones is a noted supporter of conservative politics in Australia. He has nonetheless criticised or joined forces with Australian politicians from across the party-political spectrum to lobby for political causes.

Jones says he does not believe in significant human-induced climate change and has been critical of government policy to use the Australian taxation system as a means of reducing carbon emissions. His radio show often promoted climate change denial, including claims that increases in carbon dioxide are natural and that there is significant scientific disagreement on the IPCC's findings. Jones is a supporter of the Galileo Movement, a climate change denial group which argues that climate change is a hoax perpetrated to form a world government. After the 2010 Australian Federal Election, Jones was critical of Prime Minister Julia Gillard's decision to introduce a price on carbon claiming that this was breaking a pre-election promise. In 2012, the Australian Communications and Media Authority censured Jones for broadcasting falsities about anthropological carbon dioxide, ordering him to undergo factual accuracy training and employ a fact-checker.

Jones, a Sydney-based broadcaster, has criticised Sydney Lord Mayor Clover Moore's efforts to close lane ways and parking areas in the city of Sydney to cars. Jones says that this unduly inconveniences long-distance commuters and adversely affects city-based businesses. On 29 June 2011 Jones said of the Lord Mayor of Sydney "put her in the same chaff bag as Julia Gillard and throw them both out to sea" and about Greens leader Bob Brown "The woman's [Gillard] off her tree and quite frankly they should shove her and Bob Brown in a chaff bag and take them as far out to sea as they can and tell them to swim home." In February 2011 Jones asked Gillard on air how she felt about being called "Ju-liar" and that people "are saying that we've got a liar running the country" following the reversal of her pre-election pledge not to introduce a new carbon tax. He also criticised her for being 10 minutes late for his program. These comments attracted condemnation from critics, including ABC Television's Jonathan Holmes of Media Watch.

Jones has called for consideration of expanding Australia's irrigation and dam systems. He opposed the Iemma Labor Government's plan to privatise the Snowy Mountains Scheme in 2006, and in 2011, he broadcast from Mildura from where he criticised the Gillard government's Murray-Darling Basin Plan, saying "we're seeing policy made without any consultation with people who are the stakeholders – the farmers".

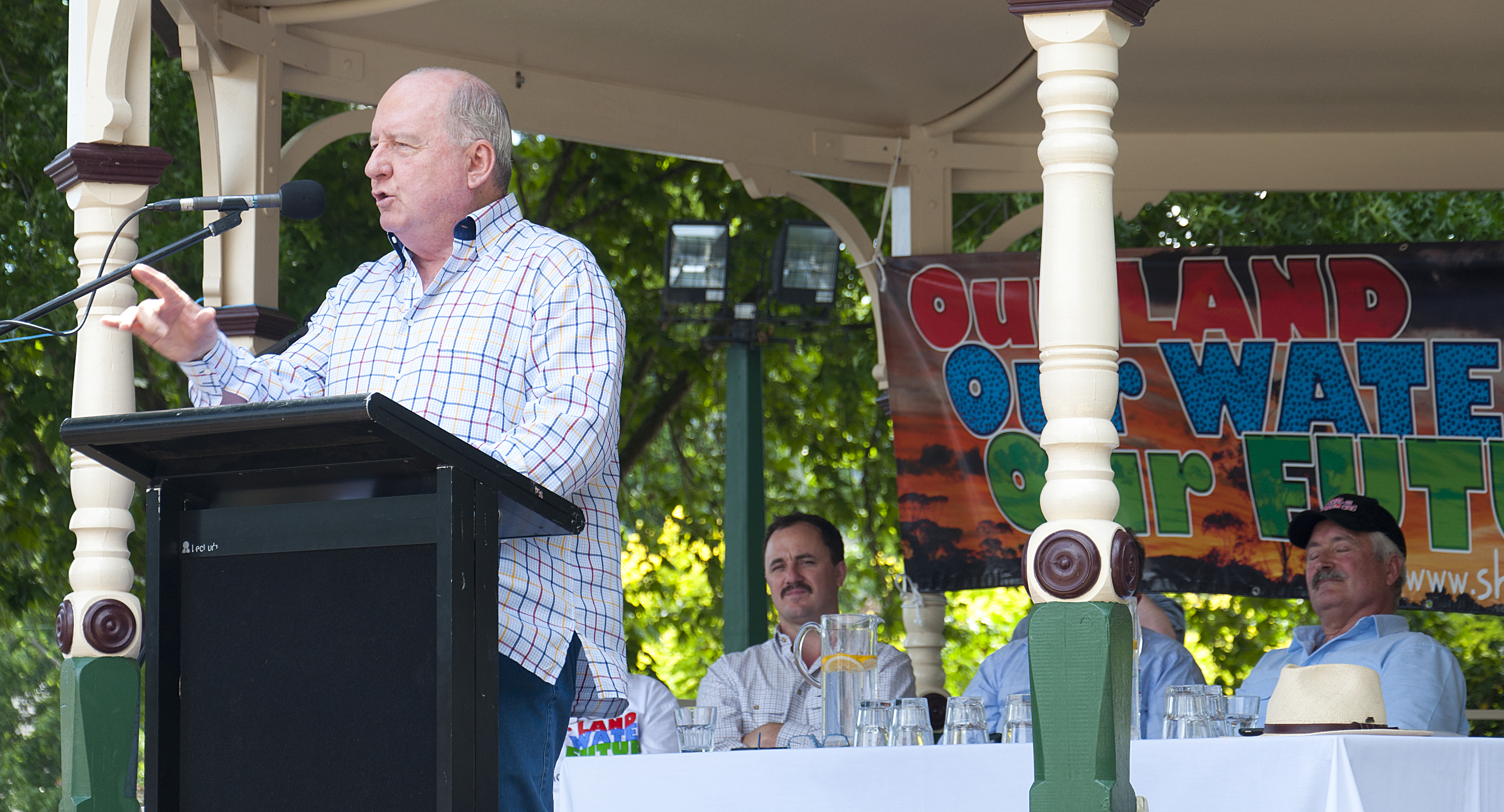
Jones addressing a coal seam gas protest meeting in Bowral on 19 November 2011

Jones has been a campaigner against coal seam gas mining in prime agricultural regions in Australia. Jones said on ABC Television that "no-one can be serious when they talk about food security and the great opportunities for us in Asia when our prime agricultural land is being surrendered to mining." In October 2011, Jones addressed the National Press Club on the issue.

In August 2019,Jones was criticised for his remark that Prime Minister Scott Morrison should "shove a sock down [the] throat" of his New Zealand counterpart Jacinda Ardern following her criticism at the 2019 Pacific Islands Forum conference in Tuvalu of the Australian Government's inaction on climate change. Jones later derided Ardern as a lightweight prime minister and a hypocrite. Jones's remarks were widely criticised by several quarters including former Australian Prime Minister Malcolm Turnbull and his successor Morrison. At least five companies cancelled advertising with Jones's 2GB radio show following complaints from customers. Jones later sent an apology letter to Prime Minister Ardern, apologizing for "not choosing his words carefully."

Jones is a critic of foreign ownership in Australia, especially by China.

=== "Died of shame" controversy ===
In a September 2012 speech at a Sydney University Liberal Club social function, Jones stated that Prime Minister Julia Gillard was a liar and, as a consequence, her father had recently "died of shame". The remarks relating to Gillard's father were condemned from all sides of the political spectrum by politicians, media and social media outlets. Jones held a press conference and said he "got it wrong", and wanted to apologise to Gillard both publicly and in person. Julia Gillard refused to receive a call from Jones for an apology. Both the prime minister's Labor colleagues and Liberal figures including Opposition leader Tony Abbott criticised Jones for his remarks. There have been suggestions from the media that this was part of what led to Julia Gillard's so-called "Misogyny Speech"

Labor Party figures sought to associate Tony Abbott and the Liberal Party with Jones's remarks, leading to counteraccusations that they were seeking to "gain political capital" from the affair. Many sponsors pulled advertising from Jones's show, followed by lobbying campaigned through social media to have the remaining advertisers boycott the program. On 7 October Jones's employer, the Macquarie Radio Network, announced that it would suspend all advertising on the Alan Jones show on 2GB to protect its advertisers from pressure being applied through social media activism. Jones called the campaign "cyber bullying". More than 80 sponsors boycotted Jones's program, including Telstra, Woolworths, Toyota, Mercedes-Benz and Coles. Macquarie Radio estimated the boycott cost the station between $1 million and $1.5 million, and some advertisers said they will never return.

=== COVID-19 ===
During March 2020, while Australia reacted to exponentially increasing infections from the COVID-19 pandemic, Jones played down the risk, saying "We now seem to be facing the health version of global warming. Exaggeration in almost everything. Certainly in description, and certainly in behaviour." In statements playing down the risk of the global COVID-19 pandemic, Jones concentrated on static numbers of infections and death, omitting mention of the universally-agreed exponential increase in those numbers that is behind medical professionals' concerns about the disease. At the time, Jones was in isolation at his country estate to avoid risk of infection. Jones's radio audience consists largely of older people who are in the most severe risk group for the disease. Commentator Mike Carlton labelled Jones's COVID-19 comments as "dangerous" and "reckless".

Jones backed down soon afterwards, agreeing that for "those at greater risk, older Australians and those who are more vulnerable, particularly those with pre-existing conditions ... it is a far more serious virus", but still failed to mention the exponential increase in infection and death. Jones said that "China brought this disaster on" and raised rumours without evidence of China buying devalued Australian assets.

== Court actions and tribunal findings ==
Throughout his time as a radio personality Jones has been the subject of a number of court and tribunal investigations.

=== Defamation cases ===
Jones has been involved in numerous defamation cases arising from his comments on radio. These have included:

- 1990: Jones in his role with 2UE was ordered by a court to pay over $55,000 damages for defaming David Parker, a former councillor of the NRMA, the NSW Motorists' organisation; 2UE was also ordered to pay $80,000. Parker was defamed during the NRMA election campaign in October 1986.
- 1994: Jones and 2UE were sued in November by Don Mackay, president of the NRMA, alleging that Jones made a false imputations against him.
- 1998: Jones claimed on-air that rugby league referee Bill Harrigan was biased. Harrigan sued Jones for defamation and, in 2001, was awarded damages of $90,000.
- 2002: Jones and 2UE settled out of court a defamation claim by Detective Chief Inspector Deborah Wallace, a NSW police officer. Jones defamed Wallace during five broadcasts in 2001.
- 2008: Jones was found to have defamed Australian Olympic Committee chief John Coates with comments regarding Coates's handling of an incident involving rower Sally Robbins' performance at the 2004 Olympics.
- 2011: Jones was sued in December by health bureaucrat Terry Clout over comments made by Jones in March 2009.
- 2015: Jones was sued in January by former Queensland Premier Campbell Newman and deputy Jeff Seeney over comments made by Jones alleging Mr Newman of lying to him and the public about expanding the Acland coal mine in southern Queensland.
- 2018: Jones was successfully sued by members of the Wagner family after he accused them of being responsible for the deaths of 12 people during the 2010–11 Queensland floods following the collapse of a wall in a quarry they owned. Jones and the radio stations that broadcast him were ordered to pay $3.7 million in damages to the Wagner family.
- 2018: Jones was sued by Jeff Parnell, a NSW government acoustic scientist, who was accused by Jones of altering an independent noise-monitoring report for a wind farm.

Others involved in defamation proceedings with Jones have included Aboriginal woman Mary-Lou Buck, Lola Scott (previously the highest-ranking female NSW police officer), Rockdale mayor Shaoquett Moselmane, Aboriginal leader Pat Dodson, the rugby league judiciary, liquidator Ian Ferrier and his twelve partners, Racing NSW's chief steward Ray Murrihy, rugby union chief John O'Neill (about $50,000), former Herald letters editor Geraldine Walsh (about $100,000) and QC Bob Stitt (about $50,000).

=== London incident ===
On 6 December 1988 Jones was arrested in an underground public toilet on Broadwick Street in the Soho area of London. He was taken to the Mayfair police station and charged with 'outraging public decency' and 'committing an indecent act'. Jones's friends rushed to his support, and when the case was heard in the Marlborough Street Magistrates' Court the next day the Crown withdrew the more serious charge, with Jones pleading not guilty to the lesser charge of committing an indecent act. The authorities ultimately did not present any evidence to support either charge, and the second charge was also later dropped, with Jones's lawyers winning £70 in costs. Jones read a prepared statement when he first appeared back on his radio show on 16 January 1989, saying "I am and always was innocent of the charges levelled against me". Jones has avoided talking about the incident ever since, although it is frequently raised by his opponents or those looking to highlight alleged hypocrisy in his comments.

=== Early contempt of court charges ===
In 1992 Jones was rebuked by the New South Wales Independent Commission Against Corruption for attacking former State Minister Dr Terry Metherell during evidence in an inquiry relating to Metherell's appointment to a government job.

Also in 1992 Jones and radio station 2UE were found guilty of contempt of court after the trial of former police officer John Killen was aborted following Jones's interview with a former Drug Enforcement Squad officer. Killen was facing a charge of conspiracy to pervert the course of justice when Jones conducted the interview and alleged that police had suffered from false accusations. The station was fined $77,000 and Jones $2,000.

=== Cash for comment affair ===
In July 1994 Media Watch highlighted Jones's on-air promotion of Optus.

Between 1999 and 2000,the Cash for comment investigation was conducted. Jones had been accused of contracting to have personal commercial support in exchange for favourable "unscripted" comments, principally for Telstra and Qantas, during his radio show. The independent Australian Broadcasting Corporation TV show, Media Watch, was heavily involved in exposing these practices. The Australian Broadcasting Authority finally decided that disclosure had to be made, hence the "Commercial Agreement Register" at the Jones portion of his station's website. (Jones was investigated along with John Laws from 2UE).

In April 2004 another scandal broke after it was revealed the chair of the Australian Broadcasting Authority, David Flint, who had headed the cash for comment inquiries, had sent a stream of admiring letters to Jones. This called into question the impartiality of Flint, and the then Federal Minister for Communications, Daryl Williams, was embroiled in media speculation as to the future of Flint. With an inquiry imminent, Flint resigned. In an appearance on the ABC's Enough Rope, John Laws accused Jones of placing pressure on Prime Minister John Howard to keep Flint as head of the ABA, made comments that many viewers took to imply a sexual relationship between Jones and Flint and broadly hinted that Jones was homosexual like Flint, who is openly gay.

=== Cronulla riots ===
In December 2005, in the lead-up to the Cronulla riots, Jones used his breakfast radio program to read out and discuss a widely circulated text message that called on people to "Come to Cronulla this weekend to take revenge ... get down to North Cronulla to support the Leb and wog bashing day". Media commentator David Marr accused Jones of inciting racial tensions and implicitly encouraging violence and vigilantism by the manner of his responses to callers even while he was verbally disapproving of them taking the law into their own hands.

On 10 April 2007 the Australian broadcasting watchdog the Australian Communications and Media Authority (ACMA) found that the broadcaster 2GB and Jones had broadcast material (specifically comments made by Jones between 5 and 9 December 2005) that was "likely to encourage violence or brutality and to vilify people of Lebanese and Middle-Eastern backgrounds on the basis of ethnicity". During his on-air rebuttal of the ACMA findings on 10 April 2007, Jones stated that by referring to his show as "Breakfast with Alan Jones", the Australian Communications and Media Authority had little credibility, as his show was actually known as "The Alan Jones Show". However, the 2GB website prior to this broadcast clearly showed the Jones program as being "Breakfast with Alan Jones"; this was changed after the broadcast of Jones's rebuttal to be "The Alan Jones Show".

David Flint again defended Jones by appearing on Jones's morning show "to support his friend and to condemn the process that found him guilty. He told 2GB listeners that the vigilante movement existed at Cronulla long before Jones began broadcasting and that the ACMA findings amounted to a classic case of shoot the messenger. He said the complaints process was flawed because, unlike the Press Council, Jones could not face or question his accusers".

The NSW Administrative Decisions Tribunal upheld a complaint of racial vilification against Jones and 2GB in December 2009. Jones appealed the decision, but in October 2012 the NSW Administrative Decisions Tribunal dismissed his appeal, and upheld his conviction for inciting hatred and for vilification of Muslims.

Jones apologised on-air for his remarks on 6 December 2012. But on 12 December the Tribunal ruled that this apology was "an inadequate statement of wrongdoing" and ordered him to make another on-air apology during the week of 17 December, this time prescribing the words he was to read:

On 28 April 2005, on my breakfast program on Radio 2GB, I broadcast comments about Lebanese males, including Lebanese Muslims. The comments were made following a Channel Nine television current affairs show about the conduct of young Lebanese men in Hickson Road at The Rocks. The Administrative Decisions Tribunal has found that my comments incited serious contempt of Lebanese males, including Lebanese Muslims. Those comments were in breach of the New South Wales Anti-Discrimination Act. I apologise for making those comments, which I recognise were unlawful. I also apologise on behalf of Radio 2GB.

=== Contempt of court charges ===
In 2007, Jones was found guilty of breaching the Children's (Criminal Proceedings) Act 1987 (NSW), by broadcasting the suppressed name of a juvenile witness in a murder trial. The deputy chief magistrate, Helen Syme, criticised Jones for not issuing an on-air apology to the boy he had named, and said that Jones's offence was "serious". The magistrate placed Jones on a nine-month good-behaviour bond and fined him $1000.

In February 2008 Jones lost an appeal against his conviction, but Jones's criminal conviction was quashed the following month. The judge presiding over the appeal, Judge Michael Finnane, said: "While it was no excuse from liability in law that Mr Jones relied on The Daily Telegraph, the fact that he did, to some extent ameliorates the seriousness of the offence." The judge confirmed Jones's guilt but dismissed the charge and annulled the conviction, saying it was "an honest mistake".

=== Kovco comments ===
In October 2007 NSW State Coroner Mary Jerram considered referring Jones and The Daily Telegraph to the NSW Supreme Court for comments about the inquest into the death of Private Jake Kovco. Jones said that assisting counsel John Agius had tried to persuade Kovco's mother into refusing a jury inquest, comments which Jerram said could prejudice the inquest. No charges were brought against Jones.

=== Military trial commentary ===
An episode of ABC's Media Watch was devoted to Jones's pre-trial comments on the charging of three Australian soldiers serving in Afghanistan. The commentators believed that if the case had already been convened, Jones's comments would have been in contempt of court. The charges against the soldiers were eventually dismissed at a pre-trial hearing.

=== Breach of radio standards ===
On 25 November 2011 the Australian Communications and Media Authority found that Jones had breached the commercial radio code of practice in his reporting of environmental issues. His reporting was found to lack accuracy and failed to allow other viewpoints to be heard. A decision on the penalty for this breach was reserved.

=== Climate change commentary ===
On 15 June 2012 the Australian Communications and Media Authority found that Jones had breached the commercial radio code of practice in his reporting of environmental issues. This related to his claim that "human beings produce 0.001 per cent of carbon dioxide in the atmosphere". ACMA chairman Chris Chapman said that the watchdog was not penalising the licensee of 2GB, but was working with it to improve procedures. On 18 October 2012 ACMA ordered Jones to undergo factual accuracy training and employ a fact-checker.

Jones responded to these claims on 19 October 2012, claiming that he had mistakenly claimed the 0.001 to be of all "carbon dioxide in the atmosphere" where it should have been "all gases in the atmosphere" and that he had repeated the correct and undisputed figure of 3 percent numerous times later that week and offered a correction.

=== COVID-19 lockdown comments ===
Jones was a critic of former Victorian Premier Daniel Andrews and his Labor government. During August 2020, Jones broadcast an editorial on his Sky News show in which he opposed restrictions over COVID-19 within Victoria, claiming the science did not support stronger regulations. An investigation by the Australian Communications and Media Authority found Jones correctly quoted the science journal, but "misrepresented the research on the effectiveness of lockdowns" and wearing masks to restrict the spread of the virus. The Australian Communications and Media Authority made Jones issue a correction in January 2021.

== Sexual assault allegations and arrest ==
In December 2023 a number of men accused Jones of indecent assault in an investigative report by Kate McClymont published by The Sydney Morning Herald and The Age; Jones "vehemently denied" the allegations. In March 2024 NSW Police's Child Abuse Squad established Strike Force Bonnefin to investigate the alleged incidents, which took place between 2001 and 2019.

On the morning of 18 November 2024 Jones was arrested at his Circular Quay residence by strike force detectives. He was initially charged with 24 offences against eight complainants over two decades, including 11 counts of aggravated indecent assault – victim under authority of offender, nine counts of assault with an act of indecency, two counts of sexually touching another person without consent and two counts of common assault. The youngest alleged victim was 17 years old at the time of the alleged offending. Some complainants knew Jones personally, some knew him professionally, and others had only recently met him. The aggravated indecent assault charges related to a former employee.

Jones was granted conditional bail, with restrictions on his travel and on contacting the alleged victims. On 19 November 2024 he was charged with two further counts of assault with an act of indecency relating to a ninth alleged victim. Before appearing in court on 18 December 2024, Jones was charged with a further eight counts of indecent assault relating to a tenth alleged victim, bringing the total to 34 charges. Jones pleaded not guilty. In a prepared statement following his first court appearance, he described the allegations as "baseless ... or [distortions of] the truth", stating: "I am certainly not guilty".

In the wake of his arrest, several public figures commented on the allegations. Peta Credlin alleged Jones had been treated unfairly, Andrew Bolt described the case as potentially "one of the greatest falls from grace we have seen", and James Packer said that Jones was entitled to the presumption of innocence. Former producer Josh Szeps also alleged that Jones had made unwanted sexual advances towards him, but defended Jones's character and described the conduct as "playful" and "excessively romantic".

On 7 March 2025 Jones was charged with an additional count of assault with an act of indecency relating to an 11th complainant, taking the total number of charges to 35 offences. On 16 September 2025 he was charged with a further nine counts of indecent assault, increasing the total to 44 offences. Later that month several aggravated indecent assault charges were replaced with lesser charges and the number of complainants was reduced from 11 to nine, reducing the total number of charges to 27. In June 2026, one charge of assault with an act of indecency was withdrawn, reducing the number of complainants to eight, and in July a further four indecent assault charges were withdrawn.

Jones's judge-alone trial commenced in the Local Court of New South Wales on 3 August 2026 before Judge Glenn Walsh. Jones pleaded not guilty to 22 charges of indecent assault and sexual touching relating to six complainants. The prosecution alleges the offences occurred between 2003 and 2019. More than 70 witnesses are expected to give evidence during the trial. Jones denies the allegations and is contesting all charges. Responding to text messages presented in court, Jones admits to texting men in a “flirty” way, but denies indecently assaulting the complainants.

== Personal life ==
Jones has never been married and has no children. He resides in Sydney. In 2003 Jones purchased a 27-hectare property in Fitzroy Falls for $2.3 million, which he sold in 2022. In 2017, Jones purchased an apartment in Circular Quay for $10.5 million. In 2021 he bought a riverfront house in Southport, Queensland, for $12.25 million.

=== Health issues ===
In July 2008 Jones underwent surgery for prostate cancer. In December 2008, he had surgery to remove a benign brain tumour. Jones had back surgery and neck operations in November 2016 which caused him to be off-air for four months. In November 2018 he was hospitalised for severe back pain and again was off air. He underwent back surgery again in November 2022.

== Jonestown ==
Jonestown: The Power and the Myth of Alan Jones (Allen & Unwin) is an unauthorised biography of Jones by Australian journalist Chris Masters. Masters began Jonestown in 2002 after profiling Jones for an episode of the current affairs program Four Corners. Originally slated for publication by ABC Enterprises, it was controversially dropped, citing fears of financial losses. Among other details of Jones's career, it reported on his term as Senior English Master at The King's School, Parramatta, and an incident in London in 1988 where he was arrested and charged for outraging public decency in London's public toilets, charges that were ultimately dropped.

The book won the Australian Book Industry Awards' Australian Biography of the Year 2007.

== Home media ==
In 2015 Umbrella Entertainment issued a two-disc DVD collection of interviews by Jones with notable Australians. Titled Great Australians with Alan Jones, subjects are: Richard Bonynge, Raelene Boyle, Ita Buttrose, Ian Frazer, Nancye Hayes, John Howard, Sydney Kirkby, Harry Messel, Matt Mitcham, John Olsen, Ken Rosewall, John Singleton, Anthony Warlow, and Carla Zampatti. Michael Tear was producer; Serge Ou director; and Michael Cove was credited as writer for the series.

Sporting positions
Preceded by Bob Dwyer; 1982–1984	Coach Australia; 1984–1987	Succeeded by Bob Dwyer; 1988–1996
Preceded by Bob Lane	Coach; Manly Marlins; 1983	Succeeded by Bob Morris
