= Deborah Richards =

Australian journalist

Deborah Richards is an Australian journalist, of English descent from the Edwards family. Richards has worked for the Australian Broadcasting Corporation, Essential Viewing Group, and Special Broadcasting Service.

== Life ==
Richards attended Brighton Beach Primary School in Melbourne, Australia, and then the Firbank Girls' Grammar School from Year 7, but transferred to Morongo Girls' College (now Kardinia International College) for the last term of Year 10 until graduation. She then enrolled at Monash University in 1972, taking an Arts degree, with a double major in Sociology and English. Richards deferred her English Honours year in 1976, and concentrated her efforts into building a mudbrick house in the Macclesfield area, located in the Dandenong Hills region, above Melbourne.

== Career ==
Richards career began at the ABC, in 1983, when she was selected for the television producer training course. Two years later, Richards moved to New South Wales to work at Four Corners. Her career there lasted nine years; two years was spent as a reporter, another two as an associate producer, and five as a field producer. Richards was responsible for the "re-vamping" of Lateline (an ABC program), and the Business Show (an SBS program). She was the executive producer of MediaWatch, and has produced several Australian Stories, and a documentary on lymphoma for the Leukemia Foundation of Australia.

Richards presented Earth Beat, and environmental program on Radio National for a short period of time. Richards left the program to have her first and only child.

In 2003, Richards, her husband, and daughter moved to the Southern Highlands of New South Wales. Since then, Richards has worked as a freelance journalist for the Sydney Morning Herald, the Australian Doctor, the Medical Observer, and the Australian Financial Review. She now works as the co-editor of a local, independent news magazine called "YourTimes", and also as the producer for the Intelligence Squared Australia Debates (also known as iq2oz).

== Awards ==
She was jointly awarded a Golden Walkley Award in 1999, alongside Anne Connelly and Richard Ackland for their Cash For Comment affair exposé on MediaWatch. In 2003, Richards was listed as Health Journalist of the Year, presented by the National Press Club of Australia for a feature article about end-of-life decisions, which was presented in the Australian Doctor magazine.
