= Australian Broadcasting Authority =

Government agency regulating broadcasting and telecommunications

Agency overview
- Formed: 5 October 1992
- Preceding agency: Australian Broadcasting Tribunal
- Dissolved: 1 July 2005
- Superseding agency: Australian Communications and Media Authority
- Jurisdiction: Government of Australia
- Minister responsible: Minister for Communications

The Australian Broadcasting Authority was an Australian government agency whose main roles were to regulate broadcasting, radio communications and telecommunications. The Authority took over the functions of the Australian Broadcasting Tribunal on 5 October 1992 as stipulated in the Broadcasting Services Act 1992.

The Australian Broadcasting Tribunal took over the functions of the Australian Broadcasting Control Board in the 1970s. The engineering function in some cases was handled by the National Transmission Agency when the Postmaster-General's Department ceased being responsible for telecommunications.

On 1 July 2005, the Australian Broadcasting Authority and the Australian Communications Authority were merged to form the Australian Communications and Media Authority.

== See also ==
- Censorship in Australia
