= George Megalogenis =

Australian author and journalist (born 1964)

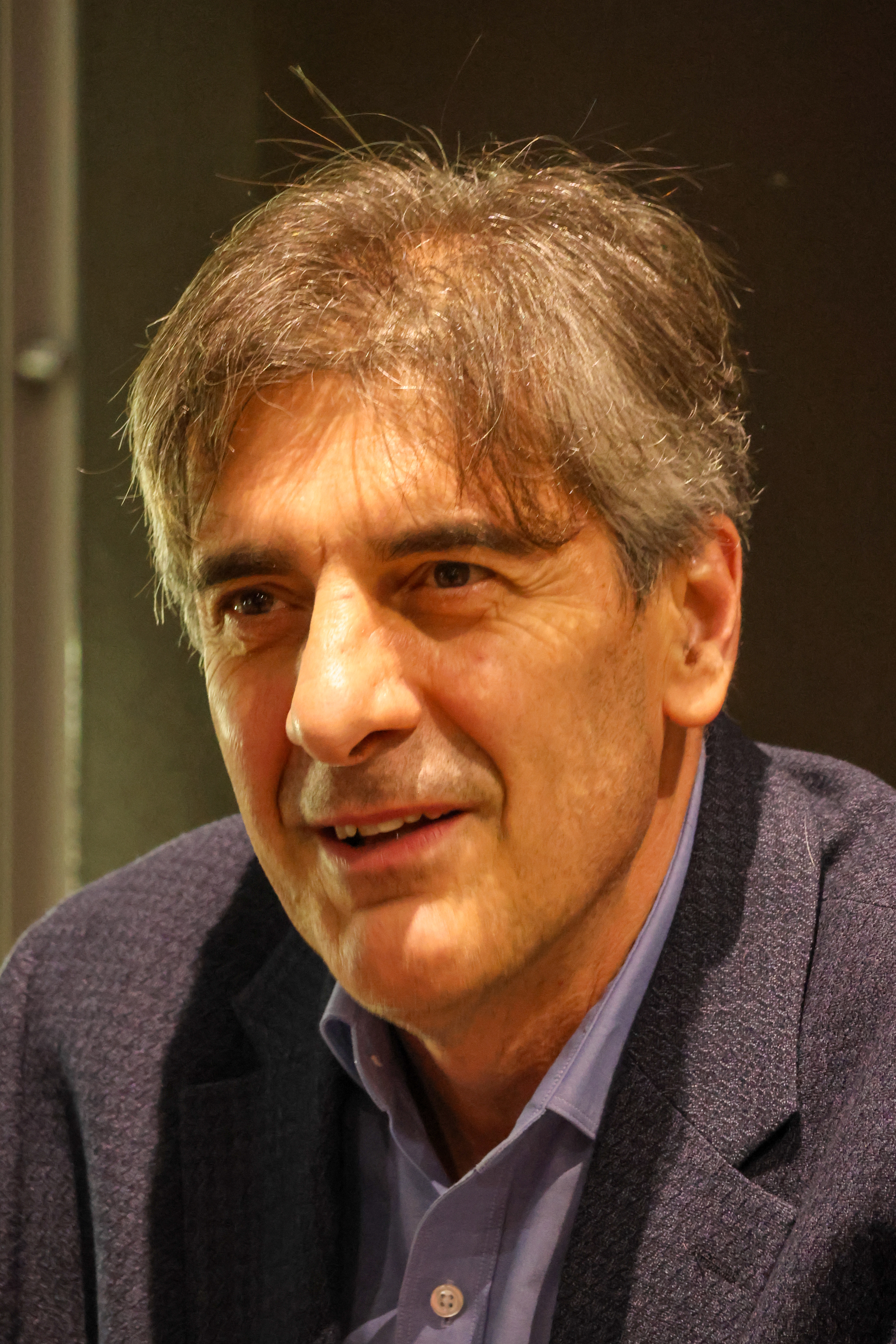
- Megalogenis in 2026
- Born: 1964 (age 61–62)
- Education: University of Melbourne (BComm)
- Occupations: Author; journalist; political commentator
- Notable work: Faultlines and The Australian Moment
- Spouse: Annastacia Palaszczuk (m. 1996; div. 1998)

George Megalogenis (born 1964) is an Australian journalist, political commentator and author.

== Early life ==
Born in Melbourne, Megalogenis attended Melbourne High School and went on to study economics at the University of Melbourne (BCom 1984).

== Career ==
In 1986, Megalogenis joined The Sun News-Pictorial as a cadet journalist, before working as an economics correspondent for News Limited morning newspapers from 1988 to 1990.

He then moved to The Australian newspaper in 1991, where he became a senior feature writer. After eleven years in the Canberra Press Gallery, from 1988 to 1999, he returned to Melbourne, and since 2012 he has primarily focused on book writing and documentary making. His work examines the political, economic and social history of Australia.

During a 2017 interview, Megalogenis said to the ABC that Australia must embrace a Eurasian future.

== Personal life ==
From 1996 to 1998, Megalogenis was married to Annastacia Palaszczuk, Premier of Queensland 2015 to 2023.

== Written work ==
- Faultlines: Race, Work, and the Politics of Changing Australia (2003) – An in-depth review of the shifting demographics, the political handling of race-related issues, and the work-family challenges that have contributed to the changing face of Australia.
- The Longest Decade (2006) – A look at how the 1990s in Australia was a political era defined by two men, Paul Keating and John Howard, who altered Australia's predictable economic script of bust, boom, and bust. As treasurers and prime ministers, Keating and Howard dominated 30 years of power in Australia. By many, they are viewed as antagonists with competing visions of Australia and its place in the world. Megalogenis argues they should also be remembered as the architects of a political, social and economic revolution that led to a more complex society and an era of unprecedented affluence.
- "Trivial Pursuit: Leadership and the End of the Reform Era" (2010) – In this contribution to Quarterly Essay, Megalogenis argues that Australia's Bob Hawke, Paul Keating and early John Howard years were ones of bold reform; and that more recently Australia has seen an era of power without purpose. He dissects the cycle of polls, focus groups and presidential politics and what these have done to the prospect of serious, difficult reform. He argues that politics has become a self-defeating game, and he mounts a case for a different style of leadership.
- The Australian Moment (2012) – The book takes in the key events since the 1970s that led to unprecedented economic stability in Australia despite periods of turmoil on world markets. Megalogenis reasons that the resilience of Australian markets to weather recent economic storms leaves the country as well positioned as any to survive whatever comes next. It received praise from journalists such as Annabel Crabb and David Marr, and Australian author Don Watson described the book as "likely to become the essential short work on modern Australia." The book won the 2012 Walkley Book Award, the 2013 Prime Minister's Literary Award for non-fiction, and was Australia's bestselling political book of 2012. The book was updated with a new afterword and appendix in 2015.
- Australia's Second Chance (2015) – Megalogenis argues that while most nations do not get a first chance to prosper, Australia is on its second. He examines how Australia, one of the world's richest countries through the nineteenth century, moved from being a booming pioneer for democracy and a magnet for migrants to a subsequent fifty-year bust. And now that Australia is back on top, in the position where history suggests its biggest mistakes have been made, he asks: can Australia's leaders learn from the past and cement its place as one of the world's great nations?
- “The Football Solution – How Richmond’s premiership can save Australia” (2019).
- Minority Report, The New Shape of Australian Politics (November 2024) — Quarterly Essay
- Three Shocks: Who we are becoming in the 21st Century (2026) – Megalogenis maps three key changes in Australia's population, workforce and geopolitical standing: for the first time since Federation, Australia’s population is mostly made up of migrants and their children; professional women have now replaced men doing blue collar jobs as the largest segment of the workforce; and on the world scale, Australia can no longer rely on traditional allies (the US) or trading partners (China).

== Television ==
Megalogenis was a regular guest on the ABC's political analysis and panel discussion program Insiders and appeared on Q+A.

In 2014, he wrote and presented a documentary series for the ABC: Making Australia Great: Inside Our Longest Boom, which aired in March 2015. In 2015, he wrote and presented a documentary tribute to former Australian prime minister Malcolm Fraser titled Life Wasn't Meant to Be Easy.

== Awards and nominations ==
- 2003 – Melbourne Press Club Quill award for Best Columnist
- 2012 – Queensland Literary Award, Advancing Public Debate for The Australian Moment
- 2012 – Walkley Award, Non-Fiction Book for The Australian Moment
- 2012 – Shortlisted for the John Button Prize, Writing on Policy & Politics for The Australian Moment
- 2013 – Prime Minister's Literary Award, Non-Fiction for The Australian Moment
- 2014 – Shortlisted for the Adelaide Festival Award for Literature for The Australian Moment
