= See What You Made Me Do =

2019 book by Jess Hill

- Author: Jess Hill
- Genre: Non-fiction
- Publisher: Black Inc
- Publication date: 6/2019
- Publication place: Australia
- Pages: 416
- Awards: 2020 Stella Prize
- ISBN: 9781760641405

See What You Made Me Do is a 2019 non-fiction book by Australian investigative journalist Jess Hill about domestic violence in Australia. The book was published by Black Inc and was the winner of the 2020 Stella Prize. The book was adapted into a three-part documentary series that aired on SBS in 2021.

== Publication history ==
The book was first published in Australia in June 2019 by Black Inc. Adapted versions of the book were published in the United Kingdom by Hurst Publishers in October 2020 and in the United States by Sourcebooks in September 2020.

== Reception ==
The book received generally positive reviews. In a review for the Sydney Review of Books, Alecia Simmonds called the book "comprehensive, well-researched and exquisitely written". Writing in Westerly magazine, Jen Bowden called the book "a vital, thought-provoking and harrowing look at one of the biggest emergencies facing not just Australia, but the whole world". In Australian Book Review, Zora Simic called the book a "thorough, thoughtful, solutions-oriented examination that demands to be taken seriously". The book also received positive reviews in The Conversation and Readings Monthly.

The heavily adapted US edition of the book received a more mixed review in Kirkus Reviews, which suggested that Hill's analysis of domestic violence in the United States was less convincing than her portrayal of other countries. But the US edition was more positively reviewed in Publishers Weekly, which wrote that the book was a "nuanced and eye-opening study of a hidden crisis".

== Awards ==
Awards for See What You Made Me Do
Year	Award	Result	Ref.
2019	Walkley Book Award	Finalist	
2019	Australian Human Rights Commission Media Award	Finalist	
2020	Stella Prize	Winner	
2020	ABIA General Non-Fiction Book of the Year	Shortlisted	
2020	Victorian Premier's Literary Awards	Shortlisted	
2020	Prime Minister’s Literary Award for Non-fiction	Shortlisted	
2020	Indie Book Awards	Longlisted	

== Documentary ==
The book was adapted into a three-part documentary series that aired on SBS in May 2021. The series received positive reviews, including in the Sydney Morning Herald, The Saturday Paper, The Guardian, and Crikey.
