= Quarterly Essay =

Australian quarterly magazine

- Managing Editor: Chris Feik
- Frequency: Quarterly
- Publisher: Schwartz Publishing
- First issue: 2001
- Company: Black Inc.
- Country: Australia
- Website: quarterlyessay.com.au
- ISSN: 1832-0953

Quarterly Essay, founded in 2001, is an Australian periodical published by Black Inc., concentrating primarily on Australian politics in a broad sense. Printed in a book-like page size and using a single-column format, each issue features a single extended essay of at least 20,000 words, with an introduction by the editor, and correspondence relating to essays in previous issues.

In early 2004 founding editor Peter Craven was sacked by the magazine's owner, property developer Morry Schwartz, over a dispute about the joint authorship of one essay, and, more widely, the magazine's future direction. Schwartz stated that while he had a vision of the magazine as more "political and Australian" whereas Craven was perhaps "more broad and internationalist".

== Editions ==
#	Author	Title	Published	Notes
1	Robert Manne	"In Denial: The Stolen Generations and the Right"	April 2001	
2	John Birmingham	"Appeasing Jakarta: Australia's complicity in the East Timor tragedy"	June 2001	
3	Guy Rundle	"The Opportunist: John Howard and the Triumph of Reaction"	October 2001	
4	Don Watson	"Rabbit syndrome: Australia and America"	December 2001	
5	Mungo MacCallum	"Girt by Sea: Australia, the Refugees and the Politics of Fear"	March 2002	
6	John Button	"Beyond belief: What future for Labor?"	August 2002	
7	John Martinkus	"Paradise Betrayed: West Papua's Struggle for Independence"	September 2002	
8	Amanda Lohrey	"Groundswell: The Rise of the Greens"	November 2002	
9	Tim Flannery	"Beautiful Lies: Population & Environment in Australia"	March 2003	Review by Sue Bond, API Network
10	Gideon Haigh	"Bad Company: The cult of the CEO"	June 2003	
11	Germaine Greer	"Whitefella Jump Up: The Shortest Way to Nationhood"	August 2003	Interview with ABC TV presenter Andrew Denton; Review by Mitchell Rolls, API Network
12	David Malouf	"Made in England: Australia's British Inheritance"	November 2003	
13	Robert Manne with David Corlett	"Sending Them Home: Refugees and the New Politics of Indifference."	December 2003	
14	Paul McGeough	"Mission Impossible: The Sheikhs, the US and the future of Iraq"	June 2004	
15	Margaret Simons	"Latham's World: The New Politics of the Outsiders"	September 2004	
16	Raimond Gaita	"Breach of Trust: Truth, Morality and Politics"	December 2004	Review – Quarterly Essay 16: Matilda by larrikin
17	John Hirst	"Kangaroo Court: Family Law in Australia"	March 2005	
18	Gail Bell	"The Worried Well: The Depression Epidemic and the Medicalisation of Our Sorrows"	June 2005	Interview with ABC presenter Eleanor Hall; Interview with ABC presenter Richard Aedy; Review by Patrick Cullen in The Program; Response by Gordon Parker, Black Dog Institute
19	Judith Brett	"Relaxed and Comfortable: The Liberal Party's Australia"	August 2005	
20	John Birmingham	"A Time for War: Australia as a Military Power"	December 2005	
21	Clive Hamilton	"What's Left? The Death of Social Democracy"	March 2006	
22	Amanda Lohrey	"Voting for Jesus: Christianity and Politics in Australia"	June 2006	
23	Inga Clendinnen	"The History Question: Who Owns The Past?"	September 2006	Interview with ABC presenter Phillip Adams; Interview with ABC presenter Paul Barclay
24	Robyn Davidson	"No Fixed Address: Nomads and the Fate of the Planet"	November 2006	Review by Arthur Lucas, University of East Anglia
25	Peter Hartcher	"Bipolar Nation: How To Win The 2007 Election"	March 2007	
26	David Marr	"His Master's Voice: The Corruption of Public Debate under Howard "	May 2007	Public debate, with ABC presenter Phillip Adams; Review – His Master's Voice
27	Ian Lowe	"Reaction Time: Climate Change and the Nuclear Option"	September 2007	
28	Judith Brett	"Exit Right: The Unravelling of John Howard"	December 2007	
29	Anne Manne	"Love and Money: The Family and the Free Market"	March 2008	
30	Paul Toohey	"Last Drinks: The Impact of the Northern Territory Intervention"	June 2008	
31	Tim Flannery	"Now or Never: A Sustainable Future for Australia?"	September 2008	
32	Kate Jennings	"American Revolution: The Fall of Wall Street and the Rise of Barack Obama"	November 2008	
33	Guy Pearse	"Quarry Vision: Coal, Climate Change and the End of the Resources Boom"	March 2009	
34	Annabel Crabb	"Stop At Nothing: The Life and Adventures of Malcolm Turnbull"	June 2009	
35	Noel Pearson	"Radical Hope: Education and Equality in Australia"	September 2009	
36	Mungo MacCallum	"Australian Story: Kevin Rudd and the Lucky Country"	November 2009	
37	Waleed Aly	"What's Right? The Future of Conservatism in Australia"	March 2010	
38	David Marr	Power Trip: The Political Journey of Kevin Rudd	June 2010	
39	Hugh White	"Power Shift: Australia's Future between Washington and Beijing"	August 2010	
40	George Megalogenis	"Trivial Pursuit: Leadership and the End of the Reform Era"	November 2010	
41	David Malouf	"The Happy Life: The Search for Contentment in the Modern World"	March 2011	
42	Judith Brett	"Fair Share: Country and City in Australia"	June 2011	
43	Robert Manne	"Bad News: Murdoch's Australian and the shaping of the nation"	September 2011	
44	Andrew Charlton	"Man-Made World: Choosing between progress and planet"	November 2011	
45	Anna Krien	"Us & Them: On the Importance of Animals"	March 2012	
46	Laura Tingle	"Great Expectations: Government, Entitlement and an Angry Nation"	June 2012	
47	David Marr	"Political Animal: The Making of Tony Abbott"	September 2012	
48	Tim Flannery	"After the Future: Australia's New Extinction Crisis"	November 2012	
49	Mark Latham	"Not Dead Yet: Labor's Post-Left Future"	March 2013	
50	Anna Goldsworthy	"Unfinished Business: Sex, Freedom and Misogyny"	June 2013	
51	David Marr	"The Prince: Faith, Abuse and George Pell"	September 2013	
52	Linda Jaivin	"Found in Translation: In Praise of a Plural World"	November 2013	
53	Paul Toohey	"That Sinking Feeling: Asylum Seekers and the Search for the Indonesian Solution"	March 2014	
54	Andrew Charlton	"Dragon's Tail: The Lucky Country After the China Boom"	June 2014	
55	Noel Pearson	"A Rightful Place: Race, Recognition and a More Complete Commonwealth"	September 2014	
56	Guy Rundle	"Clivosaurus: The Politics of Clive Palmer"	November 2014	
57	Karen Hitchcock	"Dear Life: On caring for the elderly"	March 2015	
58	David Kilcullen	"Blood Year: Terror and the Islamic State"	May 2015	
59	David Marr	"Faction Man: Bill Shorten's path to power"	September 2015	
60	Laura Tingle	"Political Amnesia: How We Forgot to Govern"	December 2015	
61	George Megalogenis	"Balancing Act: Australia Between Recession and Renewal"	February 2016	
62	James Brown	"Firing Line: Australia's Path to War"	June 2016	
63	Don Watson	"Enemy Within: American Politics in the Time of Trump"	September 2016	
64	Stan Grant	"The Australian Dream: Blood, History and Becoming"	November 2016	
65	David Marr	"The White Queen: One Nation and the Politics of Race"	March 2017	
66	Anna Krien	"The Long Goodbye: Coal, Coral and Australia's Climate Deadlock"	June 2017	
67	Benjamin Law	"Moral Panic 101: Equality, Acceptance and the Safe Schools Scandal"	September 2017	
68	Hugh White	"Without America: Australia in the New Asia"	November 2017	
69	Mark McKenna	"Moment of Truth: History and Australia's Future"	March 2018	
70	Richard Denniss	"Dead Right: How Neoliberalism Ate Itself and What Comes Next"	June 2018	
71	Laura Tingle	"Follow the Leader: Democracy and the Rise of the Strongman"	September 2018	
72	Sebastian Smee	"Net Loss: The Inner Life in the Digital Age"	November 2018	
73	Rebecca Huntley	"Australia Fair: Listening to the Nation"	March 2019	
74	Erik Jensen	"The Prosperity Gospel: How Scott Morrison Won and Bill Shorten Lost"	June 2019	
75	Annabel Crabb	"Men at Work: Australia's Parenthood Trap"	September 2019	
76	Peter Hartcher	"Red Flag: Waking Up to China's Challenge"	November 2019	
77	Margaret Simons	"Cry Me a River: The Tragedy of the Murray–Darling Basin"	March 2020	
78	Judith Brett	"The Coal Curse: Resources, Climate and Australia's Future"	June 2020	
79	Katharine Murphy	"The End of Certainty: Scott Morrison and Pandemic Politics"	September 2020	
80	Laura Tingle	"The High Road: What Australia Can Learn From New Zealand"	November 2020	
81	Alan Finkel	"Getting to Zero: Australia's Energy Transition"	March 2021	
82	George Megalogenis	"Exit Strategy: Politics After the Pandemic"	June 2021	
83	Lech Blaine	"Top Blokes: The Larrikin Myth, Class and Power"	September 2021	
84	Jess Hill	"The Reckoning: How #MeToo is Changing Australia"	November 2021	
85	Sarah Krasnostein	"Not Waving, Drowning: Mental Illness and Vulnerability in Australia"	March 2022	
86	Hugh White	"Sleepwalk to War: Australia’s Unthinking Alliance with America"	June 2022	
87	Waleed Aly and Scott Stephens	"Uncivil Wars: How Contempt is Corroding Democracy"	September 2022	
88	Katharine Murphy	"Lone Wolf: Albanese and the New Politics"	November 2022	
89	Saul Griffith	"The Wires That Bind: Electrification and Community Renewal"	March 2023	
90	Megan Davis	"Voice of Reason: On Recognition and Renewal"	June 2023	
91	Micheline Lee	"Lifeboat: Disability, Humanity and the NDIS"	September 2023	
92	Alan Kohler	"The Great Divide: Australia's Housing Mess and How to Fix It"	November 2023	
93	Lech Blaine	"Bad Cop: Peter Dutton's Strongman Politics"	March 2024	
94	Joelle Gergis	"Highway to Hell: Climate Change and Australia's Future"	June 2024	
95	Don Watson	"High Noon: Trump, Harris and America on the Brink"	September 2024	
96	George Megalogenis	"Minority Report: The New Shape of Australian Politics"	November 2024	
97	Jess Hill	"Losing It: Can we stop violence against women and children?"	March 2025	
98	Hugh White	"Hard New World: Our Post-American Future"	June 2025	
99	Marian Wilkinson	"Woodside vs the Planet: How a Company Captured a Country"	September 2025	
100	Sean Kelly	"The Good Fight: What Does Labor Stand For?"	November 2025	
101	Michael Wesley	"Blind Spot: Southeast Asia and Australia's future"	March 2026	
