= Joëlle Gergis =

Australian climate scientist

Joëlle Gergis is an Australian climate scientist and author specialising in Southern Hemisphere climate variability and climate change. Her research fields include climatology, weather extremes, paleoclimatology, and Australian history. In 2013, Gergis was awarded an Australian Research Council Discovery Early Career Researcher Award fellowship, and her team won the 2014 Eureka Prize for Excellence in Interdisciplinary Scientific Research. She was a lead author for the Intergovernmental Panel on Climate Change's Sixth Assessment Report in 2022. Joëlle is currently an honorary associate professor of climate science at the University of Melbourne.

== Education ==
Gergis completed a BSc in Advanced Science (Environmental Science) at the University of New South Wales in 2000. She has authored over 130 climate variability and change publications. Her work has been covered on Australian and international television. Gergis received her PhD in high-resolution palaeoclimatology from the University of New South Wales in 2006.

== Scientific career ==
In 2007 Gergis was one of three national finalists for the Eureka Prize for Young Leaders in Environmental Issues and Climate Change, and was one of nineteen Wentworth Group of Concerned Scientists’ Science Leaders Scholarship recipients selected nationwide. Tim Flannery, the 2007 Australian of the Year, was one of her mentors during the program aimed at training outstanding young scientists to help bridge the communication gap between science and public policy. In 2008, Gergis was nominated for a Reuters/IUCN Awards for Excellence in Environmental Journalism for feature writing.

Between 2009 and 2014 Gergis led the Aus2K working group for international environmental research organisation Past Global Changes (PAGES), which aimed to improve the accuracy of future climate projections by reconstructing the past 2000 years of climate across the world. The Aus2K group studied Australasian climate variability over the previous 2,000 years, coordinating the development of a 1,000-year temperature reconstruction of the region for the IPCC Fifth Assessment Report. One of the studies involved using climate proxies such as tree-rings, lake sediments, corals, and ice cores to recreate past temperatures including the meteorological conditions the First Fleet endured, as documented by William Bradley aboard the HMS Sirius, and examining claims about a mediaeval warm period. Gergis was the lead author in a study published in the Journal of Climate and drawing on decades of work by 30 scientists.

In 2012 Gergis was awarded an Australian Research Council (ARC) Discovery Early Career Researcher Award (DECRA) fellowship, and her team won the 2014 Eureka Prize for Excellence in Interdisciplinary Scientific Research. In 2015, Gergis was awarded the Dean's Award for Excellence in Research in the Faculty of Science at the University of Melbourne.

In February 2018 she was selected to serve as a lead author for the Intergovernmental Panel on Climate Change (IPCC) Sixth Assessment Report. In August 2018, Gergis joined the Climate Council – Australia's leading independent body providing expert advice to the Australian public on climate change and policy.

== Writing ==
In 2013 Gergis completed the Royal Melbourne Institute of Technology's esteemed Diploma of Professional Writing and Editing. She has published articles in publications including the Sydney Morning Herald, The Saturday Paper, The Guardian, The Monthly, Australasian Science, The Conversation, Crikey, Cosmos science magazine and Wet Ink. In June 2012 she was awarded a Writers Victoria Grace Marion Wilson Fellowship for an Emerging Writer.

Gergis has published three books: Sunburnt Country: The History and Future of Climate Change in Australia (2018), Humanity's Moment: A Climate Scientist's Case for Hope (2022), and Highway to Hell: Climate Change and Australia's Future (Quarterly Essay issue 94, 2024). She contributed chapters to The Climate Book, edited by Greta Thunberg (2022), and Not Too Late: Changing the Climate Story from Despair to Possibility, edited by Rebecca Solnit and Thelma Young Lutunatabua (2023).
