= Osman Faruqi =

Australian political journalist

- Born: c.1990 Pakistan
- Occupation: Journalist
- Parent(s): Mehreen Faruqi, Omar Faruqi

Osman Faruqi (born c.1990) is a Pakistani-born Australian political and entertainment journalist.

Faruqi was the culture news editor of The Sydney Morning Herald and The Age between February 2022 and August 2024. Previously he was Schwartz Media's head of audio, presenter of The Culture podcast, and editor of daily news podcast, 7am. He worked as the deputy editor of the Australian Broadcasting Corporation's ABC Life and as a reporter with the ABC's investigative audio program, Background Briefing, and was the former political editor at Junkee. He is also known as a contributor to The Guardian, The Saturday Paper and others.

== Biography ==
Faruqi was born in Pakistan and came to Australia at the age of two. He is the son of the Australian Greens senator Mehreen Faruqi. As a student at the University of New South Wales Faruqi served as the president of the Student Representative Council in 2010. In the 2015 New South Wales state election, Faruqi stood as the Australian Greens candidate for the seat of Heffron, receiving 21.1% of the first-preference vote. Faruqi is a Muslim and has commented on the difficulty of facing prejudice as a Muslim in Australia in the wake of the September 11 attacks.

In addition to his work as a journalist, Faruqi has also worked as a higher education policy adviser for the Australian Greens in the office of NSW Senator Lee Rhiannon. After nearly ten years as an active member of the Greens, Faruqi stepped down from his roles in the party in 2015.

He chairs an awards panel for the State Library of New South Wales.

As of 2020 Faruqi was writing a book about race relations in Australia, which was expected to be published in 2021.

== Journalistic career ==
Faruqi frequently writes on issues related to Australian politics, culture, and identity. He frequently writes on matters related to racial, ethnic and cultural identity in Australia, including the government's approach to Black Lives Matter, anti-Muslim sentiment in Australia, and the threat of far-right terrorism in Australia.

Faruqi has written critically about the response to COVID-19 in Victoria. He has criticised the application of compliance fines for breaches of COVID-19 regulations, arguing that these have been disproportionately targeted at migrant and Indigenous Australians.

Faruqi has been highly critical of what he calls "racist fear mongering" in Australian media coverage of the purported "African gangs" issue in Melbourne. Faruqi has noted that senior police officials in Victoria have expressed skepticism about the claim of a widespread crisis related to crime committed by African Australians in Melbourne.

In an extended essay for Meanjin in 2016, Faruqi was highly critical of what he regarded as inadequate ethnic diversity in Australian media. In 2018, Faruqi publicly criticised his fellow ABC journalist Sarah Ferguson for interviewing far-right figure and former Trump advisor Steve Bannon, contending that she failed to properly interrogate Bannon's extreme views on race, and had "thrown me and other PoC (people of colour) under the bus".

Despite his background as a former Australian Greens candidate and advisor, Faruqi criticised the party in 2016, saying it needed to "re-evaluate and radically overhaul its current approach" in order to escape minor party status.

In the wake of the Christchurch massacre, Faruqi was critical of what he described as a political climate of "normalising hatred and racism" that had led to far-right radicalisation in Australia. In August 2018, Faruqi was doxxed by a far-right activist Avi Yemini and was "inundated with racist text message and phone calls". He was targeted on Twitter before he deleted his Twitter account.

=== Lamestream ===
In April 2025, Faruqi and Scott Mitchell launched the independent media company Lamestream media. Before Lamesteam, Mitchell had previously worked on Schwartz Media's "7am" podcast.

== Defamation case ==
In 2018, Faruqi successfully sued former Australian Labor Party leader and NSW Senator Mark Latham (One Nation leader from 2018 to 2023) for defamation. Latham had accused Faruqi of "aiding and abetting Islamic terrorism" and fostering "anti-white racism in Australia" in a broadcast of his online politics show Mark Latham's Outsiders made on 2 August 2017. The following day, the Daily Mail ran a story broadcasting Latham's comments, including a subheading claiming Faruqi and fellow Australian Muslim Yassmin Abdel-Magied were "giving encouragement to terrorist fanatics who kill innocent people". Faruqi subsequently received a torrent of online abuse, including death threats. When interviewed later by The Monthly, Faruqi said that "being accused of being a terrorist when you’re a brown guy from a Muslim background in Australia is a pretty scary thing". Latham's protracted 76-page defence was described by the judge as "extraordinary" and drew ridicule in the Australian press for its length and incoherence.

In the wake of the judgment, Faruqi stated that he hoped that the case would demonstrate that "while robust debate is part of a healthy democracy, using your platform to harm the reputation of individuals comes at a cost".
