= Fault line (disambiguation) =

In geology, fault line or faultline refers to the surface trace of a fault.

Fault line may also refer to:

== Books ==
- Fault Line, a 2009 thriller by Barry Eisler
- Fault Lines, a 1989 novel by Stan Leventhal
- Faultlines: Cultural Materialism and the Politics of Dissident Reading, a 1992 book by Alan Sinfield
- Faultlines (Megalogenis book), a 2003 book by George Megalogenis
- Fault Lines (novel) a 2007 novel by Nancy Huston, originally published under the name Lignes de Faille
- Fault Lines: How Hidden Fractures Still Threaten the World Economy, a 2010 book by Indian economist Raghuram Rajan
- Fault Lines, a 2015 book by David Pryce-Jones

== Film and television ==
- Fault Line, a 2009 and upcoming film directed by Lucas Elliot Eberl
- Fault Lines (TV series), a documentary series produced and broadcast by Al Jazeera English
- "Fault Lines" (Law & Order: UK), a 2011 television episode
- "Faultlines" (Scott & Bailey), a 2011 television episode

== Role-playing games ==
- Fault Line (adventure), a role-playing game adventure

== Music ==
- Faultline (musician), electronic music project centred on producer David Kosten
- Faultline Records, an independent record label based in Melbourne, Australia

=== Albums ===
- Faultline (album), a 1989 album by Birdsongs of the Mesozoic
- Faultlines (album), a 2003 album by Karine Polwart
- Fault Lines (album), a 2012 album by Turboweekend

=== Songs ===
- "Faultline", a song by The Haunted from Versus
- "Faultline", a song by Saliva from Every Six Seconds
- "Faultline", a song by Silverchair from Frogstomp
- "Fault Line", a song by 10 Years from The Autumn Effect
- "Fault Line", a song by August Burns Red from Rescue & Restore
- "Fault Line", a song by Jack River from Sugar Mountain
- "Fault Line", a song by Polaris from Fatalism
- "Faultlines", a song by Lanterns on the Lake from Beings
- "Faultlines", a song by Suede from Bloodsports
- "Fault Lines", a song by Intronaut from Void
- "Fault Lines", a song by Tom Petty & the Heartbreakers from Hypnotic Eye
- "Fault Lines", a song by Amanda Shires from Take It Like a Man
- "FAULTLINE", a song by STARSET from Divisions
- "Fault Lines", a song by The Mountain Goats from All Hail West Texas

== See also ==
- Crevasse
- Fracture (geology) or crevice
