= Karen Hitchcock =

Karen Hitchcock may refer to:

- Karen R. Hitchcock (1943–2019), American biologist and university administrator
- Karen Hitchcock (author), Australian author and medical doctor
