= Judith Brett =

Australian political scientist and writer (born 1949)

Judith Margaret Brett
- Born: 1949 (age 76–77); Melbourne, Australia
- Awards: Ernest Scott Prize (1993, 2004); Member of the Order of Australia (2023)

Academic background
- Education: University of Melbourne (BA) (PhD); University of Oxford (DipSocAnth)
- Thesis: The Milk of Language: A Psycho-Analytic Interpretation of Hugo von Hofmannsthal's Chandos Crisis (1980)
- Influences: Professor Alan Davies; Dr Graham Little; Mr Geoff Sharp.

Academic work
- Institutions: La Trobe University (1989–2012)
- Main interests: Cultural history, political history
- Notable works: Australian Liberals and the Moral Middle Class (2003); Robert Menzies' Forgotten People (1992)

Judith Margaret Brett AM (born 1949, Melbourne) is an Emeritus Professor of politics at La Trobe University, Melbourne, Australia. She retired from La Trobe in 2012, after a restructuring of the Faculty of Humanities and Social Sciences in which the School of which she was head was dismantled.

== Education ==
Her PhD from Melbourne University's Politics Department in the 1970s was a psychoanalytic study of the crisis of language of the Austrian fin-de-siècle poet Hugo von Hofmannsthal and of its resolution. Brett was a member of an informal group of humanities academics, psychoanalysts and psychotherapists interested in applied psychoanalysis centred in the politics department around Professor Alan Davies and Dr Graham Little. It was called the Melbourne Psycho-social Group and was theoretically eclectic, with interest focussed on Melanie Klein, Heinz Kohut, Wilfred Bion and Jacques Lacan. Davies supervised her PhD. Little applied psychonalytic ideas to the study of politics, and wrote regularly on Australian political leaders during the 1980s and 1990s.

== Career in academia ==
Brett lectured in Australian politics at the University of Melbourne from 1980 to 1982, when she was appointed as the editor of the literary quarterly, Meanjin, succeeding the second editor, Jim Davidson. This was a part-time position and she edited Meanjin from 1982 to the end of 1986 when her third daughter was born. In 1987 she was books editor for the short-lived Times on Sunday and in 1989 she was appointed to a lectureship in Australian politics at La Trobe University where she worked until her retirement.

During the 1970s and 1980s as well as being a member of the Psycho-social Group Brett was involved with the left week quarterly journal, Arena, attending seminars and discussions and occasionally writing. In 1992, when the Arena group started a bi-monthly magazine, Arena Magazine, she became one of the editors, with Guy Rundle and Alison Caddick. During the 1990s she also wrote a regular column on contemporary politics for the Melbourne Age.

== Publications ==
Her first book was published in 1992, a psychoanalytically-informed biographical study of Australian Prime Minister Robert Menzies, titled Robert Menzies' Forgotten People. It took as its central text Menzies' 1942 radio broadcast, 'The Forgotten People', which it included at the start of the book, making it easily available. The book won the 1993 Ernest Scott prize for a work of Australasian political history, the 1993 Victorian Premier's Prize for Australian Studies, and shared the 1993 NSW Premier's prize for nonfictio. Her use of psychoanalysis came in for some attack, especially from Gerard Henderson. The book was re-issued by Melbourne University Press in 2007 with an introduction by Brett on the book's origins, theoretical context and reception. In 2023 it was featured in Australian Historical Studies' Landmark Histories series.

In 1997 Brett edited a collection of psychoanalytically-informed essays on Australian politicians titled Political Lives, which included essays by Little and herself as well as other members of the Melbourne psychosocial group, James Walter and Angus McIntyre. In the lead essay on 'The Tasks of Political Biography' Brett defended the place of psychoanalytic insights in the tool kit of political biographers.

From 1998 to 2000 Brett was the visiting Keith Cameron Professor of Australian history at University College Dublin. In 2003 she published Australian Liberals and the Moral Middle Class: From Alfred Deakin to John Howard, which also won the Ernest Scott prize for history. It was an archivally-based study of the history of the Liberal Party and its predecessors, focussing on the interaction between party philosophy and the experiences of those who voted for it. Published when John Howard was Prime Minister, she argued that he was the most creative Liberal leader since Robert Menzies, in the way he had linked the Liberal Party to the popular nationalism of the Australian legend and positioned Labor as the party of the elites. This argument was the basis of her first Quarterly Essay, 'Relaxed and Comfortable: The Liberal Party's Australia'.

The Essay included portraits of four ordinary Australians who supported John Howard and the Liberal Party. The portraits were based on multiple qualitative interviews with participants in a project called Ordinary People's Politics. It was a continuation of a project undertaken in the late 1980s by Alan Davies and Graeme Little called 'Images of Australia: Constructions of Nationality, Class, Gender and Authority'. Using the same interview schedule, in 2002 some of the participants from this project were re-interviewed as well as new ones recruited. The focus was shifted from images of the nation to the understanding of change, and the results were published in a book, co-authored by Judith Brett and Anthony Moran, titled Ordinary People's Politics: Australians talk about life, politics and the future of their country.

Brett published three more Quarterly Essays: Exit Right on the defeat of the Howard government at the 2007 election; Fair Share on the politics of the relationship between the country and the city in Australia; and The Coal Curse, on the politics of climate change.

In 2017 Brett published a biography of early Australian Liberal Prime Minister, Alfred Deakin, titled The Enigmatic Mr Deakin. It was shortlisted for the 2018 NSW history award, the 2018 Prime Minister's History award and won the 2018 National Biography Award. Her next book, From Secret Ballot to Democracy Sausage: How Australia got Compulsory Voting, was shortlisted for tthe 2020 Prime Ministers' History Award and the 2019 Queensland Literary Awards University of Southern Queensland History Book Award. Brett was appointed a Member of the Order of Australia in the 2023 Australia Day Honours.

In 2024 she published a biography of the feminist abortion activist Beatrice Faust who, in 1972, founded the Women's Electoral Lobby. Fearless Beatrice Faust, was shortlisted for the Australian history prize at the 2026 Prime Minister's Literary Awards.

== Bibliography ==
=== As author ===
- Brett, Judith, Australian Liberals and the Moral Middle Class (2003), Cambridge University Press, ISBN 0 521 53634 0
- with Anthony Moran, Ordinary Peoples' Politics (2006), Pluto Press Australia, ISBN 978-1-864-03257-4
- — 百年回顧: 中國國民黨駐澳洲總支部歷史文物彙編 [A century of review: A collection of historical relics of the Chinese Kuomintang's Australian branch] / Unlocking the History of the Australasian Kuo Min Tang 1911–2013 (2013), Australian Scholarly Publishing, ISBN 978-1-925-003 260
- — Robert Menzies' Forgotten People (2007), Melbourne University Press, ISBN 978-0-522-85391-9
- — The Enigmatic Mr Deakin (2018), Text Publishing, ISBN 978-1-925-60371-2
- — From Secret Ballot to Democracy Sausage: How Australia Got Compulsory Voting (2019), Text Publishing, ISBN 978-1-925-60384-2
- — Fearless Beatrice Faust: Sex, Feminism and Body Politics (2024), Text Publishing, ISBN 9781923058316

=== As editor ===
- Brett, Judith, Political Lives (1997) Allen & Unwin, ISBN 978-1-74269-679-9

=== Journal articles and Quarterly Essays ===
- Quarterly Essay 19 Relaxed & Comfortable: The Liberal Party's Australia (2005) ISBN 978-1-86395-094-7
- Quarterly Essay 28 Exit Right: The Unravelling of John Howard (2007) ISBN 978-1-86395-111-1
- Quarterly Essay 42 Fair Share: Country and City in Australia (2011) ISBN 978-1-86395-526-3
- — (August 2014). "Freedom, or nothing left to lose". The Nation Reviewed. The Monthly. 103: 8–10. (Online version is titled "Must we choose between climate-change action and freedom of speech?".)
- Quarterly Essay 78 The Coal Curse: Resources, Climate and Australia's Future (2020) ISBN 978-1-76064-229-7
