= The Medicine: A Doctor's Notes =

Book by Karen Hitchcock

The medicine
- Cover
- Author: Karen Hitchcock
- Original title: The Medicine: a Doctor's Notes
- Language: English
- Subject: Medicine
- Genre: Non-fiction
- Publisher: Black Inc. (an imprint of Schwartz Publishing)
- Publication date: February 4, 2020
- Publication place: Australia
- ISBN: 978-1743821275

The Medicine: a Doctor's Notes is a 2020 book by Karen Hitchcock published by Black Inc. This book offers a comprehensive examination of various aspects of medical treatment as Hitchcock discusses a wide range of topics, including the treatment of common ailments such as the flu, medical procedures like plastic surgery, and the broader challenges within the healthcare system. The author also emphasizes the importance of not only prescribing medication but also actively listening to the patient's experiences to improve overall health.

== Overview ==
In The Medicine, Hitchcock emphasizes the importance of recognizing that healthcare extends beyond clinical settings and is deeply intertwined with life itself. Her perspective as a physician allowed her to connect with patients on a personal level. In the book, Hitchcock delves into the complexities of the healthcare system and the medical profession, addressing common doubts regarding individual roles within this intricate system.

The book provides insights into Hitchcock's experiences treating patients and reflects on the exclusivity often associated with the medical profession, especially the challenges in attaining specialization. She questions the role of empathy and the prevailing emphasis on cost-effectiveness within the healthcare system. Her exploration of these issues is reminiscent of her earlier work, "Dear Life: On Caring for the Elderly", where she raised questions about caring for the elderly.

Hitchcock discusses the research, approval processes, marketing, and the potential limitations of pharmaceuticals. She also encourages readers to view pharmaceuticals as commercial products that may not always offer solutions to health concerns.

The book also highlights the societal actions needed to promote health, including physical activity, healthy eating, education, community involvement, and meaningful work. Hitchcock challenges the notion that health can be solely achieved through the development and consumption of drugs, raising the question of whether a society committed to prevention is more idealistic than one reliant on "magic pills."

Hitchcock does not shy away from addressing uncomfortable ideas, such as her revisit of the 2013 essay "Fat City," which received attention and criticism from the body positivity movement.

The book includes an essay on Andrew Denton's podcast, Better Off Dead, offering a critique of the portrayal of euthanasia in the media.
