= Peter McEvoy (disambiguation) =

Peter McEvoy (1953–2025) was a British golfer.

Peter McEvoy may also refer to:

- Peter McEvoy (journalist), Australian journalist
- Peter David McEvoy, a suspect in the Walsh Street police shootings
