= Dark Victory (disambiguation) =

Dark Victory is a 1939 film based on a 1934 stageplay.

Dark Victory may also refer to:

In literature:

- Dark Victory (book), a book by David Marr and Marian Wilkinson
- Dark Victory (novel), a Star Trek novel by William Shatner
- A Dark Victory, a novel in the Tenabran Trilogy by Dave Luckett
- Batman: Dark Victory, a comic book series
- Dark Victory: The Life of Bette Davis, a book by Ed Sikov
- Dark Victory: Ronald Reagan, MCA, and the Mob, a 1986 non-fiction book by Dan E. Moldea

In television:

- "Dark Victory", an episode of Frasier
- "Dark Victory", the two-part series finale of Legion of Super Heroes
- Dark Victory, a 1976 remake of the 1939 film, starring Elizabeth Montgomery
