= Q+A (Australian talk show) =

2008–2025 Australian television series

- Title card
- Created by: Peter McEvoy
- Country of origin: Australia
- Original language: English
- No. of seasons: 17
- No. of episodes: 598+ (list of episodes)

Production
- Executive producer: Erin Vincent
- Production locations: Ultimo, New South Wales, Australia
- Running time: Approximately 60 minutes

Original release
- Network: ABC (2008–2025); ABC News (2010–2015); Australia Network (2011–2014)
- Release: 22 May 2008 – 19 May 2025

Related
- ABC National Forum

Q+A, formerly Q&A and also stylised as QandA, was an Australian television panel discussion program broadcast on ABC Television. The show, which ran continuously from 2008 until its discontinuation in 2025, was broadcast on Monday nights at 9:35 pm. Its format was similar to Question Time on the BBC and Questions and Answers on RTÉ.

== History ==
Q+A was created as Q&A by founding executive producer Peter McEvoy, Presented by Tony Jones, the show premiered on Thursday, 22 May 2008, at 9:35 pm on ABC TV, featuring a solo appearance by prime minister Kevin Rudd. From the following week, it adopted a regular format of panellists, generally comprising politicians and three additional people representing various sectors of society and occupations.

In 2010, Q&A moved to Monday nights and aired a full season of 40 episodes. From 26 April 2010, Q+A introduced a Twitter feed; selected tweets discussing Q+A live started to be displayed on screen. From October 2010, Q+A was simulcast live on ABC News, allowing it to be viewed live across the country. In March 2015, ABC News ceased simulcast of Q+A.

In August 2015, following the Zaky Mallah incident, the ABC moved the show from its entertainment division to the news division, which would subject it to more oversight and stricter guidelines.

Q&A was presented by Tony Jones and produced by Peter McEvoy from its inception until 2019. Virginia Trioli, Annabel Crabb, Julia Baird, Tom Ballard, and Jeremy Fernandez filled in for Jones while he was on leave.

In January 2020 the program's name styling was changed from using an ampersand (Q&A ) to a plus sign (Q+A). At the end of 2020, the show moved to Thursday nights, but moved back to Monday nights in 2023, after appointing Stan Grant as host from August 2022.

In August 2023, during the show's "Garma Special", Q+A received its lowest ratings ever, with fewer than 84,000 metro viewers. In 2023 the show recovered to a median metro audience of 800,000, but remained one of the ABC's least-watched broadcasts. From 2024, the ABC cut the number of annual episodes from 40 to 24. Patricia Karvelas, who took over as a fill-in in 2023, was appointed as permanent host, with Eliza Harvey becoming executive producer.

On 11 June 2025, the program was cancelled by the ABC after 18 years on air.

== Hosts ==
Host	Tenure
Tony Jones	2008–2019
Hamish Macdonald	2020–2021
David Speers	2021–2023
Virginia Trioli	2021–2022
Stan Grant	2021–2023
Dan Bourchier	2023
Amelia Moseley (BTN Student Specials)	2018–2023
Patricia Karvelas	2023–2025

In November 2019, the ABC announced that Hamish Macdonald would replace Jones as host from February 2020. Jones hosted his final episode of Q+A on Monday 9 December 2019, and the program was renamed Q+A from the first episode of 2020, hosted by Macdonald. In February 2021, Q+A moved back to its original timeslot of Thursday night at 8:30 pm. From its peak of over 600,000 viewers, the programme suffered a substantial reduction down to a record low of just above 200,000 viewers across the five major capital cities in April 2021.

Macdonald resigned in July 2021, citing the overwhelming amount of personal abuse and trolling on social media, and then subsequently in person, that he suffered as a result of hosting the show as a reason for quitting. He returned to Network 10's current affairs and talk show The Project, after which Q+A was hosted by a rotating series of hosts until the end of the year. The three rotating hosts, Stan Grant, David Speers, and Virginia Trioli, were appointed to continue in an ongoing capacity through until July 2022.

In July 2022, the ABC announced that Stan Grant would permanently host the show from 1 August. In May 2023, Grant resigned from the show after “grotesque racist abuse, including threats to his safety”. The abuse followed an ABC panel discussion which preceded the coronation of Charles III, on which he was a guest. He said that he was disappointed by the lack of support by the ABC over the abuse.

Patricia Karvelas took over as a fill-in and was appointed as permanent host in 2024.

== Format ==
As of 2024 Q+A runs on Monday nights in six-week slots over the year, hosted by Patricia Karvelas. It generally features a panel of five public figures, usually including politicians from each of the major federal parties (Labor and Liberal) as well as minor party politicians, media personalities, academics and celebrities, answering questions provided by viewers and the studio audience. On occasion, the show features a sole notable individual, such as the Prime Minister or Leader of the Opposition. The program was broadcast live (in the eastern states) on ABC TV and online, in front of a studio audience, and is available afterwards on ABC iview.

The program was usually broadcast from the ABC's studios in the Sydney suburb of Ultimo, but was sometimes broadcast from various Australian metropolitan and rural centres. Audience participation was a key aspect of the program, with producers selecting members who represent "a diverse and well-balanced" group.

== Notable episodes ==
=== Shoe-throwing ===
On 25 October 2010, former Prime Minister John Howard had a pair of shoes thrown at him from a member of the audience due to responses on his attitude to the Iraq War. The shoe-thrower was subsequently removed from the audience. Although Howard seemed indifferent to the incident, it was criticised by both Prime Minister Julia Gillard and Opposition Leader Tony Abbott, among other members of Parliament from both the Government and the Opposition. The shoe-thrower, environmental activist Peter Gray, died of cancer six months later; before he died, however, he asked the ABC to auction his shoes and the money to be donated to the Red Cross. Tony Jones announced the auction on the show on 9 May 2011, saying: "Before he died he asked that the shoes, which we kept, be auctioned for charity and the money given to the International Committee for the Red Cross for its work in Iraq. Former Prime Minister John Howard has expressed sorrow at Mr Gray's death and endorsed this idea. So the shoes, which symbolise the [sic] their disagreement over Iraq, will now be used to provide practical help to people in Iraq." The auction was won by Volley for $3,650.

=== University student protest ===
The show was disrupted on 5 May 2014, when a group of university students began protesting against proposed higher education cuts. The group unfurled a banner over the back of the set and began to chant at Minister for Education Christopher Pyne, before they were removed from the studio while the live broadcast was replaced with footage of a musical performance from an earlier episode. In the lead-up to the protest, Pyne was the subject of several questions regarding education cuts and was heckled by members of the Socialist Alternative.

=== Zaky Mallah incident ===
Front pages of News Corp owned tabloids referring to the incident

The Zaky Mallah incident stirred great controversy and led to a boycott of Q+A by the Abbott government, after a former terror suspect was invited to ask a question of a minister from the live audience. Zaky Mallah had been convicted of threatening to kill Commonwealth officials in 2003, but found not guilty of terrorism offences in 2005. Prior to his appearance on the program, Mallah had tweeted derogatorily and lewdly about two female News Ltd columnists, Miranda Devine and Rita Panahi, mentioning gang banging them. He was known to Q+A's editorial team, attending three shows as an audience member since 2011, and twice being rejected as a panel member, but they were not aware of the misogynist tweets; Jones said that he would not have been allowed on the programme had they known.

On 22 June 2015, Mallah posed a pre-approved question about terrorism laws to Parliamentary secretary Steven Ciobo, who was on the Q+A panel that night: "What would have happened if my [terrorism] case had been decided by the Minister and not the courts?" and confirmed he had pleaded guilty to threatening to kill officials. Ciobo replied that he understood that the acquittal was based on a technicality, so would be happy to see the government remove Mallah from the country. Mallah later was directed to respond, saying "The Liberals now have just justified to many Australian Muslims in the community tonight to leave and go to Syria and join ISIS because of ministers like him". Jones called these comments "totally out of order". Mallah later wrote that he "hates ISIS" and his comments were "misinterpreted".

The following day, the ABC published an apology for including Mallah on a live event, admitting to an error of judgement, and around a week later the ABC board appointed Shaun Brown and Ray Martin to do an independent audit of the show, and issued a formal warning to Q+A executive producer Peter McEvoy. ABC director Mark Scott conceded the producers had erred putting Mallah on live television, but defended the independence of the ABC's editorial decisions and argued there is merit in platforming "views that run contrary to accepted public values" in order to "understand the root cause" of alarming actions.

Following the incident, the ABC reported that it had received over 1000 complaints over its decision to allow Mallah into the audience. The decision was criticised by Labor deputy leader Tanya Plibersek, and Prime Minister Tony Abbott banned members of his frontbench appearing on the program. He later offered to permit them if the show was moved from the ABC's Television section to News and Current Affairs. Substantially negative coverage of the ABC's conduct appeared in News Corporation-owned papers, including The Daily Telegraph and The Australian. Other commentators defended the ABC, including Ray Martin, Peter Greste, Jonathan Holmes, and Richard Ackland.

In August 2015 the ABC moved the show from its entertainment division to the news division, which would subject it to more oversight and stricter guidelines. In November 2015, Tony Jones said the furore and boycott was based on a "big lie" [that Mallah supported ISIS].

=== Duncan Storrar ===
Duncan Storrar asked assistant government minister Kelly O'Dwyer a question on tax-free thresholds, asking why poorer people were not receiving similar tax relief from the Coalition government. He quickly gained widespread support as an embodiment for the 'battling Aussie'. The publicity from his question caused various media outlets to cover his life, with some outlets publishing allegations that he was a drug addict and that he had previously failed to care for his family. Storrar became traumatised as a result of his harsh media treatment. A crowdfunding campaign was started to buy him a new toaster, which played on O'Dwyer's remarks about depreciation treatment for small business, namely cafes.

=== Yassmin Abdel-Magied ===
In February 2017, panellist Yassmin Abdel-Magied defended sharia law, arguing that Islam is "the most feminist" of all religions. On the same program, Abdel-Magied stated in response to another panellist, Jacqui Lambie, that Sharia law is as simple as "me praying five times day," and that it says in Islam, "you follow the law of the land on which you are on". Some Islamic scholars have disputed this saying "they must comply with the laws of their country of residence without, at the same time, disobeying Islamic law."

=== Q+A Broadside ===
On 4 November 2019, Q+A hosted a special show in conjunction with The Wheeler Centre's Broadside festival of feminist ideas. The show aired content including swearing and discussions about violence. This led to hundreds of complaints being filed against the ABC about language and viewpoints, resulting in the ABC network opening an investigation into whether the show violated editorial standards. Panellists included Mona Eltahawy; author Jess Hill; Nayuka Gorrie; Ashton Applewhite; Hana Assafiri; and host, Fran Kelly.

=== 2022 Russian invasion of Ukraine ===
On 3 March 2022, Q+A fielded several questions on the 2022 Russian invasion of Ukraine by Russia. A Russian-Australian audience member, Sasha Gillies-Lekakis, saying that there were a lot of Russians both in Australia and around the world who support Putin's actions, and accusing the Ukrainian Government of collaborating with "Nazi groups like the Azov Battalion in "besieg[ing] the Russian populations in the Donbas, killing an estimated 13,000 people", asked the panel why grief and concern had not been expressed for those Russians. Host Stan Grant pointed out that the UN had recorded 13,000 deaths in total (both sides) since the conflict began in 2014. Some time later, after other questions and discussions, Grant asked that Gillies-Lekakis leave the studio. Grant apologised for not having ejected him directly after his question, saying "We can’t have people advocating violence, and I should have asked you to leave". After an argument with another audience member, the questioner was ejected from the studio by security.

The ABC posted an explanation of the incident afterwards on the Q+A website:

Sasha Gillies-Lekakis did not ask the question that he had agreed (Note: The question as submitted by Gillies-Lekakis before the show read "Since 2014, the Ukraine has besieged the Russian-majority populations in Donbas, in flagrant violation of the Minsk Agreement. The UN estimates 13,000 people have been killed in the conflict".) and what he said instead contained major inaccuracies. He was asked to finish his question and the issue was aired in the panel discussion. As the program developed, Stan Grant, a highly experienced presenter of live TV, was aware that other audience members were distressed. After careful consideration he decided the best course of action was for Mr Gillies-Lekakis to leave the studio, which was live-to-air. The ABC fully supports his judgement and handling of this situation.

Discussion of the incident followed in the media, with commentators agreeing that Gillies-Lukakis deserved a strong rebuttal for "promoting Russian propaganda", but that sending him out gave the appearance of "weakness rather than the moral and intellectual strength these times demand".

== Reception ==
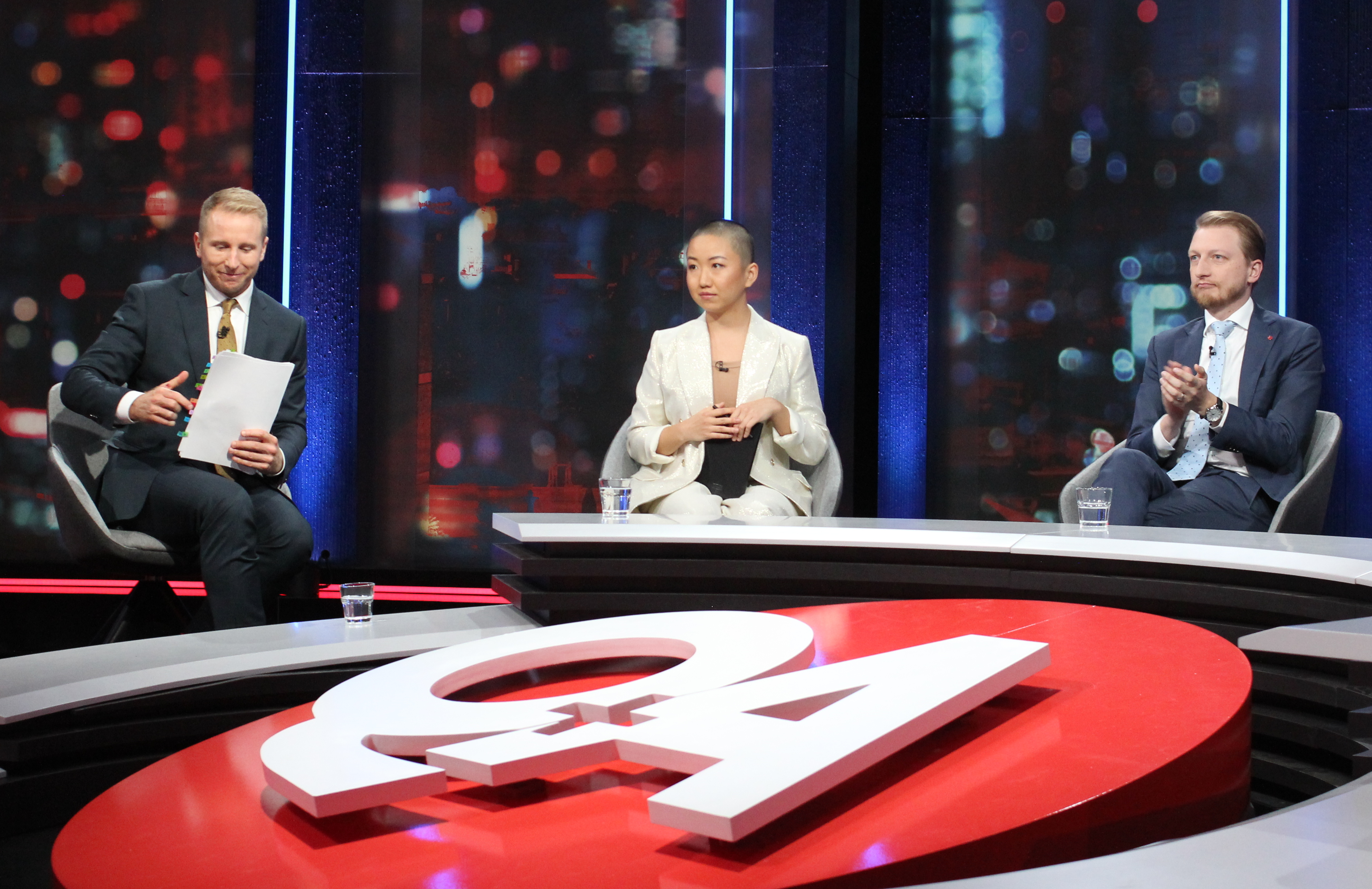
A Q+A episode hosted by Hamish Macdonald, featuring Vicky Xu (centre) and Senator James Paterson (right)

=== Acclaim ===
Journalist David Marr said in 2015 "The ABC has only created a handful of great shows in recent years and Q+A is one of them".

Former Liberal leader John Hewson said of the show in 2015: "I think you get few opportunities in politics to get your message across, and Q+A is one of them".

=== Criticism ===
Journalist Paul Barry noted on the ABC Media Watch program in July 2015 that Q+A had been criticised for "being biased to the left". Various high-profile Liberal-National politicians, conservative journalists and political commentators have complained of bias.

After Tony Jones joked in 2014 that a new conservative party led by then-Liberal Cory Bernardi could be called "Cory Bernardi's Golden Dawn", right-wing columnist Andrew Bolt described Jones as a "Leftist" who has had to make repeated apologies for the treatment of conservatives on the show. In March 2015, during a debate on feminism, Liberal Deputy Leader Julie Bishop told the audience that she did not believe Tony Jones interrupted her because of gender, but because of her politics. In May 2015, Senator James McGrath (Liberal National Party of Queensland) raised the issue with ABC Managing Director Mark Scott in Senate Estimates, complaining of consistent bias against "those on the right or centre-right of politics".

After the Mallah incident, former Liberal Prime Minister Tony Abbott reportedly told his party room that the program is a "lefty lynch mob". In his first appearance on the show as Prime Minister in June 2016, Malcolm Turnbull described Tony Jones as "a very good spokesman for the ALP". The Australian journalist Janet Albrechtsen wrote that she was boycotting the program because "Free speech on Q+A means stacking the panel, the audience and the questions to skew left." Albrechtsen was one of the programme's most frequent guests. Piers Akerman wrote in The Daily Telegraph that the show was scripted and directed by Jones. Liberal power broker Michael Kroger and conservative journalists Miranda Devine and Tom Switzer also boycott the show.

Broadcaster Steve Price described a July 2016 question put to him about violence against women and the ensuing verbal altercation he had with journalist Van Badham as an "ambush". Price's comment was made in the wake of widespread public condemnation for his repeatedly interrupting Badham and insisting she was "hysterical" as she responded to a questioner who had described the violent murder of his sister.

=== Independent audit ===
An internal review commissioned by the ABC in the wake of the Mallah incident, conducted by television journalist Ray Martin and former SBS managing director Shaun Brown, noted that "The most commonly expressed criticism was that the program lacks impartiality and maintains a left wing anti-Coalition bias"; however, this criticism was found to be "not substantiated".

After participating in the audit of the program, which entailed watching 23 programs of Q+A repeatedly and examining the transcripts, Martin wrote: "Q+A is a top-rating, professional but tightly-controlled, live television discussion, in which the only thing that's unpredictable are the panellists' answers... like it or loathe it, Q+A discusses serious politics and important social issues at a more intelligent level than anywhere else on Australian television". He noted however that the only "chronic imbalance" within the show was of an under-representation of women on the panel and that it was "Sydney-centric", mainly because it operates on a tight budget. He also told Sunrise that the Abbott government's boycott of the program was "silly" and that he suspected "Tony Jones was just as tough on the Labor government as he is on the Coalition".

Following the review, Gerard Henderson wrote that the ABC had engaged "leftists" who cleared the program of "being accused of leftism".

== Panellists ==
The most frequently appearing panellists on Q+A as of 29 September 2020 were:

Name	Affiliation	Appearances
Tanya Plibersek	Labor	35
Christopher Pyne	Liberal	27
Malcolm Turnbull	Liberal	27
Barnaby Joyce	National	22
Bill Shorten	Labor	22
Penny Wong	Labor	21
Greg Sheridan	The Australian	21
Chris Bowen	Labor	20
George Brandis	Liberal	19
Joe Hockey	Liberal	15
Josh Frydenberg	Liberal	15
Anthony Albanese	Labor	15
Tony Burke	Labor	15
Terri Butler	Labor	13
Mark Butler	Labor	13
Judith Sloan	The Australian	13
Janet Albrechtsen	The Australian	13
Germaine Greer	Author	13
Greg Hunt	Liberal	13
Kevin Rudd	Labor	12
Amanda Vanstone	Liberal, ABC Radio National	12
Kelly O'Dwyer	Liberal	12
Graham Richardson	Labor, Sky News Australia	12
Sarah Hanson-Young	Greens	12
Kate Ellis	Labor	12
Tim Wilson	Liberal	12
Craig Emerson	Labor	12
Joel Fitzgibbon	Labor	12
Julie Bishop	Liberal	12
Jacqui Lambie	Jacqui Lambie Network	11
Eric Abetz	Liberal	11
Larissa Waters	Greens	11
Sophie Mirabella	Liberal	11
David Marr	The Guardian Australia	11
Linda Burney	Labor	10
Christine Milne	Greens	10
