= Kitchen Cabinet (TV program) =

Australian interview TV series

- Genre: Cooking show
- Directed by: Stamatia Maroupas; Trent O'Donnell
- Presented by: Annabel Crabb
- Country of origin: Australia
- No. of seasons: 8
- No. of episodes: 53

Production
- Producer: Madeleine Hawcroft
- Cinematography: Susan Lumsdon
- Running time: 30 minutes

Original release
- Network: ABC TV
- Release: 22 February 2012 – 30 June 2016
- Release: 15 August 2023 – present

Kitchen Cabinet is an Australian interview television program that is broadcast on ABC. It is hosted by Annabel Crabb. On the program, Crabb chats with the interview subjects while they prepare a meal together.

== Format ==
The format is an informal interview program with Australian politicians over a meal prepared by both Crabb and her guest, normally in the guest's home. Crabb brings a dessert and the guest provides their choice of main meal. It is in the 30-minute format.

On several occasions, there have been two guests, typically with one being a self-confessed non-cook who brings in a helper. Crabb chats with the guest(s) during the preparation, and the meal while they eat.

Crabb being pescetarian has meant that on some occasions the protein for her has been fish-based. Her food preference has also been a factor in her preparation of the desserts.

The show has received mostly positive reviews.

== Episodes ==
=== Series overview ===
Series	Episodes	Originally released	
Series	Episodes	First released	Last released
1	6	22 February 2012	28 March 2012
2	6	10 October 2012	14 November 2012
3	8	2 July 2013	5 September 2013
4	7	21 October 2014	2 December 2014
5	6	28 October 2015	2 December 2015
6	6	26 May 2016	30 June 2016
7	8	15 August 2023	3 October 2023
8	6	21 July 2026	25 August 2026

=== Season 1 (2012) ===
No. overall	No. in series	Guest(s)	Original release date
1	1	Christopher Pyne and Amanda Vanstone	22 February 2012
2	2	Nigel Scullion	29 February 2012
3	3	Penny Wong	7 March 2012
4	4	Julie Bishop	14 March 2012
5	5	Tanya Plibersek	21 March 2012
6	6	Dick Adams	28 March 2012

=== Season 2 (2012) ===
No. overall	No. in series	Guest	Original release date
7	1	Joe Hockey	10 October 2012
8	2	Bronwyn Bishop	17 October 2012
9	3	Peter Garrett	24 October 2012
10	4	Barnaby Joyce	31 October 2012
11	5	Louise Pratt	7 November 2012
12	6	Christine Milne	14 November 2012

=== Season 3 (2013) ===
No. overall	No. in series	Guest(s)	Original release date
13	1	Malcolm Turnbull	2 July 2013
14	2	Craig Emerson	9 July 2013
15	3	Nick Xenophon	16 July 2013
16	4	Jenny Macklin	23 July 2013
17	5	Sussan Ley and Bill Heffernan	30 July 2013
18	6	Doug Cameron	6 August 2013
19	7	Tony Abbott	4 September 2013
20	8	Kevin Rudd	5 September 2013

=== Season 4 (2014) ===
No. overall	No. in series	Guest(s)	Original release date
21	1	Bob Hawke	21 October 2014
22	2	Andrew Robb and Mary Jo Fisher	28 October 2014
23	3	Bill Shorten	4 November 2014
24	4	Mathias Cormann	11 November 2014
25	5	Anna Burke	9 November 2014
26	6	Warren Entsch	25 November 2014
27	7	Clive Palmer	2 December 2014

=== Season 5 (2015) ===
No. overall	No. in series	Guest(s)	Original release date
28	1	Scott Morrison	28 October 2015
29	2	Anthony Albanese and Christopher Pyne	4 November 2015
30	3	Ricky Muir	11 November 2015
31	4	Nova Peris	18 November 2015
32	5	Richard Di Natale	25 November 2015
33	6	Cory Bernardi	2 December 2015

=== Season 6 (2016) ===
No. overall	No. in series	Guest	Original release date
34	1	Jacqui Lambie	26 May 2016
35	2	Sam Dastyari	2 June 2016
36	3	Scott Ludlam	9 June 2016
37	4	Michaelia Cash	16 June 2016
38	5	Malcolm Turnbull	23 June 2016
39	6	Bill Shorten	30 June 2016

=== Season 7 (2023) ===
No. overall	No. in series	Guest	Original release date
40	1	Dai Le	15 August 2023
41	2	Peter Dutton	22 August 2023
42	3	Linda Burney	29 August 2023
43	4	Lidia Thorpe	5 September 2023
44	5	Karen Andrews	12 September 2023
45	6	Jordon Steele-John	17 September 2023
46	7	Bridget McKenzie	25 September 2023
47	8	Anika Wells	2 October 2023

=== Season 8 (2026) ===
Season 8 commenced on 21 July 2026 and featured Prime Minister Anthony Albanese in the season's opening episode. Opposition Leader Angus Taylor, Independent MP Allegra Spender, Greens Senator Maureen Faruqi and Labor MP Josh Burns are all set to appear in the 2026 season.

No. overall	No. in series	Guest	Original release date
48	1	Anthony Albanese	21 July 2026
49	2	Angus Taylor	28 July 2026
50	3	Allegra Spender	4 August 2026
51	4	Mehreen Faruqi	11 August 2026
52	5	Josh Burns	18 August 2026
53	6	Darren Chester	25 August 2026

== Guests ==
Crabb has said that her most memorable show was with Senator Nigel Scullion, when he took her collecting crustaceans in the coastal mudflats of the Northern Territory.

=== 2013 Federal Election Kitchen Cabinet shows ===
During the 2013 Australian federal election, Crabb taped two shows for Kitchen Cabinet, beyond the previously normal 6 episodes, with the leaders of the major opposing parties, Tony Abbott (Liberal Party of Australia) and Kevin Rudd (Australian Labor Party) with these shows being broadcast on successive nights in the last week of the political campaign, on Wednesday 4 September and Thursday 5 September respectively.

=== 2016 Federal Election Kitchen Cabinet shows ===
During the 2016 Australian federal election, Crabb again taped two shows for Kitchen Cabinet with the leaders of the major opposing parties, Malcolm Turnbull (Liberal Party of Australia) and Bill Shorten (Australian Labor Party)
