= Dark Victory (book) =

2003 book by David Marr and Marian Wilkinson

- Author: David Marr (journalist) and Marian Wilkinson
- Language: English
- Publisher: Allen & Unwin
- Publication date: 2003
- Publication place: Australia

Dark Victory is a 2003 Australian book by David Marr and Marian Wilkinson. The book was released eighteen months into the Howard government's third term, and discusses the border control policy of the John Howard Liberal–National government. Dark Victory consists of 21 chapters, covering the key political events involving the Howard government from 23 August to 10 November 2001. The Tampa affair, the Pacific solution, the Children Overboard affair are discussed.

The book investigates other countries' views of Australia and the role of the Australian Labor Party and One Nation party. Marr and Wilkinson have worked together on previous journalistic investigations at The National Times in the 1980s.

The index compiled by Garry Cousins was highly commended for the 2003 ANZSI John Simkin Medal.

== Reception ==
Dark Victory has been praised for its provocative accounts of immigration policy in Australia following the events of Tampa. It was also shortlisted for the Arts South Australia Festival Awards for Literature in 2004 and Won the Queensland Premier's Literary Awards in 2003. Marr and Wilkinson have also been awarded Human Rights Award in the category of Arts Non-fiction in 2003 for their work on Dark Victory.
