= Marian Wilkinson =

Australian journalist and author

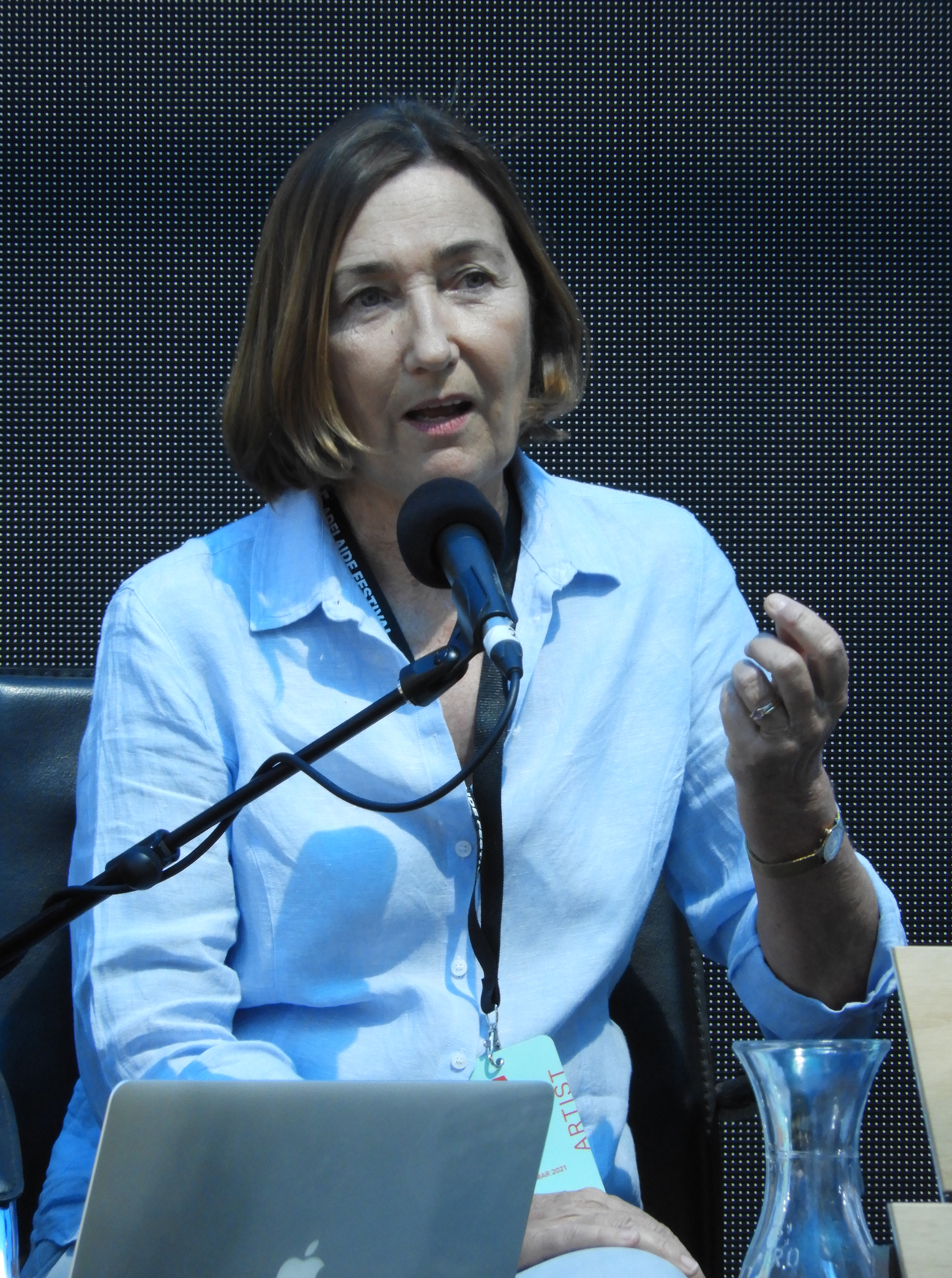
Marian Wilkinson discusses her book "The Carbon Club" at Adelaide Writers' Week 2021

Marian Wilkinson is an Australian journalist and author. She has won two Walkley Awards, and was the first female executive producer of Four Corners. She has been a deputy editor of the Sydney Morning Herald, a Washington correspondent for The National Times, The Age and The Sydney Morning Herald, as well as a senior reporter for The Australian.As of April 2017, she is a senior reporter at Four Corners.

== Early life ==
She was born in 1954 and grew up in Brisbane, Queensland where she attended the University of Queensland. In 1975, she was a cofounder of community radio station 4ZZZ-FM.

"I grew up quite some time ago in Queensland when it was run by what was later found to be an incredibly corrupt government -- the government of Joh Bjelke-Petersen," she told journalism students in 2015. "I think my interest in journalism stemmed from there because I had set up a student radio station, and set up a newsroom. We were actually trying to as young students go and look at things like police corruption, go and look at things like political corruption, which was rife already in the state. I think that desire to actually expose wrong-doing really motivated me."

== Career ==
In the 1980s, Wilkinson joined the staff of the National Times, which was edited by Brian Toohey and saw her work alongside reporters like David Marr, Colleen Ryan and Wendy Bacon. The paper at the time had a heavy investigative focus, particularly with regards to politics and crime. Wilkinson became the National Times' Washington Correspondent, and from there joined the ABC, where she started working on the network's flagship current affairs program. Four Corners.

In 1989, True Believers, a report done with Monica Attard on the dumping of federal Liberal leader John Howard by the Liberal Party in favour of Andrew Peacock, won both a Walkley and a Logie. Later that year, she joined The Sydney Morning Herald, though she rejoined Four Corners less than a year later in the role of executive producer.

In 1995, Wilkinson was a reporter for The Australian. By 2000, she was a senior editor at Fairfax's Sydney Morning Herald. In 2002, she moved back to writing duties, being appointed the Washington correspondent for the paper, also filing for sister title The Age. She returned to Sydney in 2005, becoming the Sydney Morning Herald's national security editor. In 2009, when the paper's environment editor, she won the Eureka Prize for Environmental Journalism for The Tipping Point, a report on the melting of the arctic sea ice.

In 2010, Wilkinson rejoined Four Corners. In 2016, she was nominated for a Walkley Award for her work as the ABC's lead reporter on the Panama Papers. Her 2020 book, The Carbon Club, was longlisted for the 2021 Walkley Book Award.

== Personal life ==
She is the aunt of Cassandra Wilkinson who is a co-founder of FBi FM Sydney.

== Works ==
=== Books ===
- The Book Of Leaks (with Brian Toohey) 1987 ISBN 9780207155086
- The Fixer: the untold story of Graham Richardson 1996 ISBN 9780855616854
- Dark Victory (with David Marr) 2003 ISBN 9781741144475
- The Carbon Club ISBN 9781760875992

=== TV ===
- The Tipping Point report for Four Corners
