= Morry Schwartz =

Australian publisher (born 1948)

Morry Schwartz AM
- מורי שוורץ
- Born: 1948 (age 77–78); Vámospércs, Hungary
- Occupations: Property developer and publisher
- Organization(s): Pan Urban; Schwartz Publishing

Morris Zoltan Schwartz AM (Hebrew: מורי שוורץ; born 1948) is an Australian publisher, formerly a property developer, based in Melbourne. He is the owner of Schwartz Publishing, the publisher of the influential Quarterly Essay, The Monthly, and The Saturday Paper.

== Early life ==
Morry Schwartz was born around 1948 in Vámospércs, Hungary. His parents, Andor and Margaret (Baba) Schwartz, were both Holocaust survivors. Andor’s parents, brother and sister, and extended family were murdered during the Holocaust. Baba herself was a survivor of Auschwitz. He and his parents were smuggled across the border to Germany in 1949 when he was one year old, in order to migrate to the newly established state of Israel, where he spent most of the next nine years. A visit from Baba’s sister, who had also survived the Holocaust and had made her home in Australia, convinced Andor that there were new opportunities on the other side of the world. Morry and his family arrived in Melbourne in 1958, the day before Rosh Hashanah.

After finishing school at the selective Melbourne High, he studied architecture briefly before deciding he didn't have the patience for six years of theory. He dropped out to travel, spending time in Indonesia and Cambodia, before returning to get into the film business.

In 1973, with three friends, Schwartz began a company, Outback Press, the start of his publishing empire. But he also launched a concrete pouring company, Aardvark, which evolved into a property development group, called Pan Urban.

== Book and magazine publishing ==
In the 1980s he established Schwartz Publishing, mainly publishing American self-help books. Its all-time bestseller was Life's Little Instruction Book, with 300,000 copies sold.

In the 1990s Schwartz Publishing set up the Black Inc imprint, publishing since 2001 the Quarterly Essay and, since 2005, The Monthly.

On 1 March 2014 he launched The Saturday Paper, and in 2017 Australian Foreign Affairs, a journal discussing foreign policy.

Schwartz was chairman of the board of Schwartz Media until December 2023, when he resigned the position and said that he would be stepping back from hands-on operations.

== Property development ==
In 1974 Schwartz moved into the construction and property development industry. His company, first named Aardvark, was later renamed Pan Urban. His business barely survived the 1989 property crash.

Schwartz was the major stakeholder of Pan Urban in 2014. Its portfolio included the St Falls, Silverski and Huski hotels in Falls Creek, Victoria, the Watergate towers in Docklands and the refurbishment of the Melbourne General Post Office. Several of their projects were designed by his stepdaughter, architect Zahava Elenberg. As of 2023 the company is no longer registered for GST.

In 2009, he set up a real estate website, listing only houses for sale valued at over $1 million, called thehomepage.com.au. It was owned by start-up company Dog No. 7.

Schwartz exited the property development business in late 2017.
