= Last Drinks: The Impact of the Northern Territory Intervention =

Essay by Paul Toohey

- Author: Paul Toohey
- Genre: Essay
- Publication date: 2008

Last Drinks: The Impact of the Northern Territory Intervention is a 2008 Quarterly Essay by Australian journalist Paul Toohey. Toohey critiques the Australian government's intervention in remote indigenous communities in the Northern Territory, which began in 2007, and aimed to protect indigenous children from a “national emergency” of child sexual abuse. Last Drinks won the 2008 Walkley Award for "Coverage of Indigenous Affairs".
