= The Saturday Paper =

Australian weekly newspaper

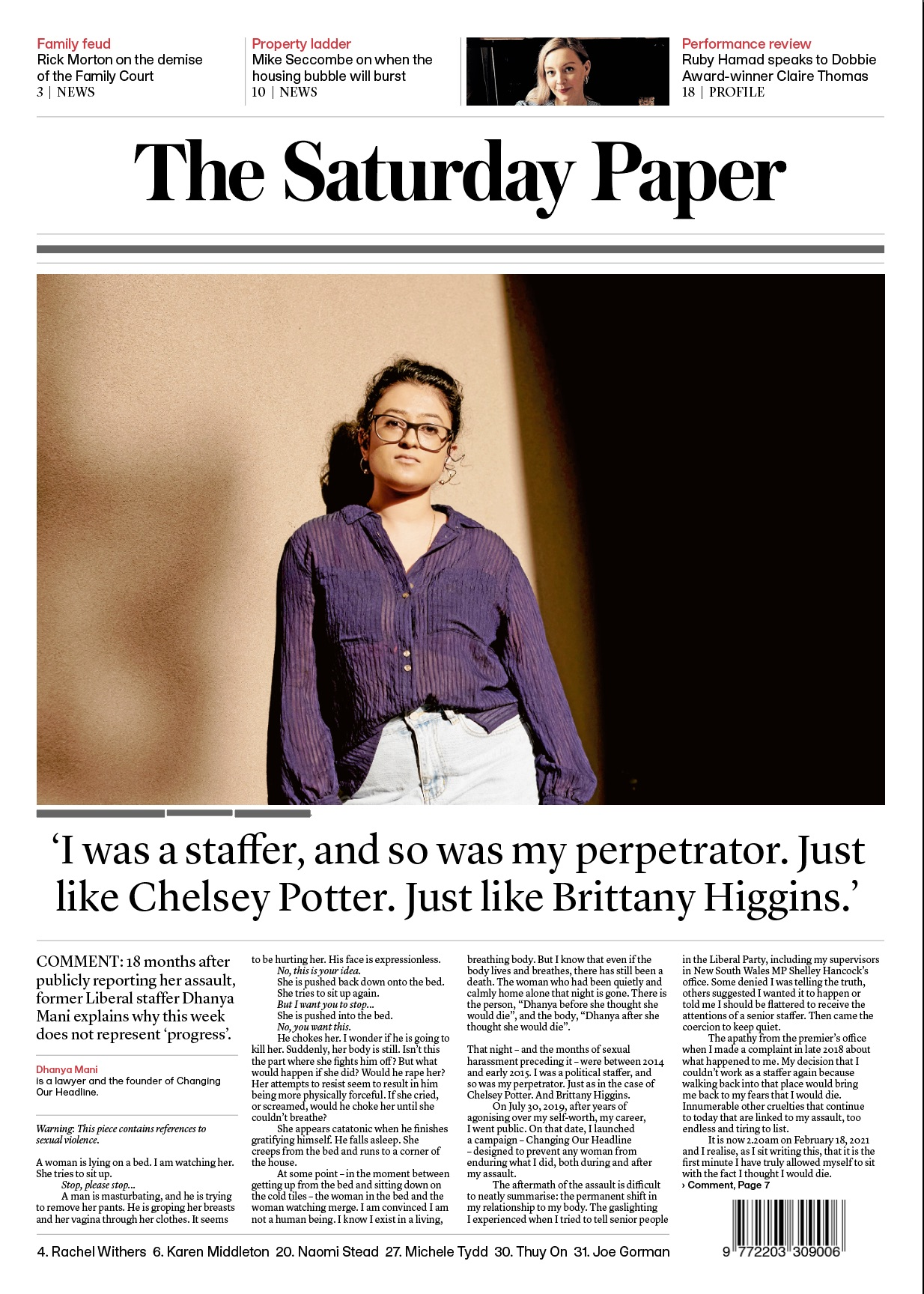
- Front page of The Saturday Paper, Issue #337, February 20, 2021
- Type: Weekly newspaper
- Format: Compact
- Owner: Schwartz Publishing
- Publisher: Morry Schwartz
- Editor-in-chief: Erik Jensen
- Editor: Emily Barrett
- Deputy editor: Cindy MacDonald
- Associate editor: Martin McKenzie-Murray
- Founded: 1 March 2014; 12 years ago
- Language: English
- Headquarters: Collingwood, Melbourne
- Country: Australia
- Circulation: 472,000
- ISSN: 2203-3092
- OCLC number: 1043663027
- Website: Official website

The Saturday Paper is an Australian weekly newspaper, launched on 1 March 2014 in hard copy, as an online newspaper and in mobile news format. The paper is circulated throughout Australian capital cities and major regional centres. Since its launch The Saturday Paper has maintained a focus on long-form journalism and in-depth coverage of current affairs, arts and Australian politics.

== Publication ==
The Saturday Paper is published by Morry Schwartz via Schwartz Media, which also publishes books via Black Inc, the magazine The Monthly and the Quarterly Essay. Upon its launch, Schwartz stated he expected The Saturday Paper to be profitable within several years, and the paper should sell "between 60,000 and 80,000 copies a week". Another early projection put that figure at 80,000 to 100,000 copies a week.

== Editors ==
Author Erik Jensen was the paper's editor from its founding until June 2018, when Vice Media features editor Maddison Connaughton was appointed to the position. Jensen became the paper's editor-in-chief. He was the paper's representative on the judging panel for the annual Horne Prize since its inception in 2016 until it went defunct in 2023. Jensen replaced Connaughton as editor in June 2021 before moving to become editor-in-chief of the newspaper's publisher, Schwartz Media. Since April 2022 The Saturday Paper has been edited by former Bloomberg News editor Emily Barrett.. In November 2024, Jensen also became the CEO of Schwartz Media.

== Contributors ==
Regular contributors include journalists Paul Bongiorno, Karen Barlow, Jason Koutsoukis, John Hewson, Jonathan Pearlman and Martin McKenzie-Murray.

Other frequent contributors include writers John Kinsella, Christos Tsiolkas, Margaret Simons, Elizabeth Farrelly, Marcia Langton, Jane Caro, Behrouz Boochani, Fiona Kelly McGregor, economist Richard Denniss, Kate Holden, James Bradley, Bob Brown, Shaad D'Souza, Andy Hazel and David Marr. In 2020, poet, playwright and novelist Alison Croggon became the paper's arts editor. In March 2024, Stan Grant started producing fortnightly commentary pieces and later that year Oslo Davis replaced longtime cartoonist Jon Kudelka.
