= The Australian Moment =

2012 book by George Megalogenis

The Australian Moment: How We Were Made for These Times
- Author: George Megalogenis
- Language: English
- Subject: Australian politics, Political history, Economics
- Published: 2012 (Penguin Group)
- Publication place: Australian
- Media type: Print (Hardback)
- Pages: 394
- ISBN: 9780670075218
- OCLC: 792914514

The Australian Moment: How We Were Made for These Times is a 2012 Australian economics book by George Megalogenis. It explains how Australia has been able to weather recent world economic problems relatively unscathed.

== Reception ==
Dennis Altman, writing in The Sydney Morning Herald, described The Australian Moment as "a detailed and rather economist account of mainstream politics during the past 40 years.", and although calling Megalogenis "one of the country's sanest political journalists" found that "in the end his views reflect the dominant consensus of the chattering classes: Hawke is the best post-Menzies leader because he led the way in deregulating the economy.", and concluded "The thesis of The Australian Moment is fascinating, but it deserves a far more thought-through argument and one that recognises the equal claims of countries such as Brazil or Turkey that seem more likely than Australia to be seen as global models. .. It is unfortunate that there is not more time for our best journalists to step back, reflect more and write more slowly."

The Australian Moment has also been reviewed by The Spectator, Australian Book Review, Inside Story, and Institute of Public Affairs Review.

== Awards ==
- 2012 Harry Williams Award - winner
- 2012 John Button Prize: for writing on policy and politics - shortlist
- 2012 Walkley Book Award - winner
- 2013 Prime Minister's Literary Award for Non-fiction - winner
- 2014 Adelaide Festival Award for Literature: Non-fiction - shortlist

== Adaptation ==
Making Australia Great: Inside Our Longest Boom is a 2015 3 part documentary by Megalogenis based on The Australian Moment.
