= Life's Little Instruction Book =

1991 book by Horace Jackson Brown Jr.

- Author: Horace Jackson Brown Jr.
- Publisher: (American) Rutledge Hill Press
- Publication date: January 1, 1991
- Pages: 160 (original Vol. 1)
- ISBN: 978-1558531024

Life's Little Instruction Book (first edition: Life's Little Instruction Book: 511 Suggestions, Observations, and Reminders on How to Live a Happy and Rewarding Life) is a 1991 self-help book written by author Horace Jackson Brown Jr. and published by Rutledge Hill Press in the USA, Schwartz Publishing in Australia; this book was originally written as a series of rules to go by for his college-bound son, Adam Brown. This book was originally composed of 511 pieces of advice, and this count ballooned to 1532 with volumes II (1993) and III (1995); for The Complete Life's Little Instruction Book (1997), 28 more pieces of advice were tacked on it. Life's Little Instruction Book was a New York Times Best Seller, notably securing the top spot for the paperback and hardcover editions simultaneously; the book sold seven million copies.
