= Peter McEvoy (journalist) =

Australian journalist and television producer

Peter McEvoy is an Australian journalist and television producer.

McEvoy is perhaps best known as being the creator and executive producer of ABC Television's weekly panel discussion program Q&A.

He is also a former executive producer of Media Watch, Big Ideas and Difference of Opinion. He also worked on Four Corners as a producer from 1998 until 2001.

In 2015, McEvoy received a formal warning from the ABC Board for misconduct for failing to refer a decision for approval prior to allowing former suspected terrorist Zaky Mallah to question a government minister on Q&A.

Prior to his television work, McEvoy was mostly known for his work with ABC Radio National in the 1990s, where he worked as a producer for Late Night Live in 1993, a reporter for Background Briefing in 1994 and executive producer for Radio National Breakfast from 1997 until 1999. He was also an executive producer of news and current affairs at Triple J.

While working at ABC Radio National, McEvoy was awarded the Gold Walkley for his Background Briefing report "Affordable Safety" following the Young plane crash in 1993 which killed seven people.
