= Jess Hill (writer) =

Australian investigative journalist

Jess Hill is an Australian investigative journalist. In 2020, she won the Stella Prize for her non-fiction work See What You Made Me Do: Power, Control and Domestic Abuse.

== Biography ==
Hill started her journalism career as a producer for ABC Radio National. In 2011, she relocated to Cairo, Egypt, to become Middle East correspondent for The Global Mail. She then moved into investigative journalism, working for ABC's Background Briefing programme. In 2014, she began writing about domestic violence.

Her book, See What You Made Me Do: Power, Control and Domestic Abuse, was published in 2019 and won the 2020 Stella Prize for Australian women's writing. A three-part documentary series based on the book and presented by Hill, titled See What You Made Me Do, premiered on SBS Television on 5 May 2021. In 2022, it was announced that Hill would host a second documentary series about consent in Australia titled Asking for It, which also aired on SBS Television premiering in 2023.

In 2020, Hill was the inaugural journalist-in-residence at the University of Technology Sydney (UTS). In 2025, she joined UTS as an Industry Professor, supported by the Wilson Foundation.

== Awards and recognition ==
In 2015, Hill received three of the inaugural Our Watch Awards for her reporting on domestic violence, including the Our Watch Gold Award, the Best Series or Special Award (for her series on family violence, broadcast on ABC Radio National) and the Best Longform Award (for Home Truths: The costs and causes of domestic violence, published in The Monthly).

In 2016, Hill received two Walkley Awards — one for Women's Leadership in Media, and one for a piece of feature writing on the Family Court of Australia, Suffer the Children: Trouble in the Family Court. This piece of writing also earned Hill an Amnesty International Australia Media Award.

In addition to winning the Stella Prize, See What You Made Me Do was a finalist for both the 2019 Walkley Book Award and 2019 Australian Human Rights Commission Media Award, and shortlisted for the 2020 Victorian Premier's Literary Award for Non-fiction. It was also shortlisted for the 2020 Davitt Award for best nonfiction crime book. In 2023 she was named Marie Claire Changemaker of the Year and in 2024, the NSW Premier’s Woman of Excellence.
