= Shaun Brown (business) =

New Zealand media executive

Managing Director of the Special Broadcasting Service
- In office 14 February 2006-2011

Head of Television at Special Broadcasting Service
- In office January 2003 – 14 February 2006

Head of Television New Zealand
- In office 2001–2002

Head of TV One
- In office 1997–2001

Managing Editor of Television New Zealand
- In office 1994–1997

Shaun Brown is the former managing director of the Special Broadcasting Service (SBS) in Australia from 2006 to 2011.

== Career ==
Brown began his broadcasting career with the Australian Broadcasting Commission (ABC) in Perth in 1970. Among his reporting assignments was, in 1973, coverage of French nuclear testing at Muroroa Atoll from on board the frigate HMNZS Otago, for which he was awarded the New Zealand Special Service Medal in 2002. He also received industry recognition for his work as an investigative current affairs reporter and a producer of election night programmes.

=== TVNZ ===
In 1994, Television New Zealand (TVNZ) appointed Brown Managing Editor, News and Current Affairs. He was made Head of TV One in 1997. In 2001, he was appointed Head of Television on an annual salary reported to be $340,000, responsible for running both TVNZ channels. Brown held this TVNZ position for nine months before the position was eliminated by chief executive Ian Fraser.

During his time at TVNZ, the network was accused by New Zealand Prime Minister Helen Clark of being "shamelessly ratings driven" according to a report.

His position as Head of Television at TVNZ ended in 2002. This followed the Hawkesby affair. Hawkesby was hired from TV3 by TVNZ to read the news, replacing Richard Long, but was later sacked. Hawkesby was subsequently awarded a record-breaking $6 million by an arbitrator.

=== SBS ===
Brown joined SBS as Head of Television in January 2003.

He was appointed managing director of SBS on 14 February 2006 for four years. At SBS Brown lifted investment in commissioned programmes from around $4 million in 2002 to around $30 million in 2009. During the same period SBS audience share increased by 22 per cent to a total share of 6.2 per cent.

Brown was at the helm of SBS during some controversial times, including the 2006 decision by the SBS Board to introduce advertising within television programming, as opposed to in-between programming. While Brown admitted that SBS audiences reacted strongly to the introduction of in-programme breaks, after their introduction SBS increased its audience share to record levels, and increased the revenue raised through television advertising to $46.3 million in 2007–08.

In 2008, the SBS Board extended his contract until July 2011. During his time at SBS, the broadcaster's ratings share rose to 6.2 per cent and Australian production increased.

Brown was a delegate to Prime Minister Kevin Rudd's 2008 2020 Summit.

In 2009, Brown likened the cash-strapped broadcaster to Dickensian character Oliver Twist who kept asking the Australian Government for more funding.

After Brown had announced his retirement, Michael Ebeid, former Australian Broadcasting Corporation head of strategy and marketing, was appointed as the new CEO and managing director of SBS, commencing on 13 June 2011.
