= David Marr (journalist) =

Australian journalist

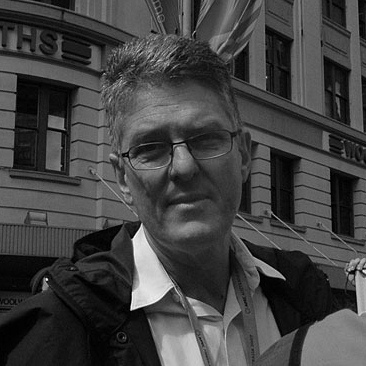
- Marr in 2007
- Born: David Ewan Marr; 13 July 1947 (age 79); Sydney, Australia
- Education: University of Sydney (BA, LLB)
- Occupations: Author; journalist; commentator
- Partner: Sebastian Tesoriero

David Ewan Marr FAHA (born 13 July 1947) is an Australian journalist, author, and political and social commentator. He writes about the law, Australian politics, censorship, the media, and the arts. He has written for The Monthly and Guardian Australia. Marr hosts Late Night Live on ABC's Radio National.

== Early life and education ==
David Ewan Marr was born on 13 July 1947. He attended Sydney Church of England Grammar School in Sydney's Lower North Shore and subsequently graduated from the University of Sydney with a Bachelor of Arts in 1968 and a Bachelor of Laws in 1971. While at university he was a resident of St Paul's College.

== Career ==
Marr worked for a time as an articled clerk at the law firm Allen, Allen and Hemsley, and was admitted as a barrister and solicitor before turning to journalism.

He began as a journalist working for The Bulletin magazine and The National Times newspaper in 1972 before being appointed editor in 1980. During this period, he oversaw publication of the articles by Sydney journalist and author David Hickie, which detailed long-suppressed allegations of corruption against former New South Wales premier Robert Askin. The first article, headlined "Askin: friend of organised crime", was famously published on the day of Askin's funeral in 1981. In 1980 Marr published his first book, Barwick, a biography of Chief Justice Sir Garfield Barwick. It won the NSW Premier's Literary Award for Non-Fiction, but was received poorly by its subject, who accused the author of fabricating quotes. This was followed in 1991 by his biography of Nobel Laureate Patrick White.

Marr was a reporter on the ABC TV program Four Corners (1985, 1990–91), a role in which he won a Walkley Award, and presenter of Radio National's Arts Today program (1994–1996). From 2002 to 2004, he hosted the ABC TV program Media Watch. He was a frequent guest on ABC TV's Insiders program. During his term as presenter of Media Watch he played a key role in exposing the ongoing cash for comment affair, which Media Watch had first raised in 1999, concerning radio commentators Alan Jones and John Laws. In 2004 the program's exposé of Australian Broadcasting Authority (ABA) head David Flint – who had written letters of support to Jones at a time when Jones was being investigated by the ABA – played a significant role in forcing Flint's resignation.

In 2002 Marr stated on Media Watch that conservative newspaper columnist Janet Albrechtsen had misquoted a French psychiatrist, Jean-Jacques Rassial, and claimed that she had done this deliberately to make it look as though violence and gang rape were institutionalised elements of the culture of Muslim youths. Albrechtsen did not deny the misquote, but responded by accusing Media Watch of inherent left-wing bias and of deliberately leading a witch-hunt against contrary views. When the Minister for Communications, Senator Helen Coonan, appointed Albrechtsen to the board of the ABC in February 2005, Marr publicly questioned whether she was qualified for such a position in light of what he described as "breaches of proper conduct as a commentator and as a journalist".

In 2008 Marr was named by Same Same as one of the 25 most influential gay and lesbian Australians for his coverage of the Bill Henson case.

Marr has advocated drug-law reform and has written candidly about his life experiences: "I've had a lot of fun on drugs ... I've had a lot of marvellous experiences. I've danced a lot. I've had a great time. I'm not ashamed of it. And I don't see what's wrong with it."

Marr resigned from The Sydney Morning Herald on 13 July 2012, saying "People underestimate what a deeply conventional person I am. I'm turning 65 and that feels like the right time to go." But in April 2013 Marr joined Guardian Australia.

In 2013 Marr penned the essay (later expanded to a book) The Prince: Faith, Abuse and George Pell about Cardinal Pell's dealing with sexual abuse in the Catholic Church.

In 2020 he appeared in episode 3 of ABC's series Revelation.

He appeared as a semi-regular panellist on the ABC television programs Q&A and Insiders until 2020.

In May 2024 it was announced that Marr would replace Phillip Adams as host of ABC Radio National's Late Night Live after Adams’ last show, on 27 June 2024.

== Awards and honours ==
=== Literary ===
- 1985, 1991, and 2004 (jointly), Walkley Awards
- 2006: Alfred Deakin Prize for an Essay Advancing Public Debate in Victorian Premier's Literary Awards, for "Is the Media Asleep?", from Do Not Disturb: Is the Media Failing Australia?
- 2009: PEN Keneally Award
- 2009: Shortlisted, Alfred Deakin Prize for an Essay Advancing Public Debate, for The Henson Case in the Victorian Premier's Awards
- 2009: Shortlisted, Non-Fiction Prize in the Prime Minister's Literary Awards
- 2010: Walkley Award, for his Quarterly Essay "Power Trip: The Political Journey of Kevin Rudd"
- 2012: Liberty Victoria Voltaire Award
- 2024: Shortlisted, Victorian Premier's Prize for Nonfiction, for Killing for Country: A Family Story
- 2024: Shortlisted, Prime Minister's Literary Award for Australian History, for Killing for Country: A Family Story
- 2024: Shortlisted, Australian Political Book of the Year Award, for Killing for Country: A Family Story

=== Honours ===
- 2011: Honorary Doctor of Letters, University of Newcastle
- 2013: Honorary Doctor of Letters, University of Sydney
- 2013: Honorary Fellow, Australian Academy of the Humanities

== Personal life ==
Marr lives with his partner Sebastian Tesoriero.

== Selected works ==
=== Biographies and nonfiction ===
- 1980 Barwick, Allen & Unwin, ISBN 9781863732697
- 1984 The Ivanov Trail, Nelson, ISBN 9780170064057
- 1991 Patrick White : A Life, Vintage Classics, ISBN 9781741667578
- 2000 The High Price of Heaven
- 2004 Dark Victory (with Marian Wilkinson), ISBN 9780143002581
- 2008 The Henson Case, The Text Publishing Company, ISBN 9781921520037
- 2023 Killing for Country: A Family Story. Black Inc. 3 October 2023. ISBN 9781760642730.

=== Essay collections ===
- 2011 Panic, Black Inc, ISBN 9781863955515
- 2018 My Country: Stories, Essays & Speeches, Black Inc, Hardback ISBN 9781760640804

=== Contributions ===
- 2000 Moore, David (3 February 2024). Fifty Photographs. Introduction by David Marr. Sydney: Chapter & Verse. ISBN 9780947322151.
- 2007 His Master's Voice: The Corruption of Public Debate Under Howard in the Quarterly Essay, Issue 26, ISBN 9781863954051
- 2010 "Power Trip: The Political Journey of Kevin Rudd", in the Quarterly Essay, Issue 38
- 2012 Political Animal: The Making of Tony Abbott, in the Quarterly Essay, Issue 47, ISBN 9781921870941
- 2013 The Prince: Faith, Abuse and George Pell, in the Quarterly Essay, Issue 51, ISBN 9781863954051
- 2015 Faction Man: Bill Shorten's Path to Power, in the Quarterly Essay, Issue 59.
- 2017 The White Queen: One Nation and the Politics of Race, in the Quarterly Essay, Issue 65.

Media offices
Preceded by Paul Barry	Presenter of Media Watch; 2001–2005	Succeeded by Liz Jackson
