= Faultlines (Megalogenis book) =

Faultlines Race, Work, and the Politics of Changing Australia
- Author: George Megalogenis
- Language: English
- Genre: Autobiography
- Publisher: Scribe Publications
- Publication date: 2003
- Publication place: Australia
- Media type: Print
- ISBN: 978-1-920769-05-5
- OCLC: 54690702

Faultlines: Race, Work, and the Politics of Changing Australia is a book by journalist George Megalogenis, senior feature writer for The Australian newspaper.

== Contents ==
Megalogenis divides Australia into "old Australia" and "new Australia", attributing many of Australia's cultural problems to this division.

Megalogenis defines the new part of Australia as women who were the daughters of baby boomers, and who have benefited from the new economy. The majority of Australian workers are now female. Furthermore, this generation of women are the children of post-war immigrants, who are also a prosperous demographic. Statistics show that the children of immigrants do considerably better than the children of white, Australian-born citizens.

Old Australia is old white Australia. Their children are not performing well at school, and they themselves are not performing well in the new deregulated economy.

These are the faultlines referred to in the title of the book, and are at the root of Australia's current cultural clashes, between the so-called Hansonites and the so-called inner-city elites. Megalogenis believes the new Australia, a generation that is pro-republic, pro-reconciliation and in favour of a softer policy on refugees, will shape the future of the country.
