= Zaky Mallah =

Australian convicted of terrorism (born 1983)

- Born: 11 August 1983 (age 43)
- Known for: First individual charged under Australia's anti-terrorism laws

Zaky Mallah is an Australian who was the first to be charged with terror offences under Australia's anti-terrorism act after he made a video which allegedly contained a threat to carry out a suicide attack on federal government offices in Sydney in 2003. He was acquitted of two terrorism charges in 2005, but pleaded guilty to a third charge of threatening violence against Commonwealth officials.

In 2011 Mallah travelled to Syria to film the Syrian Civil War, declaring himself in support of the Free Syrian Army. In 2015 he was controversially allowed to ask a question on the ABC program Q&A, leading then Prime Minister of Australia Tony Abbott to question "Which side is the ABC on?"

== First Australian charged under its anti-terrorism act ==
In 2003, when he was nineteen, Mallah was the first to be arrested under then-recently enacted amendments to Australia's federal Criminal Code Act which introduced specific offences for terrorism-related acts. Mallah spent two years in Goulburn Correctional Centre subject to solitary confinement and a 22-hour lockdown while he awaited trial.

The circumstances of the case were that after being refused a passport, Mallah appealed through a lawyer to the Administrative Appeals Tribunal. Both Mallah and his lawyer were barred from viewing the evidence supporting the passport refusal, which was upheld. Mallah then purchased a rifle and ammunition, prepared his will and made a video to be played after he died. Mallah bragged about this and his claims were eventually brought up on the Alan Jones radio program. The Australian newspaper then paid him $500 for an interview. The Counter Terrorist Command, also aware of the threats, sent an undercover officer posing as a freelance journalist to do another interview. This undercover officer offered Mallah $5,000 if he would hold everyone hostage at ASIO headquarters and give the "journalist" the scoop.

Entrapment of a suspect in Australia is legal if the police obtain a "controlled operations authority certificate". However, the police did not get a certificate so the entrapment was illegal. At his trial Justice James Wood allowed the entrapment into evidence. Wood criticised the media for accepting claims as credible and giving them undue prominence in newspapers.

At his trial, the jury found Mallah not guilty of two counts of "committing an act in preparation for or in the planning of a terrorist act, contrary to s.101.6(1)". Justice Wood stated that "the prisoner was an idiosyncratic, and embittered young man, who was to all intents something of a loner, without significant prospects of advancing himself. While I accept that the prisoner enjoyed posing as a potential martyr, and may from time to time, in his own imagination, have contemplated creating a siege and taking the lives of others, I am satisfied that in his more rational moments he lacked any genuine intention of doing so."

Mallah was also charged with "making a threat to cause serious harm to a third party: (s.147.2)", referring to the verbal threats made to the undercover officer. He was sentenced to two and a half years jail.

In September 2005, his jail term was extended by six weeks for assaulting a prison officer.

== Dismissal from Stadium Australia ==
In 2011 Mallah was employed by Stadium Australia until he was fired for broadcasting a video of non-public areas of the stadium on YouTube. The videos included a shot of a private dining room for VIPs, and a shot of the kitchen where he worked. Stadium Australia officials stated that the broadcast breached his employment conditions. Mallah asserted that his firing was triggered by his employers learning that he had once been charged under the anti-terrorism act.

== Observing the Syrian civil war ==
In 2011, following uprisings that were part of the Arab Spring, Mallah travelled to Syria during the Syrian civil war. Mallah has asserted that he and all the other Australians he met in Syria were filling non-combat roles, which would not violate Australian law.

While in Syria, Mallah uploaded videos he made to Facebook, some of which were republished by mainstream Australian news sources.

The Australian published a profile of Mallah, where he described himself as engaging in a "Jihad of Peace". They quoted Mallah describing how seeing his guide shot by a sniper filled him with a new appreciation for the freedoms found in Australian society.

Mallah says he does not support ISIS, that he "hates ISIS" and supported the Free Syrian Army.

== Return to Australia ==
In December 2012, after returning from Syria, The Australian reported Mallah claimed he had received death threats from individuals who doubted his truthfulness, and suspected he was a covert employee of Australian security agencies.

In January 2013, Mallah was a member of a panel interviewed by ABC journalist Stephanie Smail. According to Smail, Mallah started the Free Syria Army Australia group.

In May 2013 Mallah published a guideline for other Australians considering volunteering to help Muslims in war zones on how they could do so, without violating provisions in the anti-terrorism act that barred Australians from fighting in foreign wars. According to the News.com.au, Mallah's analysis was that various kinds of non-violent assistance in war zones would not violate Australian law. Mallah asserted treating wounded fighters would not violate Australian law; neither would preparing or serving rations, or carrying flags. Mallah claimed that individuals killed while aiding fighters would be martyrs entitled to the same after-life benefits an actual fighter is promised. His guideline also included advice for volunteers who wanted to avoid risking their own lives.

Zee News reported on 18 May 2013 that Mallah had been charged under the anti-terrorism act a second time for broadcasting the video.

== Appearance on ABC Q&A ==
Mallah appeared on Q&A on 22 June 2015, putting a pre-approved question to LNP member Steven Ciobo. Prime Minister Tony Abbott strongly criticised the ABC for "giving Mallah a platform" saying that "heads should roll". He asked "Which side is the ABC on?" and said that the ABC "betrayed" Australia.

Mallah went on to debate Waleed Aly on The Project and published an opinion piece in The Guardian's Comment is free. Mallah argued that young Muslims in Australia feel vilified by a government "looking for votes" and that the citizenship proposal is a "very dangerous step" that moves Australia towards "an authoritarian system". Mallah argued that "ASIO and counter-terrorism police" benefit from community relations, and that the government should listen to people like him because he had "been to Syria" and understands the world view of young people considering leaving.

== Flag design ==
Mallah designed a new flag for Australia in 2015 which he named AusRoo.

== Denied entry to Singapore ==
On 7 June 2018, Mallah was denied entry to Singapore. Officials detained him at the airport. Mallah was able to contact an Australian reporter before Singapore officials took away his phone, prior to questioning him. He later reported they questioned him for five hours, before sending him back to Australia.
