= H. Jackson Brown Jr. =

American author (1940–2021)

- Born: Horace Jackson Brown Jr. March 14, 1940; Nashville, Tennessee, U.S.
- Died: November 30, 2021 (aged 81); Nashville, Tennessee, U.S.
- Alma mater: Emory University
- Occupation: Author
- Writing career
- Notable work: Life's Little Instruction Book

Horace Jackson Brown Jr. (March 14, 1940 – November 30, 2021) was an American author who was best known for his inspirational book, Life's Little Instruction Book, which was a New York Times Best Seller (1991–1994). Its sequel Life's Little Instruction Book: Volume 2 also made it to the best seller list in 1993.

== Life and career ==
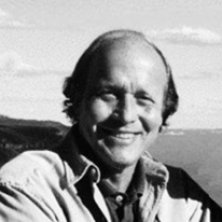
"Twenty years from now you will be more disappointed by the things that you didn't do than by the ones you did do. So throw off the bowlines. Sail away from the safe harbour. Catch the trade winds in your sails. Explore. Dream. Discover." — Horace Jackson Brown Jr.

Brown was born in Nashville, Tennessee on March 14, 1940. Before becoming a writer, he acted as a creative director of an advertising agency in Nashville. He graduated from Emory University in 1962 and was a member of Sigma Chi fraternity. In 1991 he was honored as a "Significant Sig", an award given by the organization to its notable members.

Brown first published A Father's Book of Wisdom, which was quickly followed by P.S. I Love You, a collection of sayings and observations by his father and mother, respectively. The latter contains a famous quote ending with "Explore. Dream. Discover," which is often misattributed to Mark Twain.

Both books were very popular and led to Life's Little Instruction Book, which was originally written as a going-away present for his college-bound son, Adam. This book contained 511 reminders about "how to live a happy and rewarding life" and became a best-seller worldwide. It has logged more than two years on the New York Times Best Seller list, including more than a year at the number one spot. Life's Little Instruction Book was the first book to occupy the number one spot on the New York Times Best Seller list in both paperback and hardback formats simultaneously. Live and Learn and Pass It On followed and also became a New York Times Best Seller. It was co-authored with his ex-wife Rosemary C. Brown, who is herself an author of books inckuding Rosemary Brown's Big Kitchen Instruction Book.

Brown's books have been translated into 35 languages. They have spawned calendars, posters, apparel items, daily journals, greeting cards, audiocassettes, screensavers and fortune cookies.

He died on November 30, 2021, at the age of 81 at his residence in Nashville.

== Works ==
- A Father's Book of Wisdom. Thomas Nelson Inc, 1988. ISBN 1-55853-107-6.
- P.S. I love you. Rutledge Hill Press, 1990. ISBN 1-55853-071-1.
- Life's little instruction book, (Volume 1). Rutledge Hill Press, 1991. ISBN 1-55853-102-5.
- Life's Little Instruction Book (Volume 2): A Few More Suggestions, Observations, and Remarks on How to Live a Happy and Rewarding Life. Thomas Nelson Inc, 1994. ISBN 1-55853-275-7.
- The Little Book of Christmas Joys. with Rosemary Brown, Kathy Peel. Thomas Nelson Inc., 1994. ISBN 1-55853-311-7.
- Wit and Wisdom from the Peanut Butter Gang. Rutledge Hill Press, 1994. ISBN 1-55853-276-5.
- Complete Life's Little Instruction Book. Thomas Nelson Incorporated, 1997. ISBN 1-55853-495-4.
- Kid's Little Treasure Books on What I've Learned...So Far. Thomas Nelson(J), 1997. ISBN 1-55853-555-1.
- Life's Treasure Book of Christmas Memories. with G. G. Santiago. Thomas Nelson Inc, 1999. ISBN 1-55853-804-6.
- Life's Little Treasure Book on Things That Really Matter. Thomas Nelson Inc., 1999. ISBN 1-55853-747-3
- Life's Little Treasure Book on Simple Pleasures. Thomas Nelson Inc, 1999. ISBN 1-55853-746-5.
- Live and Learn and Pass It On (Vol. 2): People Ages 5 to 95 Share What They've Discovered about Life, Love, and Other Good Stuff. Thomas Nelson Publishers, 2000. ISBN 1-55853-839-9.
- Life's Instructions for Wisdom, Success, and Happiness. Thomas Nelson Inc, 2000. ISBN 1-4016-0235-5.
- Life's Little Instruction Book, Volume 3. Thomas Nelson Inc, 2000. ISBN 1-55853-837-2.
- Life's Little Instruction Book from Mothers to Daughters. with Kim Shea. Thomas Nelson Inc, 2000. ISBN 1-55853-832-1.
- Life's Treasure Book on Friendship. Thomas Nelson Inc, 2000. ISBN 1-55853-802-X.
- Life's Little Instructions from the Bible Perpetua, with Rosemary C. Brown. Andrews McMeel Publishing, 2001. ISBN 0-7407-1694-8.
- A Book of Love for My Son. with Hy Brett. Thomas Nelson Inc, 2001. ISBN 1-55853-865-8.
- A Book of Love for My Daughter. with Paula Flautt, Kim Shea. Thomas Nelson Inc, 2001. ISBN 1-55853-866-6.
- Highlighted in yellow: a short course in living wisely and choosing well. with Rochelle Pennington. Rutledge Hill Press, 2001. ISBN 1-55853-834-8.
- The Complete Live and Learn and Pass It on. Thomas Nelson Inc, 2007. ISBN 1-4016-0331-9.
- As Southern As It Gets: 1,071 Reasons to Never Leave the South. Thomas Nelson, 2017. ISBN 9780718098100.
