= Schwartz Publishing =

Australian publishing house, digital media and news media organisation

Schwartz Publishing (Schwartz Media)
- Founded: 1974
- Founder: Morry Schwartz
- Country of origin: Australia
- Headquarters location: Melbourne, Victoria, Australia
- Publication types: Books, magazines, newspapers, journals, digital media
- Imprints: Black Inc, La Trobe University Press, Nero, Quarterly Essay Journal, Australian Foreign Affairs Journal, Writers on Writers
- No. of employees: 50–200
- Official website: schwartzpublishing.com.au

Schwartz Publishing is an Australian publishing house, digital media, and news media organisation based in Melbourne, established by Australian property developer Morry Schwartz in the 1980s. Since the late 1990s many of its publications have appeared under the Black Inc imprint. Schwartz Publishing has its complementary brand Schwartz Media, which all sit under the wider group of Schwartz companies, specialising in newspapers, books, essays, magazines, journals, podcasts, and online news media. Its most well-known publications are Quarterly Essay, The Saturday Paper, and The Monthly.

== History ==
In the 1980s Schwartz Publishing, founded by Morry Schwartz, mainly published American self-help and counterculture books. Its all-time bestseller was Life's Little Instruction Book by H. Jackson Brown Jr. with 300,000 copies sold.

In the 1990s Schwartz Publishing set up the Black Inc imprint, publishing since 2001 the Quarterly Essay and since 2005 The Monthly.

In 2017, Black Inc. Books alongside La Trobe University launched a joint publishing imprint, La Trobe University Press (LTUP).

== The Monthly ==
The Monthly, a magazine focused on politics and culture, launched in 2005. Its contributor list includes Helen Garner, Richard Flanagan, David Marr, Don Watson, Chloe Hooper, Tim Winton, Christos Tsiolkas, Noel Pearson, Anne Manne, Robert Manne, Karen Hitchcock, Anwen Crawford, Anna Goldsworthy, and J.M. Coetzee. In 2020, The Monthly had 100,000 print readership and 220,000 web and app readership. The Monthly reported a 40% increase in subscriptions between March 2020 and March 2021.

As of May 2022 the editor of The Monthly is Michael Williams.

== The Saturday Paper ==
In 2014, Schwartz Media began publishing The Saturday Paper, with the aim to "challenge orthodoxy...question authority and provoke debate." The newspaper was launched on 1 March 2014 in Sydney, Melbourne, and Canberra. The publication of The Saturday Paper came at a time when newspapers were experiencing major write-downs.

In the 12 months leading up to September 2019, The Saturday Paper's readership results were released, showing that new paper had successfully grown by 8.2% with now a circulation of 250,000, despite the overall news media industry declining by 3.7%.

According to data from Roy Morgan, The Saturday Paper nearly doubled its readership during the COVID-19 pandemic, with figures reported from 119,000 in March 2020 growing to 224,000 in March 2021.

== Podcasts and new media ==
=== 7am ===
In May 2019, Schwartz Media announced the launch of 7am, a daily news podcast. 7am is hosted by Ruby Jones and with editor Osman Faruqi and is available every weekday morning.

In May 2020, 7am announced it would be partnering with Acast, the world's largest podcast company, for the distribution of its growing listener base, with it now being available on all the major podcasting platforms, being Apple Podcasts, Spotify, and Google Podcasts, as well as other smaller platforms such as Acast, Castbox, Overcast, Pocket Casts, Podbean and Stitcher.

Following this announcement, Schwartz Media also celebrated a new audience listenership milestone, with an average of 45,000 Australian listens each day, or almost a quarter of a million listens weekly, placing it in the top five Australian podcasts. Schwartz Media has subsequently launched two more podcasts, The Saturday Quiz, hosted by Australian actor John Leary, and The AFA Podcast, hosted by Jonathan Pearlman, the editor of the Australian Foreign Affairs Journal.

Since 2024, Schwartz Media has been partnering with Nova Entertainment for distribution and commercial sales of its podcasts.

In 2025, 7am was sold to Solstice Media, to take effect on 1 July.

=== The Culture ===
Building on the success of its flagship daily news podcast 7am, and its growing arts and culture coverage, Schwartz Media launched The Culture in May 2021, hosted by Osman Faruqi. Episodes are released every Friday, covering film, music, TV, streaming, books, and art.

== Governance and people ==
Schwartz was chairman of the board until December 2023, when he resigned the position and said that he would be stepping back from hands-on operations.

The former CEO of Schwartz Media, Rebecca Costello, resigned in September 2023, to become managing director of Guardian Australia. A new CEO is to be appointed in 2024.

In June 2018, Erik Jensen, formerly editor of The Saturday Paper, became editor-in-chief of Schwartz Media and The Saturday Paper. In June 2021, Jensen returned to the role of editor of The Saturday Paper, a position he had previously held from 2014 to 2018. As of December 2023 he is still in this position.

In March 2014, Nick Feik was appointed editor of The Monthly.

Maddison Connaughton was appointed editor of The Saturday Paper in July 2018, a role she held until June 2021.

Pascall Prize-winning critic Alison Croggon was appointed arts editor of The Saturday Paper in August 2020.

In April 2021, Osman Faruqi was appointed inaugural head of audio at Schwartz Media, overseeing the growth of the company’s podcast offering.

== Public trust ==
According to a Roy Morgan Media Net Trust Survey in April 2019, Schwartz Media was one of the most trusted media sources in Australia, being the most trusted non-broadcast media outlet, and placing third in overall media outlets just behind SBS and the ABC.
