= Annabel Crabb =

Australian journalist and commentator

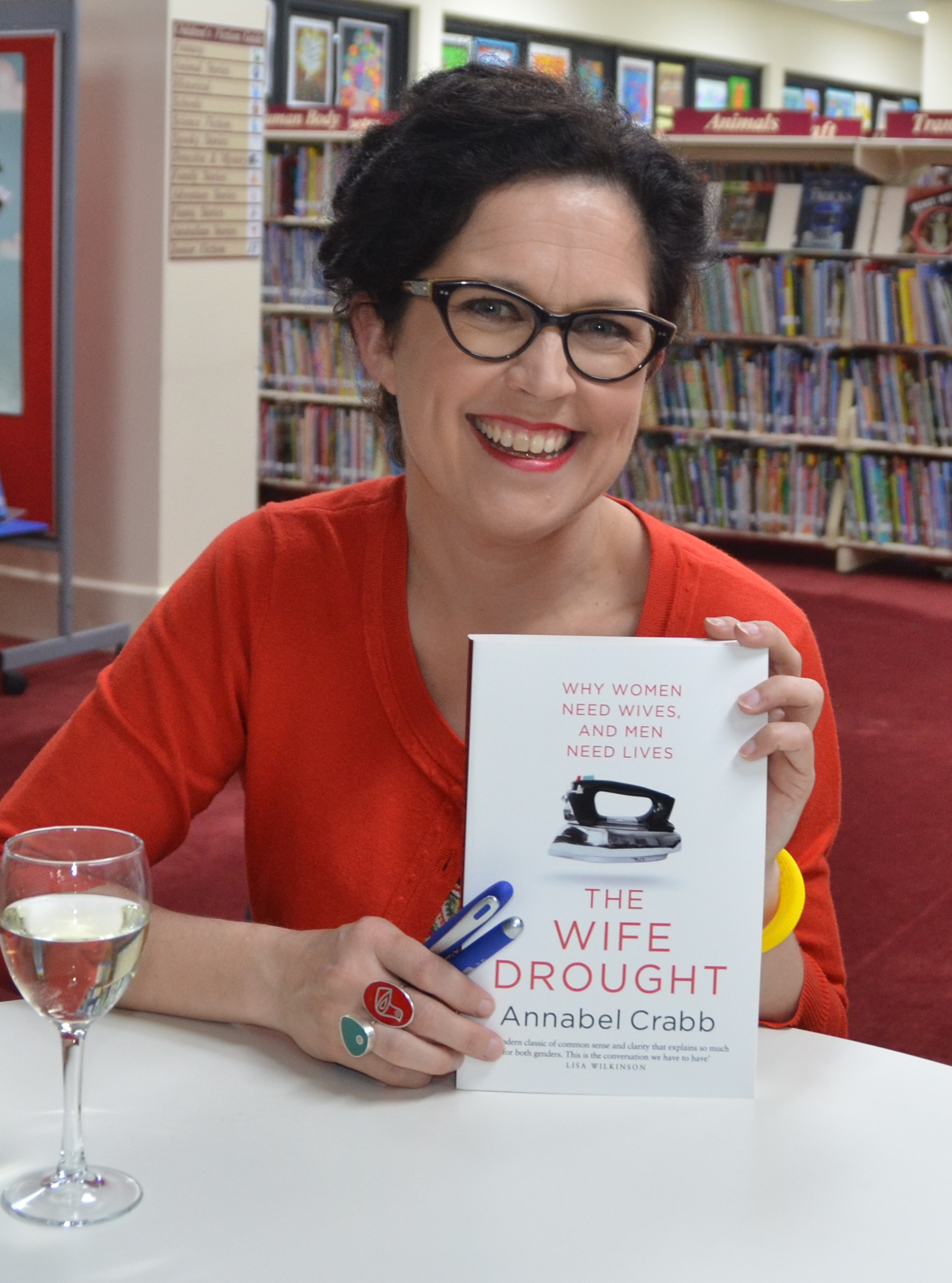
- Crabb promoting The Wife Drought, October 2014
- Born: Adelaide, South Australia, Australia
- Occupations: Political journalist, commentator, television host
- Years active: 1997–present
- Spouse: Jeremy Storer
- Children: 3
- Relatives: Tim Storer (brother-in-law)

Annabel Crabb is an Australian political journalist, commentator and television host who is the ABC's chief online political writer. She has worked for Adelaide's The Advertiser, The Sydney Morning Herald, The Age, the Sunday Age and The Sun-Herald, and won a Walkley Award in 2009 for her Quarterly Essay, "Stop at Nothing: The Life and Adventures of Malcolm Turnbull". She has written two books covering events within the Australian Labor Party, as well as The Wife Drought, a book about women's work–life balance. She has hosted ABC television shows Kitchen Cabinet, The House, Back in Time for Dinner and Tomorrow Tonight.

== Early life and education ==
Annabel Crabb was born in Adelaide to Christobel and Mac Crabb, and grew up on a small farm near Two Wells, South Australia.

She completed high school at Wilderness School in Medindie, South Australia, then studied at the University of Adelaide, graduating in 1997 with arts and law degrees. She was briefly involved in student politics, holding the position of women's officer at the university's student association.

== Career ==
=== Journalism ===
Crabb undertook a cadetship at The Advertiser in 1997. She moved to The Advertiser's Canberra bureau two years later, having worked for The Advertiser in both state and federal politics, before departing in 2000 to move to The Age as a political columnist and correspondent. Three years later she travelled to the United Kingdom and spent several years there working as the London correspondent for the Sunday Age and Sun-Herald and acting as an occasional and largely non-political correspondent for The Sydney Morning Herald. During this time she wrote her first book, Losing It: The Inside Story of the Labor Party in Opposition.

Crabb returned to Australia in 2007 and started work as a senior writer and political columnist for The Sydney Morning Herald and her opinion pieces featured in a regular column in the publication. During this time, Crabb served as a commentator for the ABC's coverage of the 2007 Australian federal election.

Crabb took up a position with the Australian Broadcasting Corporation in November 2009, working as its chief online political writer. She is also one of the presenters of The Drum.

In September 2014, Crabb's book The Wife Drought was published, contributing to the debate about work-life balance for women.

In 2017, in a footnote to readers of her Sydney Morning Herald column, Crabb implied that she had resigned from her role at that newspaper.

=== Television ===
From mid-2012, Crabb and radio personality Merrick Watts appeared in the ABC1 light-entertainment television program Randling, as part of a team called the West Coast Odd Sox.

Crabb has been a regular panellist on the ABC Television political show Insiders, a guest on panel shows such as Network Ten's Good News Week and the ABC's Q&A. She was a panellist on the 2010 ABC federal election series Gruen Nation. She returned to her role on the panel for the 2013 series.

In 2012, Crabb began hosting her own TV program, Kitchen Cabinet, on ABC2 (later ABC1),an informal interview program with Australian politicians over a meal prepared by both Crabb and her guest.

In 2017, Crabb hosted a six-episode documentary series about the inner workings of Parliament House called The House.

In 2018, she hosted a seven-part series called Back in Time for Dinner, based on the format of UK show Back in Time for.... A family's home is transformed each week into a replica of a standard house from a different decade, with the family cooking and eating meals from that era.

In May 2018, the ABC flew Crabb and Jeremy Fernandez to London to host coverage of the wedding of Prince Harry and Meghan Markle.

Crabb wrote and presented a three-part documentary series for ABC Television called Annabel Crabb's Civic Duty, broadcast weekly from 10 November 2025. The series includes a number of little-known stories about the history and evolution of the Australian electoral system.

=== Chat 10 Looks 3 podcast ===
In November 2014, Crabb started a podcast with Leigh Sales called Chat 10 Looks 3. It is independent of the work they do for other media outlets and is an opportunity for them to talk about books, movies, television, the media and culture. The podcast won two awards at the 2019 Australian Podcast Awards in the “Literature, Arts & Music” and “TV, Film & Pop Culture” categories. Described by Sales and Crabb as shambolic and peripatetic, the podcast episodes are recorded every two to three weeks, and continues as of August 2026.

The podcast has spawned livestream shows in Australian capital cities and a book titled Well Hello published in September 2021. Self-proclaimed “chatters or chatterati” have formed a Chat 10 Looks 3 community on social media platforms built around the same tenets as the podcast – friendship, kindness, and an agreement to not discuss politics.

== Political views ==
Crabb is a regular political commentator with the ABC and Fairfax. She has written of former Australian prime minister Tony Abbott that as an opposition leader he was "potent, focused, absolutely deadly, and ultimately he succeeded", but of his period as prime minister she writes that Abbott's "most significant achievements ... were acts of dismantlement or shutting down: ending the carbon and mining taxes, stopping the boats." In a May 2016 study of Abbott's successor, Malcolm Turnbull, she wrote that he "struggled as Opposition leader", his major flaw being that "he overleapt his colleagues in an attempt to build something". Of his prime ministership she wrote: "Turnbull is more upbeat, more expansive ('waffly', his critics would say), less disciplined and less aggressive".

Crabb does not support reform of the controversial Section 18C of the Racial Discrimination Act 1975 limitations on free speech. She describes former Leader of the Opposition, Peter Dutton, as having a commitment to free speech which "fully covers the right of everyday Australians to make racist remarks". Crabb supported proposals to legislate for same-sex marriage, proposals that were ultimately successful. She has described businesses and service providers who refuse to cater to same-sex weddings as "homophobes".

== Gendered impacts of caring on work ==
Crabb has reported on the differential impact of parenting on workforce productivity and that following the birth of a child, fathers spend, on average, half the number of hours on household work that mothers do. Crabb shared demographic analysis by Jennifer Baxter of the Australian Institute of Family Studies showing that women spend on average 30 hours per week on household work, whereas men spend 15. In the 7am podcast, Crabb described the pattern, saying the graph "just leapt off the page", and that men's average work hours follow a flat line "like a cruiser, just cruising along". Crabb reported "Whenever she (Baxter) shows the graph at conferences, people just go... (intake of breath)". The analysis looks at paid working hours, child care and unpaid domestic work in heterosexual couples. "The work is so evocative, like in ER when someone has a very dangerous elevation, the heartbeat of a highly stressed and anxious person". She suggests that by changing both Australian laws and societal pressures, the disparity in hours spent on household work may be addressed, and that fathers may have more time and stronger relationships with their children.

Crabb has reported on policy which has changed gendered aspects of parenting and work. She said, "Employers are starting to recognise that the fathers of a young generation do want to be more involved in their kids lives than their dads were and that if you want to attract and retain great staff then trusting them to make the right decision in their private lives only strengthens their attachment to your workplace and commitment to the job you want them to do."

== Personal life ==
Crabb's husband is lawyer Jeremy Storer, brother of former South Australian senator Tim Storer. They have three children.

== Awards ==
- In 2009, her Quarterly Essay, titled "Stop at Nothing: The Life and Adventures of Malcolm Turnbull", won a Walkley Award for best magazine feature writing.
- In 2011, Crabb received an Eisenhower Fellowship.
- In 2017, the University of Adelaide presented Crabb with the James McWha Award of Excellence as a leader and outstanding role model.
- In 2020, she was the South Australia Award recipient in the Australian Awards for Excellence in Women's Leadership.

== Books published ==
- Losing It: The Inside Story of the Labor Party in Opposition. Picador Australia, 2005. ISBN 978-0-330-42216-1
- Quarterly Essay 34: Stop at Nothing: The Life and Adventures of Malcolm Turnbull. Black Inc., 2005. ISBN 978-1-863-95431-0
- Rise of the Ruddbot: Observations from the Gallery. Melbourne: Black Inc., 2010. ISBN 978-1-86395-483-9
- The Wife Drought. Melbourne: Random House Australia, 2014. ISBN 978-0-857-98426-5
- With Sharpe, Wendy. Special Delivery – Favourite Food To Make and Take. Murdoch Books Australia, 2015. ISBN 978-1-74336-619-6.
- With Sharpe, Wendy. Special Guest – Recipes for the happily imperfect host. Murdoch Books Australia, 2018. ISBN 9781760631949
- Quarterly Essay 75: Men at Work: Australia's Parenthood Trap. Black Inc., 2019. ISBN 978-1-76064-152-8
- With Leigh Sales: Well hello : meanderings from the world of Chat 10 Looks 3. Australia: Miranda Murphy. 2021. ISBN 978-1-76104-152-5. OCLC 1253457234.
- There’s a Prawn in Parliament House: The Kids’ Guide to Australia’s Amazing Democracy (2025)
