= Karen Hitchcock (author) =

Australian author and medical doctor

- Born: 1972 (age 53–54); Melbourne, Victoria, Australia
- Occupation: Author

Karen Hitchcock is an Australian author and medical doctor who published her first book of short stories in 2009. She has published in both medical and literary journals, including a publication in the "Best Australian Short Stories" and "Best Australian Essays" anthologies.

Her first book Little White Slips (Picador, 2009) won the 2010 Steele Rudd Award in the Queensland Premier's Literary Awards, was shortlisted in the 2010 NSW Premiers Literary Award and the Kibble/Dobie award for women writers.

Karen writes a regular column about medicine for The Monthly, and currently works as a physician in a large city hospital in Melbourne.

== Bibliography ==
=== Nonfiction ===
- Hitchcock, Karen (4 February 2020), The Medicine: A doctor's notes, Black Inc., an imprint of Schwartz Publishing Pty Ltd (published 2020), ISBN 978-1-76064-193-1

=== Short fiction ===
==== Collections ====
- Hitchcock, Karen (2009). Little white slips. Sydney: Picador Australia.

=== Selected essays and reporting ===
- Hitchcock, Karen (August 2014). "Crazy pills : our obsession with vitamins is getting out of hand". The Medicine. The Monthly. 103: 19.
- Hitchcock, Karen (14 March 2015), "Dear Life: On caring for the elderly", Quarterly Essay, vol. Quarterly Essay 57, Black Inc., an imprint of Schwartz Media Pty Ltd (published 2015), ISBN 978-1-86395-716-8, ISSN 1832-0953
