= The National Times =

The National Times, later National Times on Sunday, was an Australian weekly newspaper published by Fairfax News from 1971 to 1986.

== Background ==
The paper quickly developed a reputation for accurate investigative journalism, winning four consecutive Walkley Awards for best newspaper feature in 1975, 1976, 1977 and 1978. In the 1980s, it "exposed networks of influence and links between organised crime, and public administration in New South Wales".

It coincided with the publication of Nation Review (1970 to 1981), also a weekly newspaper.
