= The Monthly =

Australian publication

- November 2012 issue featuring Julia Gillard
- Editor: Michael Williams
- Categories: News/Literary magazine
- Frequency: 11
- Circulation: 10,000
- Publisher: Schwartz Publishing
- First issue: May 2005
- Company: The Monthly Pty Ltd
- Country: Australia
- Based in: Carlton, Victoria
- Language: Australian English
- Website: themonthly.com.au
- ISSN: 1832-3421

The Monthly is an Australian national magazine of politics, society and the arts, which is published eleven times per year on a monthly basis except the December/January issue. Founded in 2005, it is published by Melbourne property developer Morry Schwartz.

== Contributors ==
Contributors have included Mark Aarons, Waleed Aly, John Birmingham, Peter Conrad, Annabel Crabb, Richard Flanagan, Karen Middleton, Robert Forster, Anna Funder, Helen Garner, Anna Goldsworthy, Kerryn Goldsworthy, Ramachandra Guha, Gideon Haigh, M. J. Hyland, Linda Jaivin, Clive James, Kate Jennings, Paul Kelly, Benjamin Law, Amanda Lohrey, Mungo MacCallum, Shane Maloney, Robert Manne, David Marr, Maxine McKew, Drusilla Modjeska, Peter Robb, Kevin Rudd, Margaret Simons, Tim Soutphommasane, Lindsay Tanner, Malcolm Turnbull and Don Watson.

== Features ==
Essays

The magazine generally publishes essays 3,000 to 6,000 words long. The cover stories "Being There", Mark McKenna's investigation of key Australian historian Manning Clark, and Eric Ellis's profile of Wendi Deng Murdoch – the then-wife of media mogul Rupert Murdoch – were around 10,000 words long.

Early in 2006, The Monthly published "Information Idol: How Google is making us stupid" by Gideon Haigh, and "The Tall Man: Palm Island's Heart of Darkness" by Chloe Hooper which was extended to the book The Tall Man: Death and Life on Palm Island in 2008. Both pieces shared the 2006 John Curtin Prize for Journalism. Hooper's piece went on to win the 2006 Walkley Award for Magazine Feature Writing.

The Monthly has published in-depth essays that have impacted on Australian politics and politicians. "The Outcast of Camp Echo: The Punishment of David Hicks" by Alfred W. McCoy, "Faith in Politics" by Kevin Rudd, and "Gunns: Out of Control" by Richard Flanagan have given wider attention to the issues raised beyond the readership of the magazine.

50,000 copies of the essay "Gunns: Out of Control" were reprinted for letterboxing in the electorates of Australia's environment minister and opposition environment spokesperson by businessman Geoffrey Cousins who decided to mount a campaign against the proposed Bell Bay Pulp Mill in Tasmania after reading it in The Monthly.

Arts and Letters

The Monthly contains an Arts and Letters section with independent reviews on books, film, music, theatre, TV, fashion, art and architecture. Regular contributor, Robert Forster won the 2006 Pascall Prize for Critical Writing for his popular music criticism in The Monthly. The magazine ceased publishing letters from readers early in 2017. No explanation was ever provided for this decision and the website and print version continue to invite their contribution. In November 2021 the option of commenting on articles published online using the Disqus platform was removed. At the same time, comments on the magazine's Facebook page began to be moderated or disabled.

The Nation Reviewed

A section at the front of the magazine consisting of a national round-up in a handful of articles, each around 1,000 words. This section is an acknowledgment to the former businessman Gordon Barton who founded a weekly newspaper titled Nation Review.

Encounters

At the back of the magazine there was a one-page story recalling an unlikely but real historical meeting between two famous individuals, for example "Errol Flynn & Fidel Castro". Encounters was written by Shane Maloney and illustrated by Chris Grosz and was published as a collection in August 2011 by Black Inc.
