= Festival of Dangerous Ideas =

Australian social disruption festival

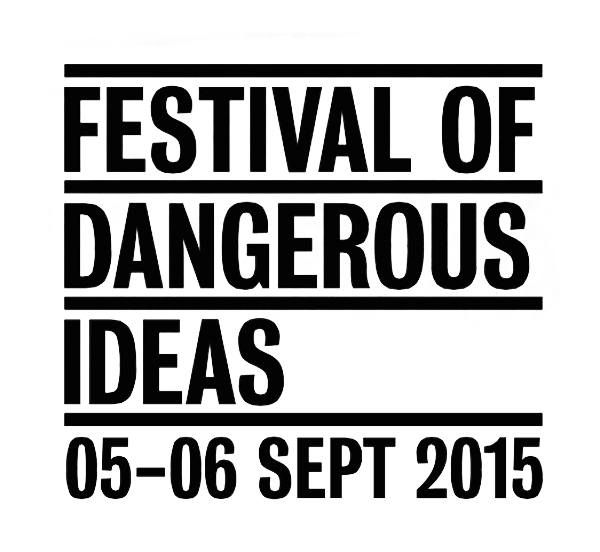
Poster for the 2015 edition

The Festival of Dangerous Ideas (FODI) is Australia's original disruptive festival that encourages debate and critical thinking, co-founded in 2009 by The Ethics Centre (formerly known as the St James Ethics Centre) and held in Sydney, Australia.

== History ==
The festival was presented at Sydney Opera House for eight years. When it was created, the festival aimed to bring leading thinkers and culture creators from around Australia and the world to discuss and debate important issues.

=== 2009 ===
In the inaugural 2009 event, the festival's opening address was given by atheism advocate Christopher Hitchens on the topic of "Religion Poisons Everything", which was countered by Australian Roman Catholic Cardinal George Pell in a session titled "Without God We Are Nothing".

Participants

- Keysar Trad (Muslim advocate)
- George Pell (Australian Roman Catholic Cardinal)
- Christopher Hitchens (Atheism advocate)
- Germaine Greer (Feminist)
- Susan Greenfield (Neuroscientist)
- Dambisa Moyo (African-futurist economist) The New York Times dubbed "Anti-Bono"
- Greg Barns (Columnist)
- Oliver Marc Hartwich (Economist)
- Norm Stamper former Chief of the Seattle Police Department
- Cassandra Wilkinson (President of FBi Radio)
- John Humphreys (libertarian economist)
- Chris Barrie (Retired admiral)

=== 2010 ===
Participants

- Alan Dershowitz
- Geoffrey Robertson
- Waleed Aly
- Annabel Crabb
- Elizabeth Farrelly
- Miriam Lyons
- Marcus Westbury
- John Quiggin
- P.W. Singer
- Andrew Leigh
- Tariq Ali
- Ross Gittins
- Paul McGeough
- David Hetherington
- Luke Malpass
- Tom Switzer
- Steve Biddulph
- Cordelia Fine
- Clive Hamilton
- Eric Kaufmann
- Rebecca Huntley
- David Marr
- Chris Taylor
- Marcus Westbury
- Lenore Skenazy
- Hugh Mackay
- John Keane
- Anne Manne
- Fred Chaney
- Julian Morrow

=== 2011 ===
Participants

- Julian Assange
- Alexander McCall Smith
- Jonathan Safran Foer
- Jon Ronson
- Mike Daisey
- Marc Thiessen
- Emmanuel Jal
- Kate Adie
- Christopher Ryan
- Andrew Leigh
- Slavoj Žižek
- Salil Shetty
- Mona Eltahawy
- Lisa Pryor
- Samah Hadid
- Catharine Lumby
- Roy Masters
- Michael Kirby
- Alison Broinowski
- Rebecca Huntley
- Richard Denniss
- David Marr
- Alan Noble
- Martin Rogers
- Alec Cameron
- Jim Wallace
- Cheryl Kernot
- Philip Nitschke
- Dick Smith
- Julian Burnside
- Simon Sheikh
- Bronwyn Fredericks
- Aileen Moreton-Robinson
- Stephanie Alexander
- Gabrielle Hamilton
- Appelspiel

=== 2012 ===
Participants

- Sam Harris
- Illan Pappe
- Germaine Greer
- Tim Harford
- Jason Silva
- Joe Hildebrand
- Gideon Haigh
- Jesse Bering
- Bishop Julian Porteous
- Jane Bussmann
- Eliza Griswold
- Ed Howker
- Shiv Malik
- Alberto Giubilini
- Francesca Minerva
- Peter Fitzsimons
- Simon Laham
- Corman Cullinan
- Guy Pearse
- Appelspiel
- Brian Morris
- Alec Doomadgee
- Samah Hadid
- Ronnie Chan
- Li Cunxin
- Geoffrey Garrett
- Jianying Zha
- Stan Grant
- Pasi Sahlberg
- Eva Cox
- Tara Moss
- Richard Heinberg
- Michael Anderson
- Chris Leithner

=== 2013 ===
Participants

- David Simon
- Hanna Rosin
- Evgeny Morozov
- Vandana Shiva
- Lawrence Krauss
- Peter Rollins
- Peter Hitchens
- Arlie Hochschild
- Dan Savage
- Kirby Ferguson
- John Safran
- Erwin James
- Peter Moskos
- Mustafa Bargouthi
- Conrad Black
- Malcolm Knox
- Christos Tsiolkas
- Patricia Edgar
- Dennis Altman
- James Fallows
- Joe Hildebrand
- James O'Loghlin
- Julian Burnside
- Chris Berg
- Emily Maguire
- Simran Sethi

=== 2014 ===
The 2014 festival was criticised due to the links between the St James Ethics Centre and companies that profit from the mandatory indefinite detention of asylum seekers.

Participants

- Masha Alekhina
- Liz Ann MacGregor
- Bettina Arndt
- David Baker
- Peter Berner
- Lydia Cacho
- Mark Carnegie
- Jane Caro
- Bob Carr
- Simon Crerar
- Kirsten Drysdale
- Tim Duggan
- Kajsa Ekis Ekman
- Whitney Fitzsimmons
- Kitty Flanagan
- Tim Flannery
- Malcolm Fraser
- Peter Fray
- Bradley Garrett
- Masha Gessen
- Peter Hartcher
- John Hewson
- Lewis Hobba
- Kay Hymowitz
- Dan Ilic
- Nöelle Janaczewska
- Elizabeth Kolbert
- Mark Latham
- Anne Manne
- Francesca Minerva
- Natasha Mitchell
- Rebecca Newberger Goldstein
- Emily Nussbaum
- Alissa Nutting
- Dave O'Neil
- Gordon Parker
- John Pilger
- Steven Pinker
- Elizabeth Pisani
- Huw Price
- Glenn Robbins
- Chip Rolley
- Sir Salman Rushdie
- Mark Scott
- Judith Sloan
- Tom Switzer
- Jaan Tallinn
- Nadya Tolokonnikova
- Stella Young
- Ragip Zarakolu

=== 2015 ===
In 2015, the seventh Festival of Dangerous Ideas was made up of solo sessions and panels featuring speakers such as Tariq Ali, Naomi Klein, Peter Greste, Gabriella Coleman, Sarai Walker, AC Grayling, Marc Lewis, Paul Krugman, Laurie Penny, Jon Ronson, Eric Schlosser and Gideon Raff. For the first time, FODI Melbourne also took place as part of the Melbourne Writers Festival.

Participants

- Tariq Ali
- Professor Frank Brennan
- Anna Broinowski
- James Colley
- Peter C. Doherty
- Clementine Ford
- Martin Ford
- Damon Gameau
- Dennis Glover
- AC Grayling
- Peter Greste
- Johann Hari
- Dan Ilic
- James Jericho
- Dr Helen Joyce
- Suki Kim
- Michael Kirby
- Naomi Klein
- Paul Krugman
- Marc Lewis
- Miriam Lyons
- Jane Martin
- Chris Munro
- Malarndirri McCarthy
- Kate McCartney
- Laurie Penny
- Gideon Raff
- Helen Razer
- Jon Ronson
- John Safran
- Eric Schlosser
- Jordan Shanks
- Rebecca Shaw
- Sarai Walker
- Michael Wesley
- Sarah Wilson
- Murong Xuecun
- The Moth

=== 2016 ===
In 2016, the Festival of Dangerous Ideas was held at the Sydney Opera House for the final time. It featured speakers such as Jesse Bering, Andrew Bolt, Molly Crabapple, Alicia Garza (Black Lives Matter), Henry Rollins (Black Flag) and Lionel Shriver.

Participants

- John Bell (Australian actor)
- Jesse Bering
- Andrew Bolt
- Raewyn Connell
- Molly Crabapple
- Annabel Crabb
- Stephen Dank
- Satyajit Das
- Pat Dudgeon
- Tobias Feakin
- Cordelia Fine
- Tim Flannery
- Lisa Forrest
- Alicia Garza (Black Lives Matter)
- Bates Gill
- Priyamvada Gopal
- Kevan Gosper
- Stan Grant (journalist)
- A.C. Grayling
- Germaine Greer
- Lev Grossman
- Tracey Holmes
- Sarah Houbolt
- Shanto Iyengar
- Simon Jackman
- Alok Jha
- Miranda Johnson
- Michael Kirby (judge)
- Brian Lipson
- Sheryn Lee
- Philippe Legrain
- Ming Long
- Hamish Macdonald
- Dee Madigan
- David Marr
- Jason Mazanov
- Jane McAdam
- Lloyd Newson
- Norman Ornstein
- George Packer
- Jennifer Rayner
- John Elder Robison
- Henry Rollins
- Alexei Sayle
- Laura Secor
- Lionel Shriver
- Tim Soutphommasane
- Neil Strauss
- Lee Vinsel
- Sheila Watt-Cloutier
- Daniel Webb
- Jennifer Whelan

=== 2017 ===
In 2017 the Sydney Opera House announced that it was no longer presenting the Festival of Dangerous Ideas. It announced ANTIDOTE: a festival of art, ideas and action featuring speakers such as Janet Mock, Reni Eddo-Lodge, Tamika D. Mallory (Women's March on Washington) and Micah M. White (Occupy Wall Street) and artists such as Noemi Lakmaier, Anne Collod and Kaleider.

=== 2018 ===
In 2018 the Festival of Dangerous Ideas was independently presented by The Ethics Centre on Cockatoo Island. It featured two days of discussions on internet sub-cultures, fascism, privacy and LSD. In addition, there was a special event at Sydney Town Hall with Stephen Fry. Speakers included Niall Ferguson, Pankaj Mishra, Megan Phelps-Roper, Zeynup Tufecki, Seth Stephens-Davidowitz, Ayelet Waldman, Germaine Greer, Toby Walsh, Nikki Goldstein and Xanthé Mallett. The 2018 festival also saw the inaugural Festival of Dangerous Art which included artists Betty Grumble, Garth Knight and Riley Harmon.

Participants

- Adam Ni
- Angela Nagle
- Ayelet Waldman
- Chuck Klosterman
- Donna Green
- Germaine Greer
- Darren Goodsir
- Haris Aziz
- Jeremy Moss
- Judith Sloan
- Khandis Blake
- Linda Jakobson
- Matt Beard
- Megan Phelps-Roper
- Mick Dodson
- Niall Ferguson
- Nikki Goldstein
- Pankaj Mishra
- Rebecca Huntley
- Richard Holden
- Riley Harmon
- Rob Brooks
- Rosalind Dixon
- Seth Stephens-Davidowitz
- Stephen Fry
- Susan Dodds
- Toby Walsh
- Xanthé Mallett
- Tim Soutphommasane
- Zeynep Tufekci
- Zhao Hai

=== 2020 ===
Australia's original provocative ideas festival was set to return in 2020 for its 10th festival. It was set to be held at Sydney Town Hall and themed around "dangerous realities". In March 2020, the festival was cancelled due to the coronavirus pandemic as the NSW Minister of Health issued a ban of non-essential public gatherings of over 500 people. In May, the festival launched FODI Digital. Speakers included Kevin Rudd, Daisy Jeffrey, David A. Sinclair, Eleanor Gordon-Smith, Stan Grant, and Tim Soutphommasane. A second series of FODI Digital conversations were launched in September 2020 featuring Edward Snowden, Marcia Langton, and David Wallace-Wells.

=== 2022 ===
In 2022 the Festival of Dangerous Ideas returned live and in person at the Carriageworks arts centre, presented by The Ethics Centre. Occurring over two days in September, the program featured over 72 speakers and artists, including 8 international guests, with discussions on authoritarianism, social networks, politics, artificial intelligence and algorithms, gender, and the Enlightenment. Speakers included Frances Haugen, Steven Pinker, Jacqui Lambie, Kevin Roose, Alok Vaid-Menon, Adam Tooze, Ruth Ben-Ghiat and Badiucao. The lineup also offered a range of art and experiences including Scott Campbell's Whole Glory, Counterpilot and Legs on the Wall.

Participants

- Waleed Aly
- Brook Andrew
- Felix Aplin
- Badiucao
- Adam Bayes
- Ruth Ben-Ghiat
- Joanna Bourke
- Daniel Browning
- Nick Bryant
- Scott Campbell
- Jane Caro
- Damien Cave
- Corrie Chen
- Claire G. Coleman
- Counterpilot
- Jayne Crossling
- Tim Dean
- Geraldine Doogue
- Coby Edgar
- Kate Faasse
- Luara Ferracioli
- Stan Grant
- Osher Günsberg
- Kelly Hamilton
- Scott Hargreaves
- Frances Haugen
- Jess Hill
- Lewis Hobba
- Dan Ilic
- Narelda Jacobs
- Emma A. Jane
- Karen Jones
- Ian Kemish
- Lydia Khalil
- Jacqui Lambie
- Legs on the Wall
- Lucas Lixinski
- Simon Longstaff
- Wenlei Ma
- Hamish Macdonald
- David McBride
- Kate McClymont
- Tema Milstein
- Kylie Moore-Gilbert
- Ann Mossop
- Sisonke Msimang
- Saxon Mullins
- Georgia Naldrett
- Lucy Peach
- Bronwyn Penrith
- Sangeetha Pillai
- Steven Pinker
- Paul-Mikhail Catapang Podosky
- Yasmin Poole
- Carl Rhodes
- Kevin Roose
- Amber Schultz
- Scott Stephens
- Adam Tooze
- Alok Vaid-Menon
- Toby Walsh
- Don Weatherburn
- Cathy Wilcox

=== 2024 ===
In 2024 the Festival of Dangerous Ideas, presented by The Ethics Centre, was held live and in person at Carriageworks in August 2024. The biggest Festival since 2016, FODI brought together 87 of the world's leading speakers (Masha Gessen, David Runciman, Roxane Gay, David Baddiel, Megan Phelps-Roper) with artists and audiences, to meet and exchange ideas. The lineup also offered a range of art and experiences including TAPE by Numen / For Use and performances from Re:group performance collective, and Vicki Van Hout with Marian Abboud.

Participants

- Patrick Abboud
- Marian Abboud
- Louise Adler
- Waleed Aly
- Brook Andrew
- Violette Ayad
- Monty Badami
- David Baddiel
- Matt Beard
- Gil Beckwith
- David Benatar
- Jem Bendell
- Matt Bevan
- David Blunt
- Rob Brooks
- Meredith Burgmann
- Tarang Chawla
- Ed Coper
- Alice Dawkins
- Tim Dean
- Avani Dias
- Geraldine Doogue
- Megan Evans
- Todd Fernando
- Luara Ferracioli
- Daniel Finlay
- Verity Firth
- Michael Flood
- John N. Friedman
- Roxane Gay
- Brigitte Gerstl
- Masha Gessen
- Bronwyn Graham
- Stan Grant
- Declan Greene
- Jen Gunter
- Paul Ham
- Danielle Harvey
- Myra Hamilton
- Richard Holden
- Coleman Hughes
- Narelda Jacobs
- Fran Kely
- Sam Koslowski
- Laura Kotevska
- Anna Krien
- Antoinette Lattouf
- Benjamin Law
- Cheng Lei
- Simon Longstaff
- Mianna Lotz
- Kosta Lucas
- Hamish Macdonald
- Kathryn Mackay
- Saree Makdisi
- Andy Mills
- Natasha Mitchell
- Sarah Morley
- Ann Mossop
- Maher Mughrabi
- Numen / For Use
- Sandersan Onie
- Lizzie O'shea
- Bronwyn Penrith
- Megan Phelps-Roper
- Re:Group Performance Collective
- Carl Rhodes
- Michael Richardson
- Margot Riley
- David Runciman
- Emile Sherman
- Scott Stephens
- Patrick Stokes
- Yumi Stynes
- Josh Szeps
- Jean Twenge
- Jordan Van Den Berg
- Emily Van Der Nagel
- Vicki Van Hout
- Charlie Villas
- Toby Walsh
- Stephanie Ward
- Johanna Weaver
- Sonny Jane Wise

== Podcast ==
In February 2022, FODI launched "FODI: The In-Between", a podcast series featuring eight conversations between 16 academics, writers and public figures. Participants included Stephen Fry, Roxane Gay, Waleed Aly, Peter Singer, Slavoj Žižek, Naomi Klein and more. The series explored climate change, politics, artificial intelligence, social media topics and the changing role of knowledge and truth. The podcasts were recorded in 2021 during the festival.
