= Elizabeth MacKenzie =

Canadian artist based in Vancouver (born 1955)

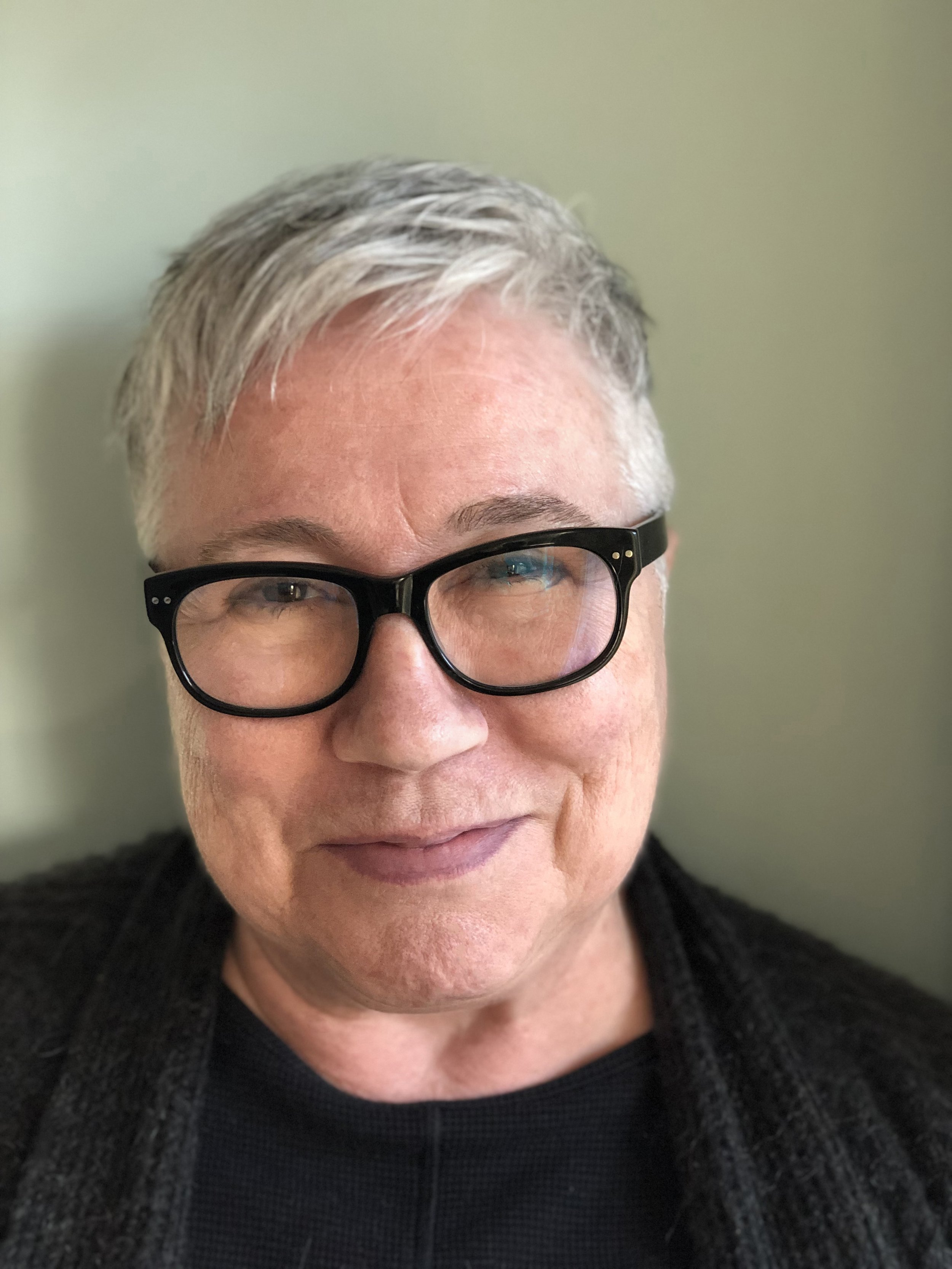
MacKenzie in 2019

Elizabeth MacKenzie (born 1955) is a Canadian artist based in Vancouver known for her drawing, installation and video since the early eighties. MacKenzie uses drawing to explore the productive aspects of uncertainty through the use of repetition, interrogations of portraiture and considerations of intersubjective experience. Her work has been characterized by an interest in maternal ambivalence, monstrous bodies, interrogations of portraiture and considerations of the complexity of familial and other interpersonal relations.

== Early life and education ==
Elizabeth MacKenzie was born 1955 in Trois-Rivières, Québec. MacKenzie graduated from the Ontario College of Art in 1979 and received an MFA from the University of Saskatchewan in 1993.

== Curating and professional roles ==
Elizabeth MacKenzie is sessional faculty at Emily Carr University in Vancouver. She co-curated a number of exhibitions including Persistent Resistance: Early video in Vancouver exhibition in Vancouver with Canadian art historian and Curator Jennifer Fisher and artist and professor, Marina Roy at the VIVO Media Arts Centre in 2008. She co-lead with Cindy Mochizuki and Kristina Fiedrich the Vancouver Draw Down 2011: Summer of Ten Thousand Drawings a citywide workshop series sponsored by the Vancouver Park Board.

== Practice and collaborations ==
Her practice includes an ongoing commitment to collaboration, curating, writing and teaching. Elizabeth MacKenzie is also one of the founding board members of the YYZ Gallery in Toronto. The Underside of Shadows was a collaboration between MacKenzie and writer Jeanne Randolph that undertook to extend their earlier long distance, technologically mediated collaboration at Artspeak Gallery in Vancouver from September 8 to October 13, 2001. MacKenzie's work has been contextualized alongside visual artist Nancy Spero in Jo Anna Isaak's book; Feminism and Contemporary Art: The Revolutionary Power of Women’s Laughter. MacKenzie produced the video I am an Artist My name is.... in 1986 with Canadian artist and York University Associate Professor Judith Schwarz.

== Exhibitions ==
Solo exhibitions include UnBecoming: An Annotated Exhibition, curated by Sarah Cavanaugh in 2016 at Seymour Art Gallery in North Vancouver.The Gaze of History: Portraits from the Collection, curated by Darrin Martens, Burnaby Art Gallery at Deer Lake (British Columbia) in 2012. "At the BAG, MacKenzie has used powdered graphite to draw portraits of the building’s former occupants directly on the gallery’s white walls. The effect she achieves is pale, insubstantial, ephemeral—ghostly, really." Reunion, curated by Corrine Corry at the Richmond Art Gallery in Richmond, British Columbia. In the 2004 review of this exhibition art critic Robin Laurence writes; "Reunion seems to be about the slippery intersection of love, loss, memory, and meaning; about attempts to call up the dead through both photography and obsessive recollection; and about the impossibility of fixing any person, place, or thing through such attempts." The Underside of Shadows, in 2001 with writer Jeanne Randolph at Artspeak Gallery in Vancouver. Group exhibitions include; Mount Saint Vincent Art Gallery (Halifax), the Agnes Etherington Art Centre (Kingston), the Glenbow Museum (Calgary), the Mackenzie Art Gallery (Regina) and the Vancouver Art Gallery (Vancouver).Dessin-Installation-Drawing-Installation in 1984 at The Sadye Bronfman Centre for the Arts in Montréal curated by Diana Nemiroff.

== Collections ==
Elizabeth MacKenzie's work is in the collection of the National Gallery of Canada and found in the Art Bank at The Canada Council, as well as the Burnaby Art Gallery.

== Selected bibliography ==
- Betterton, Rosemary (2014). Maternal Bodies in the Visual Arts. Manchester University Press. ISBN 978-0-7190-8348-8.
- Biggs, Lesley (2011). Gendered Intersections:An Introduction to Women’s and Gender Studies. Canada: Fernwood Publishing. p. 259. ISBN 9781552664131.
- Love, Karen (2002). Facing History Portraits from Vancouver. Vancouver: Arsenal Pulp. pp. 26–27. ISBN 9781551521275.
- Belton, Robert (2001). Sights of Resistance: Approaches to Canadian Visual Culture. Calgary: University of Calgary Press. ISBN 9781552380116.
