= WIF =

The term WIF or WiF may refer to:

- ISO 639:wif or Wik-Me'nh is a Paman language of the Cape York Peninsula of Queensland, Australia
- Mercenaries 2: World in Flames, video game
- Water in Fuel Sensor, a type of water sensor
- Water immersion facility, a neutral buoyancy pool used for the Gemini and Apollo space programs
- Web Impact Factor, in webometrics
- West Indies Federation, a former federation of British Caribbean colonies
- WIF 933 or Widerøe Flight 933, a 1982 plane crash in the Barents Sea near Gamvik, Norway
- WIF domain, a protein domain
- WIF1, a lipid-binding protein
- Windows Identity Foundation, authentication software technology by Microsoft
- Women in Focus, a Canadian feminist film organization
- World Investment Forum, a United Nations Conference on Trade and Development (UNCTAD) Division on Investment and Enterprise
- Women in Film, a non-profit organization for women in filmmaking
