= The Ethics Centre =

Australian not-for-profit organization

- Formation: November 1989
- Type: NGO
- Legal status: Charity
- Purpose: Ethics; ethical decision-making
- Location: Sydney
- Region served: Australia
- Executive director: Dr Simon Longstaff
- Website: ethics.org.au
- Formerly called: St James Ethics Centre

The Ethics Centre, formerly the St James Ethics Centre, is an independent not-for-profit organisation that provides a non-judgmental forum for promoting and exploring ethics and ethical decision-making. The Ethics Centre works with business, professions, community groups, governments, and individuals to encourage and assist them to include the ethical dimension in their daily lives. The Centre is based in Sydney.

== Background ==
The Ethics Centre was launched in 1989 by The Anglican Parish of St James' Church, Sydney to work with business in the city to promote ethics and ethical decision-making. In 1996 the St James Ethics Centre became entirely independent from the church. It is now a secular organisation open to those of any or no faith. The Centre was renamed "the Ethics Centre".

The centre's executive director, Dr Simon Longstaff, began his working life on Groote Eylandt in the Northern Territory. He has kinship ties to the Anindilyakwa people. After studying law in Sydney and teaching in Tasmania, he pursued postgraduate studies as a member of Magdalene College, Cambridge.

In 1991 Longstaff started work as the first executive director of the Ethics Centre. In 2013 he was made an officer of the Order of Australia (AO) for "distinguished service to the community through the promotion of ethical standards in governance and business, to improving corporate responsibility, and to philosophy." He is an honorary professor at the Australian National University, and a fellow of CPA Australia, the Royal Society of NSW, and the Australian Risk Policy Institute.

Through his work at the Ethics Centre he continues to discuss and examine ethics-related issues in the media.

== Description ==
The Centre has expanded its scope from Sydney-based to national and occasionally international projects. It receives no government funding and relies on support from business and individuals.

The centre offers Ethi-Call, a free "Ethics Counselling Service" to anyone who may be facing an ethical dilemma. According to the centre's website, it is believed to be the only service of its kind in the world and is the reason for the centre's classification as a public benevolent institution.

Following almost eight years of lobbying by parents, the Federation of P&C Associations of NSW, and the Ethics Centre, parliament amended the NSW Education Act on 1 December 2010 to give students who do not attend Special Religious Education/Scripture classes in NSW public schools the legal right to attend philosophical ethics classes as an option to supervised ‘private study.’

The NSW government tasked the Ethics Centre to develop and deliver ethics education classes in urban, regional and rural primary schools. The Ethics Centre promptly established Primary Ethics, an independent not-for-profit organisation, to develop an engaging, age-appropriate, interconnected curriculum that spans the primary years from Kindergarten to Year 6, and to then deliver ethics education free of charge via a network of specially trained and accredited volunteers.

Ethics classes have since been implemented in more than 500 schools in NSW, and Primary Ethics has established itself as a highly effective education provider within the public school system.

== Festival of Dangerous Ideas ==
The Festival of Dangerous Ideas (FODI) is a disruptive festival that encourages debate and critical thinking, co-founded in 2009 by the Ethics Centre and the Sydney Opera House.

The Festival was presented at Sydney Opera House for eight years.

In June 2014 the Festival of Dangerous Ideas announced a lecture by Hizb ut-Tahrir spokesman Uthman Badar entitled "Honour Killings Are Morally Justified". Following negative responses from the community, the lecture was cancelled, with Longstaff saying the "Islamophobes" have won the day and Badar saying it shows the extent and depth of Islamophobia in Australia.

In 2017 the Sydney Opera House announced that it was no longer presenting the Festival of Dangerous Ideas. It announced ANTIDOTE: a festival of art, ideas and action featuring speakers such as Janet Mock, Reni Eddo-Lodge, Tamika D. Mallory (Women's March on Washington) and Micah M. White (Occupy Wall Street), and artists such as Noemi Lakmaier, Anne Collod and Kaleider.

In 2018 the Festival of Dangerous Ideas was independently presented by the Ethics Centre on Cockatoo Island, with two days of discussions on internet sub-cultures, fascism, privacy and LSD. Speakers included Stephen Fry, Niall Ferguson, Pankaj Mishra, Megan Phelps-Roper, Zeynup Tufecki, Seth Stephens-Davidowitz, Ayelet Waldman, Germaine Greer, Toby Walsh, Nikki Goldstein and Xanthe Mallett.

The Festival was set to return in 2020 for its 10th year. 3–5 April was to be a milestone weekend at Sydney Town Hall, themed around "dangerous realities"; but on 16 March, the 2020 Festival of Dangerous Ideas was officially cancelled due to the COVID-19 pandemic, as the NSW Minister of Health had issued a ban of non-essential public gatherings of more than 500 people.

In May 2020 the Festival launched a series of digital conversations called FODI Digital. The series of online conversations takes inspiration from the original FODI 2020 theme of ‘Dangerous Realities’, with online sessions being streamed via the Festival website. The series interrogated the reality of the current pandemic and its wider implications for our world and society. Speakers included Kevin Rudd, Daisy Jeffrey, David Sinclair, Eleanor Gordon-Smith, Stan Grant, and Tim Soutphommasane.

A second series of FODI Digital conversations was launched in September 2020, featuring Edward Snowden, Marcia Langton and David Wallace-Wells.

== IQ2 debates ==
Intelligence Squared, known as IQ2, is an international debate series where diverse speakers discuss issues of public interest. Originally established in 2002 in London, the Ethics Centre has presented the Australian version for more than a decade.

== Supporters ==
The Centre is financially supported by donations. Notable organisations which have donated money or other resources to the centre include Mordant Investments, University of New South Wales, ANZ, Westpac, BHP, the City of Sydney, and Woolworths Group.
