= Business Today =

Business Today may refer to:

- Business Today (student magazine), an American, non-profit student organization
- Business Today (India), an Indian fortnightly business magazine
- Business Today (Philippine TV program), 1990–1996 Philippine television public affairs show
- Business Today (Australian TV program), 2006–2014 Australian television program
- Business Today Egypt, English business magazine published in Cairo, Egypt
