= Stephen Muecke =

Australian linguist

Stephen Muecke (born 1951) is an Australian ethnographer. He is an Emeritus Professor of Ethnography at the University of New South Wales, Australia and adjunct professor at the Nulungu Institute, University of Notre Dame, Broome. He studied linguistics and semiotics, completing his PhD on storytelling techniques among Aboriginal people in Broome, Western Australia.

== Publications ==
Muecke's PhD research resulted in Gularabulu: Stories from the West Kimberley, Fremantle Arts Centre Press, 1983. The storyteller was Indigenous leader Paddy Roe (OAM). They later collaborated on the prizewinning Reading the Country: Introduction to Nomadology (Fremantle, 1984) with landscape painter Krim Benterrak, a postmodern ethnography of Roebuck Plains, near Broome. A recent book with Paddy Roe is The Children's Country: The Creation of a Goolarabooloo Future in North-West Australia (2020). In 1993, Muecke became the first Professor of Cultural Studies in Australia, at the University of Technology, Sydney, where he worked from 1985 to 2009.

Muecke is a significant proponent of fictocritical writing, the travelogue No Road (bitumen all the way) (Fremantle 1997) being the first Australian monograph in this genre; a later collection is Joe in the Andamans and Other Fictocritical Stories (Local Consumption, 2008). Both books were shortlisted for major literary prizes.

With Adam Shoemaker he edited the writings of David Unaipon, Legendary Tales of the Australian Aborigines (Melbourne University Press, 2001), and co-edited with Jack Davis and Mudrooroo Narogin the first anthology of Black Australian writings, Paperbark: A Collection of Black Australian Writings, (University of QLD Press, 1990). He identified that the book Myths and Legends of the Aborigines by William Ramsay Smith was actually mainly written by Unaipon. Again with Adam Shoemaker, he co-authored a book about Aboriginal Australians entitled Les Aborigènes d'Australie (2002), which was published in the French collection “Découvertes Gallimard”. The English edition, Aboriginal Australians: First Nations of an Ancient Continent, appeared in 2004, published by Thames & Hudson.

Cultural Studies research on the Indian Ocean from 2000 has led to Cultures of Trade, edited with Devleena Ghosh (Cambridge Scholars, 2007), and a collaborative work with the photographer Max Pam, Contingency in Madagascar (Intellect, 2012).

Muecke was elected a Fellow of the Australian Academy of the Humanities in 1998.
