= Cecep =

Cecep is a masculine given name found in Indonesia. Notable people with this name include:

- Cecep Arif Rahman (born 1972), an Indonesian martial artist and actor
- Cecep Supriatna (born 1975), an Indonesian former football player
- Cecep Syamsul Hari (born 1967), an Indonesian poet
- Ferdiansyah Cecep (born 2003), an Indonesian football player
