= Syamsul =

Syamsul is a Southeast Asian name that may refer to the following notable people:

== Given name ==
- As'ad Syamsul Arifin (1897–1990), Indonesian national hero
- Cecep Syamsul Hari (born 1967), Indonesian poet
- Syamsul Alam (died after 1727), Indonesian sultan
- Syamsul Anwar Harahap (born 1952), Indonesian boxer
- Syamsul Chaeruddin (born 1983), Indonesian football midfielder
- Syamsul Saad (born 1975), Malaysian football defender
- Syamsul Yusof (born 1984), Malaysian actor, film director, writer, producer and singer

== Surname ==
- Nazrin Syamsul (born 1990), Malaysian football player
