= Natalka Husar =

American-born Canadian painter (born 1951)

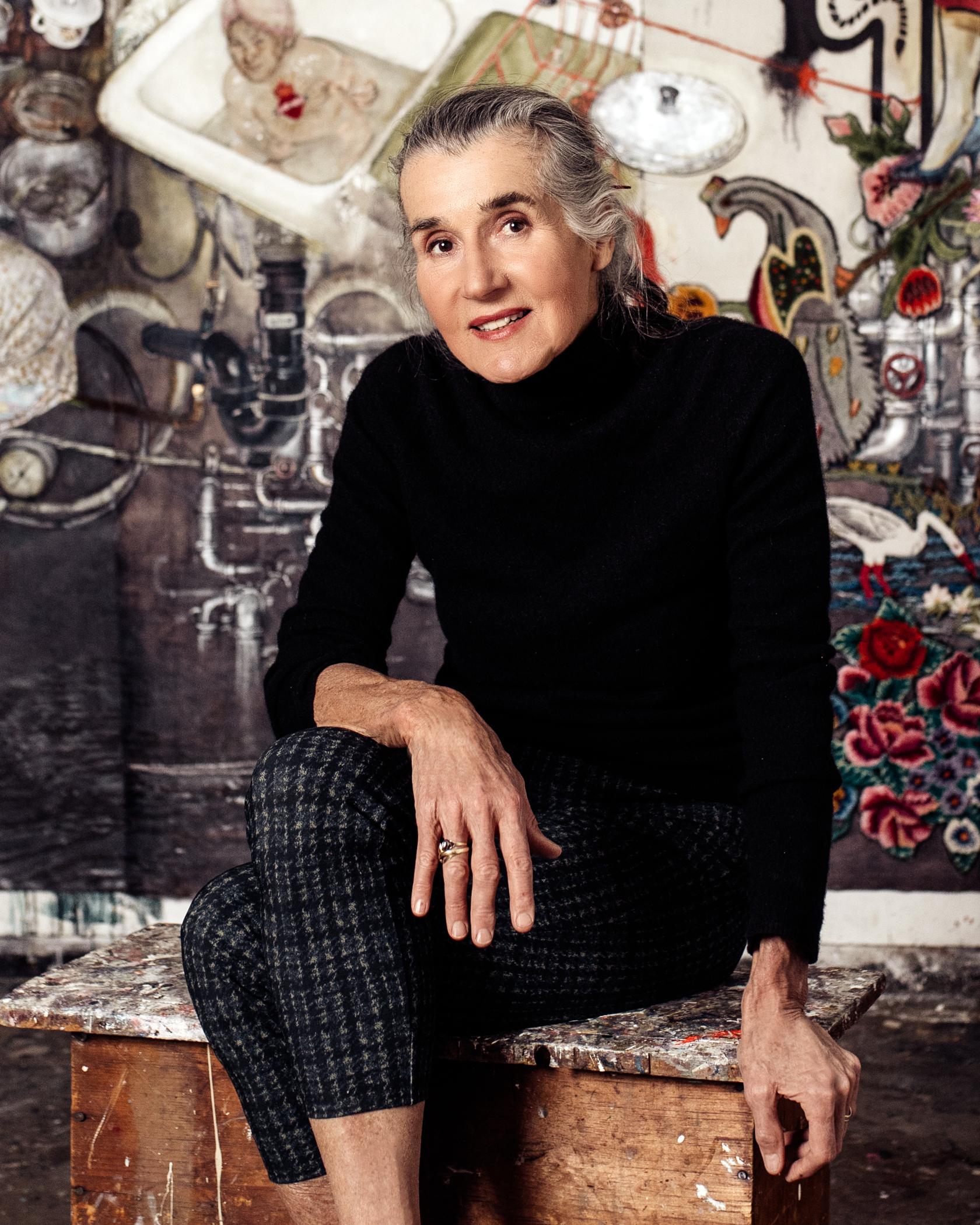
- Natalka Husar by Alexandra Petruck
- Born: Natalka Husar; 1951 (age 74–75); New Jersey, United States
- Education: B.F.A., Rutgers University, New Jersey
- Known for: Painter

Natalka Husar (born 1951) is an American-born Canadian painter. She is known for work that draws on aspects of Ukrainian culture and history, the émigré experience, and her feminist concerns.

== Early life and education ==
Natalka Husar’s Ukrainian-born parents, Daria Struk and Wasyl Husar and brother Danylo emigrated from a post-WWII Displaced Persons camp in Germany to the United States. They settled in New Jersey, where Natalka Husar was born. She earned a Bachelor of Fine Arts degree from Rutgers University in 1973, moving to Toronto Canada shortly after.

== Work and themes ==
Husar's earliest exhibited works were trompe l'oeile ceramics, but after working as a flight attendant in the early 1980s, she began painting, with subject matter drawn from travel-work experience, and the paradoxes and conflicts of the Ukrainian émigré experience. In 1986, critic Robert Enright wrote "Husar uses her art as a bracing tonic; splashed in these big confrontational paintings is a conscience and a care that is almost excessive and certainly troubling". Cultural Historian George Melnyk commented on Husar's leitmotif of inserting herself into paintings as aging, young, different characters, clothed and nude: "she sees the role of the artist as one of disguising elements of the self, of addressing anxieties."

Husar taught painting at the Ontario College of Art University (OCAD) as an associate professor from 1990 to 2011 and has been the recipient of numerous arts grants.

== Key solo exhibitions ==
=== 2009–2012. Burden of Innocence ===
A collaboration and touring exhibition with the Macdonald Stewart Art Centre (now the Art Gallery of Guelph), McMaster Museum of Art, Museum London, Tom Thomson Art Gallery and the MacKenzie Art Gallery. It was also shown at the Douglas Udell galleries in Edmonton and Vancouver.

Devised as a history play in three acts, Husar's painting were interwoven social narratives between Ukrainian society and Soviet-style attitudes through fictional characters and her persona-characters. The concluding triptych painting includes a banquet of these characters in the form of a trial. TheBurden of Innocence exhibition was accompanied by two publications, Husar Handbook and a limited edition artist bookwork Burden of Innocence and a double-book version.

=== 2002–2002. Blond with Dark Roots ===
Organized by the Art Gallery of Hamilton, and toured to the Winnipeg Art Gallery, Justina M. Barnicke Gallery (now part of the Art Museum at the University of Toronto) and the Tom Thomson Memorial Art Gallery (now the Tom Thomson Art Gallery). The catalogue texts examined Husar's use of fictional female identities, including poems by Janice Kulyk Keefer written in the voices of the characters in the paintings.

=== 1995–1996. Black Sea Blue ===
Organized by the Rosemont Art Gallery in Regina and toured to Garnet Press Gallery (Toronto), the Douglas Udell galleries in Vancouver and Edmonton, The Robert McLaughlin Gallery and the Mendel Art Gallery in Saskatoon (now Remai Modern).

=== 1991–1992. True Confessions ===
Organized by the Woltjen/Udell Gallery – shown in Vancouver and Edmonton – and toured to Garnet Press Gallery (Toronto), and Plug-In, Winnipeg. Catalogue essayists Robert Enright and Donna Lypchuk examining the "psycho-social awareness" and "feminism" in Husar's paintings

=== 1988–1989. Milk and Blood ===
Organized by The Floating Curatorial Gallery at Women in Focus in Vancouver, which toured to the Ukrainian Cultural and Educational Centre in Winnipeg, Garnet Press Gallery (Toronto), Forest City Gallery the Laurentian University Museum and Arts Centre in Sudbury, Latitude 53, Edmonton and The Station Gallery, Whitby. Essayist Grace Thomson defined the themes in Husar's paintings "as the contradictions of ethnicity and gender expectations and describes how this work addresses patriarchal ethnic culture."

=== Selected group exhibitions ===
- 2015–2018. Living Building Thinking: art and expressionism, organized and circulated by the McMaster Museum of Art.
- 2015–2016. The Ukrainian Diaspora: Women Artists 1908–2015, The Ukrainian Museum New York.
- 2016. Reality Check, Contemporary art in Ukraine since its independence, Ukrainian Institute of Modern Art, Chicago.

== Works in Canadian public collections ==
- National Gallery of Canada
- Art Gallery of Ontario
- Art Gallery of Hamilton
- Art Gallery of Alberta
- Beaverbrook Art Gallery
- Canada Council Art Bank
- The Canadian Museum of History
- Glenbow Museum
- MacKenzie Art Gallery
- The Robert McLaughlin Gallery
- McMaster Museum of Art
- Nickle Galleries, University of Calgary
- Winnipeg Art Gallery
