= Jennifer Fisher =

Jennifer Fisher may refer to:

- Jennifer Fisher (art historian), American contemporary art academic
- Jennifer Fisher (designer), American jewelry designer
- Jennifer Fisher (athlete) (born 1959), Bermudian runner
