= Australian patriotism =

Australian patriotism is patriotism involving cultural attachment of Australians to Australia as their homeland. Australian patriotism has been identified by some as distinct from Australian nationalism because of the emphasis of Australian patriotism upon values rather than a commitment to a nation.

According to the 2014 World Values Survey, over 90 per cent of Australians are either "very proud" or "quite proud" of their nation.

== See also ==
- Australophile
- Australian nationalism
- Australiana
- God's Own Country
- Reclaiming Patriotism
