= Judith Schwarz =

Canadian visual artist

- Born: 1944 (age 81–82); Vancouver, British Columbia
- Education: BA (UBC), MFA (York)

Judith Schwarz (born 1944) is a Canadian visual artist. Her work has been featured in exhibitions since 1979.

== Early life and education ==
Judith Schwarz was born 1944 in Vancouver, British Columbia and is based in Toronto, Ontario. She earned a Bachelor's degree from the University of British Columbia (1966), attended the Vancouver School of Art (1973–1976), and received a Master of Fine Arts degree from York University (1978).

== Career ==
Schwarz is an Associate Professor at York University in Toronto, where she teaches sculpture and drawing at both graduate and undergraduate levels. In 1978 she began her career at York University and in 1995 she received a full-time appointment to the Faculty of Fine Arts. Schwarz is known for her outdoor abstract sculptures, integrating art with the environment.

Schwarz's earliest sculptural exhibit, entitled Parallel Language (1987), was a three-part work juxtaposing a circular die-cut steel sheet wall mounted, angling out from it onto the floor—a steel beam, and a leaf shaped steel stencil next to a beautiful slab of oak. In a review written by Linda Genereux in Artforum, Genereux states "The strength of Judith Schwarz's work depends upon her dexterous handling of material and a growing vocabulary of forms..."

Her work can be found in many public collections across Canada and in the US, including the Canada Council Art Bank, the National Gallery of Canada, the Art Gallery of Ontario, the Art Gallery of Nova Scotia, Royal Bank of Canada, the University of Oregon and the York University. The National Gallery purchased two of her drawings in 1983: Low Light Drawing, Series A, #10 (1981) and Head Stand (1982); and then in 1987 purchased a set of four videotapes: I am an artist, My name is…, a collaboration between Schwarz and Elizabeth MacKenzie.

Schwarz has created public commissions in both Vancouver and Toronto, Canada. Among her commissions in Toronto are the Nautilus Gateway (1992), a stainless steel and bronze sculpture in Waterpark Place, Bay Street and Queen's Quay and Spiral Fountain (1990), a bronze fountain for the Hotel Deck at Skydome. Schwarz's sculpture Pacific Spiral (2003) was among 350 outdoor artworks celebrated in Vancouver during the 2014 Culture Days Celebration, as part of a national Culture Days campaign designed to promote artistic activities across Canada. In Francois-Marc Gagnon's description of Schwarz's sculptures in The Canadian Encyclopedia, Gagnon states

"..."the elegant, flame-cut steel cosmological configurations of Judith Schwarz invent rather than transform cultural signs and devices whose mysteries are embedded as much in the juxtaposition of the materials, glass, steel, and wood as in their form".

In 1990 at the 75th Anniversary of the Emily Awards, Schwarz was presented with an Emily Award. She was among the 75 distinguished alumni of Emily Carr Institute of Art and Design that were recognized for their outstanding career achievements.

The University of Waterloo Art Gallery circulated a 10-year retrospective of Schwarz's work, titled Dissembling Structures, curated by James D. Campbell. This exhibition was presented at the University of Waterloo Art Gallery, Waterloo (1998), the Concordia University's Leonard & Bina Ellen Art Gallery, Toronto (1998), and the Emily Carr Institute of Art and Design's Charles S. Scott Art Gallery, Vancouver (1999).

Schwarz was awarded the Victor Martyn Lynch-Staunton Award in Visual Arts by the Canada Council in 1998

== Selected exhibitions ==
- Recent Sculpture, Forest City Gallery, London, Ontario (1985)
- Shadow of the Palace, S.L. Simpson Gallery, Toronto, Ontario (1986)
- Reciprocation, The Gallery/Stratford, Stratford, Ontario(1989)
- Judith Schwarz, Art Gallery of Windsor, Windsor Ontario (1989); Art Gallery of York University; Toronto, Ontario (1990); Centennial Gallery, Oakville, Ontario (1991)
- Old Man River Exhibition, Southern Alberta Art Gallery, Lethbridge, Alberta (1991)
- Fictive Space Collaborative Exhibition with Arlene Stamp, Illingworth Kerr Gallery, Calgary, Alberta (1994)
- SCULPTURE/sculpture, S.L. Simpson Gallery, Toronto, Ontario (1996)
- Dissembling Structures/Structures dissimulees – a survey of Judith Schwarz sculpture 1989–1998, University of Waterloo Art Gallery, Waterloo, Ontario (1998); Helen & Bina Ellen Art Gallery - Concordia University, Montreal, Quebec (1998); and the Charles S. Scott Art Gallery - Emily Carr Institute of Art and Design, Vancouver, British Columbia (1999)
- Portal, two person exhibition with Schwarz and Carmelo Arnoldin, Koeffler Gallery, Toronto, Canada (2000)
- Judith Schwarz, Sable Castelli Gallery, Toronto, Ontario (2002)

== Selected bibliography ==
- Judith Schwarz: Heterodoxy, a club for unorthodox women. The radical feminists of Heterodoxy: Greenwich Village, 1912-1940. Thesis (M.A.), San Jose State University 1977
- Dewdney, Christopher; Stebbins, Joan (1986) Judith Schwarz (catalogue) Lethbridge, Canada: Southern Alberta Art Gallery
- Gallery/Stratford (1989) Reciprocation: Judith Schwarz (catalogue) Stratford, Canada: Gallery Stratford
- Arnold, Grant (1989) Judith Schwarz (catalogue) Windsor, Canada: Art Gallery of Windsor ISBN 0919837271
- Grenville, Bruce; Dewdney, Christopher (1990) S.L. Simpson Gallery, 1980-1990 (catalogue) Toronto, Canada: S.L. Simpson Gallery ISBN 189518200X
- McEvilley, Thomas (1995) Fictive Space Judith Schwarz and Arlene Stamp,(catalogue) Calgary, Canada: Illingworth Kerr Gallery of the Alberta College of Art and Design ISBN 189508640X
- Campbell, James D.; Wyatt, Joseph (1998) Dissembling Structures: a survey of Judith Schwarz sculpture, 1989-1998 (catalogue) Waterloo, Canada: University of Waterloo Art Gallery ISBN 0969382316
- Youngs, Christopher; Judith Schwarz: transcriptions - a travelogue (catalogue) Reading, USA: Freeman Gallery
