= Women in Focus =

Feminist film and video distribution centre and gallery in Vancouver, Canada

Women in Focus (WIF) was a feminist film and video distribution centre and gallery based in Vancouver, Canada. It operated from 1974 to 1992.

== History ==
Women in Focus was founded in September, 1974 and was originally based out of and funded by the University of British Columbia. Its original mandate was to "produce feminist video and film" as an "alternative to male-defined images of women was long overdue." In addition to producing a number of films and videos, including such notable titles as Fashion as a Social Control (1976) and Rape is a Social Disease (1975), WIF acted as a distributor of Canadian and International film and video made by women. The centre also operated a rental library of production and post-production materials, available to members of Women in Focus, and regularly organized workshops, screenings, trainings and conferences open to both members and the general public. From 1978 until 1986 Women in Focus hosted ephemeral visual arts programming in a variety of gallery spaces across Vancouver. In 1986 the Floating Curatorial Gallery, later called the Lateral Gallery, was founded and hosted year-round exhibitions.

Women in Focus was very active in policy making at the regional and national level, and participated in the National Action Committee on the Status of Women Comité canadien. Marion Barling, and as a result, Women in Focus, took a very strong anti-pornography stance, citing the perceived impossible reconciliation between feminism and porn.

One notable exhibition from the gallery's history is Drawing the Line, a photography exhibition by the Vancouver-based lesbian artist collective Kiss & Tell. This exhibition was the collective's first and most well-known work, which featured photographs of the female nude, representing a range of lesbian sex acts. Women viewers of the show were invited to write comments on the walls with black markers, creating a community activation on and alongside the imagery.

In 1989, Women in Focus was one of the sponsors of In Visible Colours, a ground-breaking international film and video festival made for and by women of colour and third world women. It also had a multi-day symposium on race and gender in the arts. In Visible Colours jumpstarted a national discussion around identity politics that continues to deeply affect Canadian cultural production and funding.

Though In Visible Colours concluded as a successful festival with big surplus, there was a rupture between In Visible Colours and Women in Focus leading to court litigation and subsequent dissolution. Nancy Pollock of Kinesis has done extensive reportage of this phase leading to the court decision in favour of In Visible Colours. In Visible Colours' first board of directors released a press statement highlighting the Court decision in their favour. The collapse of both these organizations in 1992 marked an end to the Vancouver’s women’s art community era.

The Women In Focus media collection, distribution records, print library, and assorted materials, were deposited with VIVO Media Arts Centre (then Video In) on their dissolution. Researchers can access these materials at VIVO's Crista Dahl Media Library & Archive.

== Notable members ==
Notable members of Women in Focus include original founders Jeanette A. Auger, Yvette Perreault, Nicola Sumners, Corinne Angell, Judy Morton and Marion Barling as well as Susan Moore, Jill Pollack, Julie Warren, Zainub Verjee, Michelle Nickel, Kem Windwraith, Venge Dixon, Sharon Costello, Judy Hayward, Syvi Kristman, and Marion Dodds.
