= Rebecca Huntley =

Australian author and social researcher

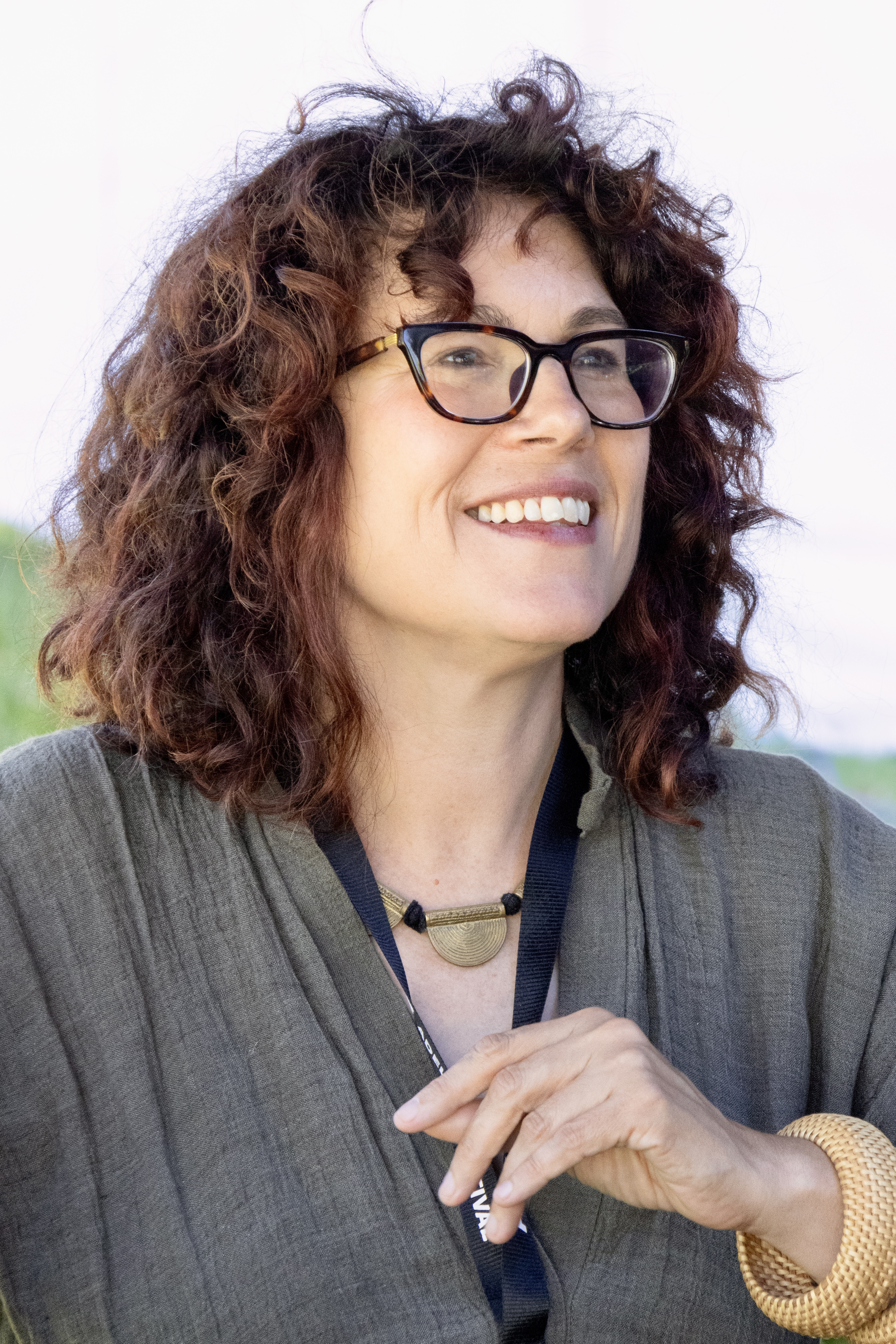
Huntley at the 2025 Adelaide Writers' Week

Rebecca Huntley is an Australian author and researcher on social trends. She holds degrees in law and film studies and a PhD in gender studies.

For nearly nine years Huntley was the Director of The Mind & Mood Report, Australia's longest-running social trends report. She led research at Essential Media Communications and Vox Populi, part of the CIRCA research group, before starting her own research and consultancy business. She works closely with The Sunrise Movement on the Climate Compass Project as well as with many other climate and environment NGOs, and regularly features on radio and TV.

== Early life and education ==
Huntley was born to schoolteacher Marisa Ballini Crawford and lawyer James Crawford in Oxford, England. She changed her name to Huntley at the age of 18. Until her early teenage years, she moved frequently between Adelaide, Sydney, Cambridge and Oxford.

Huntley attended secondary education at Sydney Girls High School, before studying law at the University of New South Wales, spending one year of her degree at the University of British Columbia. She also attained an honours degree in film studies, writing her thesis on the political debate around the un-banning of Pier Paolo Pasolini's controversial film Salo.

From 1997 to 2002, Huntley studied at the University of Sydney to obtain a PhD in Gender Studies. As part of her studies, she explored the campaign for the women’s vote and the Australian Labor Party (ALP) campaign in the 1983 and 1993 federal elections.

== Career ==
Huntley worked briefly in legal publishing before she attended the University of Sydney to obtain her PhD. During this period, she worked with several federal politicians in the ALP, acting as an active member of the National Committee of EMILY's List Australia and the ALP's federal policy committee. Simultaneously, she worked as an academic, teaching public law, film studies, politics and communication part-time. Huntley left the ALP in 2006, saying that she wished to be politically neutral in her research. Huntley is a committed republican and worked for the YES campaign during the 1999 Australian republic referendum.

She was the director of The Mind & Mood Report at Ipsos Australia, a market research firm, from 2006 to 2015. Huntley worked as the director of research at Essential Media and was a principal at Vox Populi Research.

She is or has been an adjunct senior lecturer at the School of Social Sciences at University of New South Wales.

Under her own climate research and consultancy business, Huntley published a report for Aware Super in early 2021 outlining how Australia could recover from the COVID-19 pandemic by focussing on the intersections of climate action, health and wellbeing, and thriving communities.

== Broadcasting ==
Huntley was a broadcaster with the ABC Radio National and presented The History Listen and Drive on a Friday.

In 2015 she co-hosted a weekly podcast called Just Between Us with journalist Sarah Macdonald. In 2016 Huntley produced and presented a podcast series for the digital radio station Kinderling, called Where Parents Fear to Tread.

She has a regular spot on James Valentine's show on ABC702 in Sydney called Research or Rubbish.

In 2016 Huntley co-hosted with Sarah Macdonald a comedy storytelling night and podcast called The Full Catastrophe. The Full Catastrophe later became a book (2019).

She has written and presented two episodes of RN's Future Tense, on climate change and food and ageing and food. She presented at MAD Syd in 2017 with Rene Redzepi and David Chang, and is on the Advisory Group of MAD Sydney.

== Writing ==
Huntley is the author of numerous books, including How to Talk About Climate Change in a Way that Makes a Difference (2020), Still Lucky: why you should feel optimistic about Australia and its people (2017) and Australia Fair: Listen to the Nation, the first Quarterly Essay for 2019. She authored her first book, The World According to Y: Inside the New Adult Generation (2006) while working in politics and publishing.

She has researched the social and political dimensions of food and cooking throughout her career and has published on these topics in books and articles.

Huntley writes occasionally for The Guardian and co-presented the Guardian’s podcast Common Ground with Lenore Taylor in 2017. She has also written for numerous other publications, including The Australian, The Sydney Morning Herald, Marie Claire and Griffith Review. She has been a regular columnist for Business Review Weekly and ABC Life and was a feature writer for Australian Vogue from 2004 to 2012.

== Other activities ==
In 2006, Huntley gave the National Republican Lecture in Canberra with a talk entitled Trust Matters: Politics, Trust and the Republican Cause.

In 2013, she appeared at TEDxSydney, talking about truth in social research. In 2015 she delivered the John Button Oration at the Melbourne Writers Festival, and the MSSI Oration at the University of Melbourne in 2019. In 2017, Huntley hosted a panel discussion on the present and future of the nation for the Brisbane Writers Festival at the State Library of Queensland.

In 2023, she gave the Talbot Oration at the Australian Museum, titled "Inspiring Visions for a Climate Solution".

She has been a regular guest at the Festival of Dangerous Ideas and numerous writers' festivals across Australia. She has also appeared as a guest on many television shows, including Q&A, Gruen Planet, The Drum, Meet the Press, Paul Murray Live, and One Plus One.

Huntley has held board positions on the Whitlam Institute and Dusseldorp Forum, and was a member of the UNSW Arts and Social Sciences Advisory Committee. She is on the board of the Bell Shakespeare Company and on the executive board of the NSW branch of the Australian Labor Party.

As of November 2024 she is chair of the advisory board of Parents for Climate (formerly Australian Parents for Climate Action).

== Bibliography ==
- Huntley, Rebecca (1995). Censuring Salo: the unbanning of Pier Paolo Pasolini's Salo (Honours thesis). University of New South Wales.
- Kate Deverall, Rebecca Huntley, Penny Sharpe & Jo Tilly (eds), Party Girls: Labor Women Now (Pluto Press, 2000)
- Janet Ramsey & Rebecca Huntley, "Never Made to Follow, Never Born to Lead": Women in the NSW ALP in Deborah Brennan & Louise A. Chappell (eds), "No Fit Place For Women"? Women in New South Wales Politics, 1856-2006 (UNSW Press, 2006)
- Rebecca Huntley, The World According to Y: Inside the New Adult Generation (Allen & Unwin, 2006)
- Rebecca Huntley, Eating Between the Lines: Food and Equality in Australia (Black Inc, 2008)
- Rebecca Huntley, Serious Hair in Suzanne Boccalatte & Meredith Jones (eds), Trunk Vol One: Hair (Boccalatte Make Books, 2010)
- — (Autumn 2010). "A taste of home". Reportage. Griffith Review. 27: 81–85.
- Rebecca Huntley, The Italian Girl (UQ Press, 2012)
- Rebecca Huntley, A Most Generous Act in Suzanne Boccalatte & Meredith Jones (eds), Trunk Vol Two: Blood (Boccalatte Make Books, 2013)
- Rebecca Huntley, Does Cooking Matter? (Penguin, 2014)
- Rebecca Huntley, Nonna's Gnocchi (Little People Publishing, 2014)
- Rebecca Huntley, 'Bending Over Backwards' in Griffith REVIEW 45: The Way We Work (2014)
- Verity Firth & Rebecca Huntley, Who's Afraid of a Public School? Public Perceptions of Education in Australia (2014)
- Rebecca Huntley, Still Lucky: why you should feel optimistic about Australia and its people (Penguin, 2017)
- Rebecca Huntley, "Australia Fair: Listening to the Nation" (Quarterly Essay, 2019)
- Huntley, Rebecca (2 July 2020). How to talk about climate change in a way that makes a difference. Murdoch Books, an imprint of Allen & Unwin. ISBN 978-1-76052-536-1.
- Rebecca Huntley, Sassafras - A memoir of love, loss and MDMA therapy (Hachette UK, 2024)
