= Reclaiming Patriotism =

2009 book by Tim Soutphommasane

Reclaiming Patriotism: Nation-Building for Australian Progressives
- Author: Tim Soutphommasane
- Language: English
- Series: Australian encounters
- Genre: Politics
- Publisher: Cambridge University Press
- Publication date: 2009
- Publication place: Australia
- ISBN: 9780521134729
- OCLC: 1450013999

Reclaiming Patriotism: Nation-Building for Australian Progressives is a 2009 book by Tim Soutphommasane published by Cambridge University Press. It's the lead title of the Australian Encounters series which argues that the Australian left have misunderstood patriotism and should embrace it in order to re-engage with political discourse and ordinary Australians.

== Content ==
=== Introduction ===
In the introduction to his book, Soutphommasane argues that patriotism is important and relevant to the modern era for three reasons. The first is the challenge of solidarity, which refers to the need for Australian people to have a common unifying identity in an era of multiculturalism and diversity. Secondly, Soutphommasane says that progressives must avoid intellectual complacency about national discourses and instead engage in such conversations in order to explain how Australia is today and to challenge the Australian right's dominance in this area. Thirdly is the importance for the left of articulating a positive cultural vision of their own in order to become more influential and persuasive advocates of their cause.

=== Chapter 1 – The dog whistle excuse ===
The first chapter deals with how progressives in Australia have come to interpret all appeals to nationalism and Australianness as merely being ‘dog whistles’ to racist Australians who pick up the prejudiced undertones of such messages. According to Soutphommasane, Australian leftists are wrong to think this way because the majority of Australians love Australia, and patriotism need not be racist or based on exclusion. Soutphommasane also says that such effortless dismissals of patriotic sentiments hinder the left's ability to understand and connect with the broader Australian population.

=== Chapter 2 - Liberal patriotism and an Australian tradition ===
Chapter 2 explores whether left liberal values of universalism and compassion for all human beings are compatible with patriotism, which feels a higher level of connection with people of the same country. Soutphommasane argues that the left side of politics in Australia used to be patriotic, but that this declined in the 1960s and has given way to a suspicion of nationalistic feelings. The author concludes that there no necessary contradiction. Soutphommasane writes that "A distinctive brand of egalitarianism, a robust democracy supported by an Anzac myth – these are the foundations of an Australian patriotism". He also argues that progressive criticisms of Australia and its history are compatible with patriotism as a more sophisticated love of one's country involves acknowledging its faults as well as celebrating its virtues.

=== Chapter 3 - Citizenship and multiculturalism ===
This chapter firstly deals with how the Anzac tradition can be shared by new Australians, whose ancestors were neither Anzacs not Australians. According to Soutphommasane (who is himself of Chinese and Laotian extraction), "while I am unable to claim direct lineage back to Anzac, the whole legend can still resonate for me because I can relate to the mateship and the egalitarianism".

Issues concerning the White Australia Policy and multiculturalism are then explored. Soutphommasane advocates a ‘liberal middle ground on diversity’ which values expressions of cultural identity insofar as they contribute to individual autonomy or social cohesion.

The rest of the chapter questions whether dual citizenship should be permissible, given that it would make some citizens out of convenience, rather than love of country.

=== Chapter 4 - Australian progressives and nation-building ===
This chapter deals with the concept of nation building, which Soutphommasane laments has become synonymous with infrastructure in political discourse. Nevertheless, Soutphommasane praises Kevin Rudd's use of the term and outlines how progressive politics involves a more activist government which builds bridges, roads, rails, high speed broadband and other public works. But to Soutphommasane, the concept of nation building extends beyond just infrastructure and also involves civics and solidarity within a nation. An applied patriotism is also required.

=== Chapter 5 - Republican renewal ===
This chapter deals with the debate of whether or not Australia should move from a monarchy to a republic. According to Soutphommasane, it is regrettable that both sides of the debate view the issue as being purely symbolic. Soutphommasane writes that:

A republic denotes a political community rooted in the popular will of citizens and conducted for the common good; it denotes a society in which people govern themselves, through elected representatives, and on the basis that every member of society is of equal standing. A monarchy, in its most literal sense, means 'the rule of one'. Those who belong to a community governed by a monarch are not citizens, but are subjects of a monarch who attains office by virtue of birthright. The connection between a republic and patriotism should be clear. Monarchical government is in a basic sense antithetical to patriotic citizenship.

=== Chapter 6 - Reclaiming patriotism ===
The final chapter is a part summary part conclusion for the entire book. Soutphommasane observes that patriotism has increased in Australia in recent years, as events such as Australia Day in Sydney demonstrate. Soutphommasane argues that whilst patriotism has its dangers, "it is no different to other forms of loyalty or love". He opines that patriotism is necessary for a thriving nation, as serves to form bonds between people which promote progress, direction and collective self-improvement. Soutphommasane writes that:

People should be able to express national pride without being racist, while at the same time being able to criticise parts of the national story without being labelled un-Australian.

The book concludes with a restating of the need for progressives to re-think patriotism as an instrument of progress.

== Reviews ==
The book received high praise from Bob Carr, the Australian Literary Review, The Australian, the Sydney Morning Herald and The Age. However, Crikey! writer Guy Rundle described Reclaiming Patriotism as a "strange book" which reveals an "obsession with social control " and a desire to "legislate against the complex network of chauvinism and cultural privilege that makes up much of patriotism". Writes Rundle:

Soutphommasane has his own complex history, which suggests various reason why such a curiously contentless and lifeless alternative to real countrylove and social solidarity might appeal to him — the aspiring dreamer amid the dreaming spires of Oxford has simply reprised the act of Petrach and the first nationalists — the Renaissance thinkers who invented nationalism from their student clubs ("the nations") and then projected them back onto the regions they came from.

Mark Bahnisch, agreeing with Rundle, made the following comment on his blog Larvatus Prodeo:

it doesn’t represent a viable political strategy for the left, for a whole range of reasons, including the basic failure whereby a project which transforms the social and the cultural cannot be substituted for by a fairly empty civics.

== Awards ==
This book has not received any awards but had been nominated.

Shortlisted for the Community Relations Award in NSW Premier's Literary Awards in 2010.

Longlisted John Button Prize 2010.
