= Cassandra Wilkinson =

Australian author

Cassandra Wilkinson is an Australian public servant and author and the former president and co-founder of FBi Radio. She is married to former Australian politician Paul McLeay.

== Writing career ==
Wilkinson was a columnist for the newspaper The Australian. She wrote Don't Panic – Nearly Everything is Better Than You Think, published by Pluto Press in 2007. and The Kids Are Alright – 10 Good Reasons to Relax and Let Kids Be Kids. She has made presentations at the Sydney Writers' Festival and the Festival of Dangerous Ideas. She has written individual chapters on happiness economics in Happiness (Spinney Press, 2008) and on effective programs for the poor in Right Social Justice (Connor Court, 2012). She contributed to So You Want to Be a Leader.

She was regular commentator for Sky News Agenda, The Bolt Report and ABC's The Drum. She was featured in Best Australian Science Writing 2012 (UNSW Press). She has written on innovation in public policy in The Three Sector Solution (ANU 2014). Wilkinson's play After Dinner Mince was performed at the Sydney Fringe Festival Big Competition for Little Plays in 1998.

== Career ==
Wilkinson is an executive at NSW Treasury. Wilkinson previously worked for Social Finance Pty Ltd, a start-up social impact bonds broker. She was a senior public servant and senior political adviser to the New South Wales Treasurer and other Labor ministers.

Cassandra Wilkinson is co-owner of Lazy Thinking Records. She is a member of the board of the Special Broadcasting Service (SBS). She is a current board member and former Vice President of the Council for Civil Liberties. Cassandra was one of the founding members of FBi Radio and served as President from 1997 to 2021.

Wilkinson was a freight expert, holding the position of Director, Rail and Freight Policy in the New South Wales Ministry of Transport. She was made redundant from this position in January 2009, following the New South Wales government decision to axe executive positions. She was a director in the Economics practice of Deloitte Touche Tohmatsu before returning to work for Premier Kristina Keneally until the defeat of the Labor government in March 2011.

In addition to being a founder and president of FBi FM, she was a director of Music NSW and of the Human Capital Project, a charity that provides personal equity loans to poor students in Cambodia. She was previously vice president of the Community Broadcasting Association of Australia and a director of Sydney City Farm. From 2016 to 2022, she was a committee member and Treasurer of the Inner West Roller Derby League.

In July 2026, Wilkinson was appointed acting chief operating officer of the Powerhouse Museum.

== Honours and recognition ==
Wilkinson was awarded the Medal of the Order of Australia in the 2024 King's Birthday Honours for "service to the broadcast media, and to the community".
