= Bradley Garrett =

American social and cultural geographer

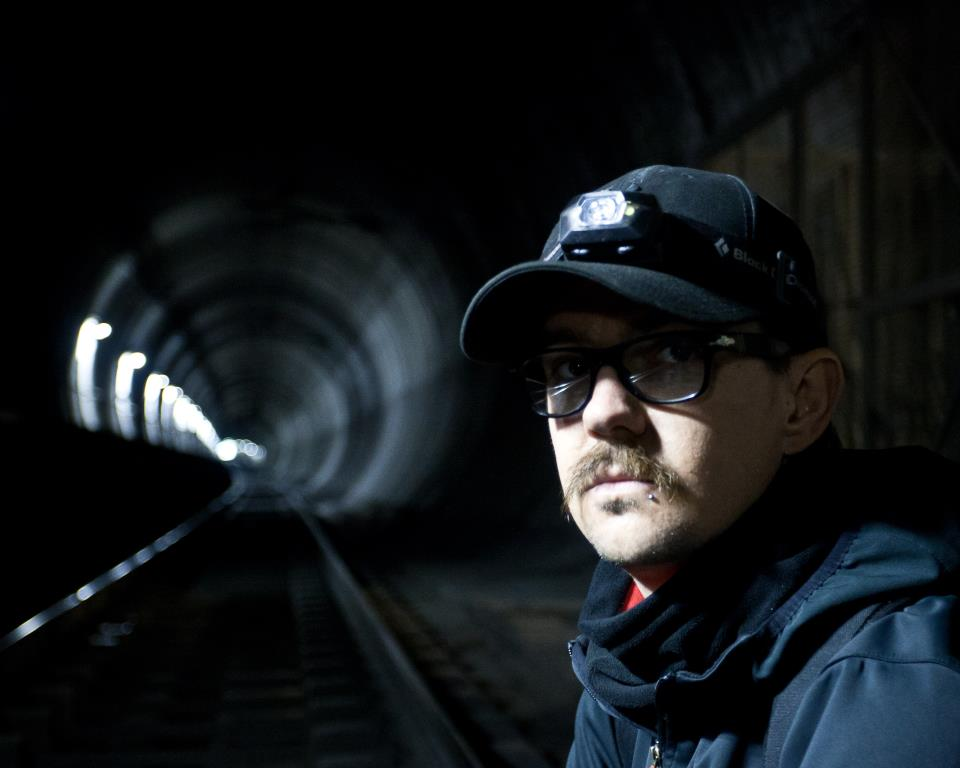
Bradley L. Garrett

Bradley Garrett (born January 4, 1981) is an American geographer, writer, and photographer.

Garrett is an honorary fellow in the School of Geosciences at the University of Sydney in Australia, but lives in Morongo Valley, California. He also has a bug out cabin in Big Bear Lake, California.

His research interests are in social and cultural geography, archaeology and visual methods. He is the author of five books including Bunker: Building for the End Times, a contemporary account of doomsday prepping practices, and Explore Everything: Place-Hacking the City, an ethnographic account of the activities of the London Consolidation Crew, a group of urban explorers Garrett calls "place hackers". He has written for several newspapers and magazines, including The Atlantic, Vox, GQ, the Daily Beast, and The Guardian.

== Education ==
Garrett received a B.S. in anthropology and B.A. in history from the University of California, Riverside in 2003. He pursued an MSc in maritime archaeology from James Cook University in 2005, and a PhD in social and cultural geography at Royal Holloway, University of London in 2008. His thesis was entitled Tales of Urban Exploration and was supervised by Tim Cresswell.

During his master's degree, he did ethnographic research with the Winnemem Wintu tribe in Northern California about their loss of access to ancestral land inundated by the construction of Shasta Dam. He then worked for private archaeology firms in Hawaii and for the Bureau of Land Management in California as an archaeologist.

== Career ==
After completing his PhD, Garrett held a two-year postdoctoral research post at School of Geography and the Environment, University of Oxford from 2012 to 2014, where he was a fellow of Wolfson College, Oxford. He then worked for two years at the University of Southampton before moving to the University of Sydney in Australia, where he was a research fellow. While in Sydney, he conducted ethnographic research with "doomsday preppers" building for apocalyptic scenarios. His last academic position was with University College Dublin in Ireland.

His first book is Explore Everything: Place-Hacking the City. The book was chosen by Rowan Moore of The Guardian as one of the best architecture books of 2013. Garrett claims the goal of this work was to re-map London by opening out vertical urban imaginations and exposing the ways in which surveillance and control are embedded in modern spatial planning. Garrett was also invited to speak about his research at the Festival of Dangerous Ideas at the Sydney Opera House and at Google Zeitgeist in 2014, where he shared a session with Bill Clinton. He also wrote a column for The Guardian about the dangers of privatizing of public space. Near the end of his research project, Garrett followed an urban exploration group that systematically infiltrated abandoned Tube stations in the London Underground without permission and posted photos online.

In 2015, Garrett was the recipient of the James Cook University Early Career Alumni Award for the College of Arts, Society and Education in Queensland, Australia.

In February 2016 Garrett, along with writer Will Self, Green Party mayoral candidate Siân Berry, writer Anna Minton and comedian Mark Thomas, staged a trespass onto land owned by property group More London in protest of the privatization of public space in the city. The group occupied a private amphitheater called The Scoop and held an unsanctioned 2-hour event for a crowd of people. As a result of this campaigning, the Mayor of London, Sadiq Khan, established a charter regulating the management of privately owned public spaces in the capital.

In 2016, Garrett also released a virtual reality project built in collaboration with The Guardian called "Underworld", which allows users to venture through the "lost" Fleet River under London, guided by Garrett.

Garrett has also been featured on Guardian Cities and the BBC.

In 2017, Garrett began a three-year research fellowship at the University of Sydney, which involved embedding himself with doomsday prepper communities around the world who were preparing for a global disaster. The resulting book, published in 2020, in first few months of the COVID-19 pandemic, was completed with eerie timeliness, according to writer Robert Macfarlane. The book received positive reviews from US and UK media outlets.

In July 2020, as part of the launch of Bunker: Building for the End Times, Garrett was a guest on The Joe Rogan Experience hosted by Joe Rogan. In the interview, Garrett revealed that he had purchased a forest cabin in Big Bear Lake, California, where he'd begun to stockpile supplies for widespread social, political, or environmental breakdown. In 2022, Garrett was interviewed at the cabin for 60 Minutes by John Wertheim. In 2023, Garrett purchased a 5-acre ranch near Joshua Tree, California, once owned by western movie star Rory Calhoun. Garrett now works as a freelance writer between Morongo Valley and Big Bear Lake and hosts the survivalist-themed Tenacity Podcast, produced by the French video game company Ubisoft.

== Books ==
- Explore Everything: Place-Hacking the City (2013)
- Subterranean London: Cracking the Capital (2014)
- London Rising: Illicit Photos from the City's Heights (2016)
- Global Undergrounds: Exploring Cities Within (2016)
- Bunker: Building for the End Times (2020)

In addition, Garrett has authored over 50 academic publications, including journal articles and book chapters.

== Controversy ==
Garrett has been criticized for being too close to his project participants and failing to maintain objective distance as a researcher. He was once engaged to one of his project participants, the British artist Lucy Sparrow. In 2011, four of his project participants were arrested inside the London Tube on Easter. Garrett himself was later also arrested at Heathrow Airport by British Transport Police investigating the group's means of access to abandoned Tube stations. Criminal property damage charges against Garrett concluded with a three-year conditional discharge and a £2000 fine being issued by the court. Garrett claims that he does ethnography in the tradition of the Chicago school and argued that his actions were necessary to understand a culture fully.

Writer Will Self defended Garrett and the urban explorers, writing in the London Evening Standard that "place-hackers are performing a valuable service by reminding us that the city should, in principle, belong to its citizens" University of Oxford Halford Mackinder Professor of Geography Professor Danny Dorling also spoke out at the end of the case, contending that the prosecution had been a fundamental breach of academic liberty. In an interview with The Guardian in 2016, Garrett claimed that the purpose of his prosecution was to subject "trauma" onto him and his colleagues, in order to prevent further publication on the issue, which he believed "undermined their narrative of security."

A 2018 European Ethics Framework published by PRO-RES suggested that Garrett's research was ethically problematic.

== Popular references ==
In the 2015 book of short stories Three Moments of an Explosion: Stories by China Miéville, the character Infiltrex is based on Garrett.

In the 2017 book The Last London by Iain Sinclair, Sinclair writes about how Garrett and friends in London had been busy constructing a network of illegal structures they called "urban bothies". Sinclair writes that "They are bivouacs, where people are free to rest, write, eat, sleep, disguised by black paint and a padlock. They look like any other workman's hut, within the dead zones of some of the most secure and spooked enclaves in the City of London."

In the 2019 book Underland: A Deep Time Journey by Robert Macfarlane (writer), part of the chapter entitled "Invisible Cities" is based around Macfarlane's explorations with Garrett underground in London and Wales. Macfarlane also describes acting as a character witness in Garrett's trial with the London Consolidation Crew. Garrett is also a character in the 2025 Underland documentary directed by Rob Petit for Sandbox Films.
