= Business Today (Australian TV program) =

- Genre: news
- Presented by: Whitney Fitzsimmons
- Country of origin: Australia
- Original language: English
- No. of seasons: 3

Production
- Running time: 30 minutes

Original release
- Network: Australia Network (Asia); ABC News 24 (Australia)
- Release: August 2006 – 2014

Business Today is an Asian-Pacific television program, which began airing on the Asia-pacific channel Australia Network in August 2006, and on ABC News 24 (Australia) on 23 July 2010. It is hosted by Whitney Fitzsimmons. The program provides daily rundowns of Australian, Australasian, and International economies, as well as commentaries on financial and political outcomes.
