= Fictocriticism =

Postmodern style of blended writing

Fictocriticism [also appearing as ficto-criticism] is a postmodern style of writing which can be described as "Gonzo [in reference to the journalism style] Anthropology". Blending fact and fiction, ethnographic observation, archival history, literary theory and memoir.

Professor Carl Rhodes defines fictocriticism as "a writing engaged in genre-bending as a literary and theoretical engagement with existence and selfhood." It is a new sub-categorization and therefore still being defined and redefined.

The tradition of division among the practices of fiction, theory and criticism into single narrative stories, essays and critiques tends to merge in fictocriticism which combines elements into a single text. These texts thus often tell a story while making an argument. They range from avant-garde prose poetry to discursive meta-fictional inventions.

Once Jacques Derrida asked for a name:

We must invent a name for those "critical" inventions which belong to literature while deforming its limits.

The source for the term ficto-criticism, however, is the cultural critic, author, performance artist and psychiatrist Jeanne Randolph. An exchange between Andrea Ward and Fredric Jameson in an interview appearing in the 1987 issue of Toronto's Impulse Magazine (volume 13, number 4) points to already active use of the term:

Andrea Ward: Do you think that the nature of 'ficto-criticism' is successful in undermining the 'corrective' power of criticism? Fredric Jameson: 'Ficto-criticism' makes a lot of sense to me. It is very clear that there has been a flowing together of theory and criticism.

As discussed by Helen Flavell in "Who killed Jeanne Randolph? King, Muecke or ficto-criticism'" (published May 2009 in Outskirts, an online journal of The University of Western Australia, that existed between May 1996 and November 2009), Andrea Ward’s "familiarity with ficto-criticism can be explained by the fact that she was a student at the Ontario Centre for Arts (OCA), where Randolph was a teacher, and that several years prior to Ward’s interview with Jameson Randolph’s writing on local visual arts had already been described as ficto-critical. Put another way, the term was already in circulation in Canada and Jameson was merely responding to a question that made reference to it."

Fictocritical tendencies might trace their origins to Montaigne, continuing through Barthes and making a different appearance in the New Journalism of Tom Wolfe or Joan Didion. Tending towards the laid-back narrative, the inclusion of the local and singular; the embrace of contemporary culture and media, the name, and the style, have been adopted enthusiastically in Australia and Canada.

Fictocriticism may also take alternative forms, such as art work. Artists such as Patricia Piccinini have been described as operating in a fictocritical dialogue, creating fictional futuristic creatures and companion species of a possible future.

A prominent practitioner of fictocriticism today is Michael Taussig, an anthropologist currently working at Columbia University, who lectures on the subject of fictocriticism extensively.

== In popular culture ==
The 2015 romantic comedy film Maggie's Plan features two university professors, portrayed by Ethan Hawke and Julianne Moore, who produce fictocritical essays and books.

== See also ==
- Anthropology
- Gonzo Journalism
- Field Research
- Linguistics
- Literary theory
- Post Modernism
