= Perv: The Sexual Deviant in All of Us =

- First edition cover
- Author: Jesse Bering
- Language: English
- Publisher: Straus & Giroux
- Publication date: 2013
- Pages: 265
- ISBN: 978-0-374-23089-0

Perv: The Sexual Deviant in All of Us is a popular science book by psychology professor Jesse Bering. It is an overview on the broad range of human sexuality from an evolutionary, cultural, medical, and historical perspective, with an emphasis on social perceptions of normalcy and deviance and how these are shaped. It was published in 2013 by Scientific American / Farrar, Straus, & Giroux.

The book focuses on Bering's contention that "‘sexual deviancy’ is in fact far less deviant than most of us assume." The premise of the book is aimed at challenging common misconceptions about the topic, and increasing understanding about human sexual desires, in turn reducing societal stigma. It covers a wide array of topics, including paraphilias and other atypical patterns of erotic attraction, sex differences in arousal, and moral judgment. Bering emphasizes the importance of harm-reduction strategies in mitigating sexual abuse.

== Reception ==
Perv received generally favorable reviews. Critics praised Bering’s engaging prose and compassionate effort to destigmatize taboo desires through science. Michael Washburn, The Boston Globe called Bering a 'supple, witty writer' and praised his humane treatment of unconventional sexual interests. Some reviewers noted the occasional blurring of academic data with anecdotes and questioned the author’s tone and humour. The book was named a New York Times Book Review Editors’ Choice and received a starred review from Publisher’s Weekly. A review in Sexual and Relationship Therapy described the book as "one of those rare books that will forever change how you look at yourself and those around you".
