= Zainub Verjee =

Kenyan-born Canadian artist (born 1956)

Zainub Verjee CM
- Born: 1956 (age 69–70); Nairobi, Kenya
- Education: BA, Business Administration and Economics, Simon Fraser University
- Website: Official website

Zainub Verjee CM, (born in 1956) is a Kenyan-born, Canadian video artist, curator, writer, and administrator.

== Biography ==
Born in Nairobi in 1956, Verjee is a fourth generation Kenyan. She moved to Canada in the 1970s to study economics at Simon Fraser University.

== Career ==
In the 1990s, she worked for a decade as the executive director of the Western Front Society in Vancouver. She was also known to have been an active arts administrator in the field of cultural policy and cultural diplomacy for over 30 years. These decades of work in the sector led to boarding and committee appointments, and speaking invitations on national and international forums.

In addition to holding positions at Women in Focus, Citizen’s Forum on Canada’s Future -The Spicer Commission, Canada Council for the Arts, and Department of Canadian Heritage, she was engaged by Gordon Campbell, Canadian diplomat and the 35th Mayor of Vancouver on his Vancouver Arts Initiative. Verjee's board of appointment started the B.C. Arts Board leading to the formation of B.C. Arts Council.

In the 1980s-2000, she worked on cultural policy work in Canada and internationally on issues of artist labour, racial equity and culture trade. She was appointed in 2017 as the Director of the International Art Gallery at the Jubilee International Arts Festival in Lisbon. Appointed in 2015, Verjee is currently the executive director of the Ontario Association of Art Galleries.

Verjee has been embedded in the history of women’s labour in British Columbia.

She co-authored a letter, on behalf of 75000 artists, to the Prime Minister of Canada on the issue of Basic Income. This paved the way for her to head a movement on the cause of Artists' Basic Income, which has become an international issue.

In the summer of 2021, she had a solo show Speech Acts at Centre A:Vancouver International Centre for Contemporary Asian Art.

She was Film Distribution Manager at the Women in Focus Society, Vancouver. She was involved with the British Black Arts Movement of the 1980s. Verjee offered the connecting link between the Black British Art Movement and Vancouver. In 1989 Verjee cofounded In Visible Colours with Lorraine Chan of the National Film Board, an international film and video festival and symposium featuring the work of women of colour. At the Courtauld Institute of Art in a keynote on In Visible Colours as an experiment in solidarity, Third cinema, women and birth of an aesthetic she spoke of as a witness to the unfolding of the decolonization process. It was the same time period when a new Afro-Asian solidarity emerged in the form of the Bandung Conference—a counter to the West, and a non- Western basis for organizing a non-alignment front to counter the Cold War. Following the success of In Visible Colours, she was invited by the Jeanne Sauvé Youth Foundation to lead a workshop on International Forum 1992: globalization and nationalism at the first International Conference for Young Leaders, Montreal. In 1992 she was awarded National Film Board Fellowship as part of New Initiatives in Film for women of colour and aboriginal women.

She led the Artists' Coalition for Local Colour, raising racism charges against the Vancouver Art Gallery.

She was appointed as a Member of the Order of Canada in 2023. She lives in Mississauga and Vancouver.

She was contributor to a special double issue of the Capilano Review.

== Art Career ==
Her artworks have been shown at the Venice Biennale, Museum of Modern Art, NY, Portland Institute of Contemporary Art, Portland US, Centre d’Art Contemporain de Basse-Normandie, France, Museo de Arte Carrillo Gil, México, D. F. (Mexico City, Mexico), M.S.U. Baroda, India, Embassy Cultural House, London, Art Gallery of Alberta and resides in private and public collections (Vancouver Art Gallery, Canada).

=== Selected exhibitions ===
- 1993, Racy-Sexy: Race, Culture and Sexuality, Centre A, Vancouver.
- 1994, New Canadian Video, Museum of Modern Art, New York, NY.
- 1995, TransCulture, Venice Biennale, Venice, Italy.
- 1997, Traversing Territory, Part II: Road Movies in a Post-Colonial Landscape, Portland Institute of Contemporary Art, Portland, OR.
- 1997, Tracing Cultures III, Ismaili Jamatkhana and Centre, Burnaby, BC.
- Anon. The Instability of the Feminist Subject : A Series of 20 Postcards by Artists. Banff, Alta: [The Banff Centre for the Arts], 1992.DOSSIER: 321 - BANFF CENTRE FOR THE ARTS, The (Banff, Alta)
- Paterson, Andrew J.. Time, Space & Realities : An Exhibition of Video Tapes by John Orentlicher, Doug Porter, Catherine Richards, Janice Tanaka, Zainub Verjee. Toronto, Ont.: A Space, 1995.
- Cron, Marie-Michèle. Circonvolutions. Montréal, Qc: Opera, 1995.DOSSIER: 390 - OPERA : OUVERTURE PANCULTURELLE POUR L'ÉCHANGE ET LA RÉALISATION DE L'ART / PANCULTURAL OVERTURE FOR EXCHANGE AND REALIZATION OF ART (Montréal, Qc)
- Kibbins, Gary and Philip, Marlene Nourbese and Campbell, Colin and Barber, Bruce and Christakos, Margaret and Paterson, Andrew James and McLeod, Kathy and Shaw, Nancy and Jeffries, Pat and McCormack, Thelma and Robertson, Clive and Diamond, Sara and Harry, Isobel and Adams, Don and Bean, Robert and Norman, Abigail and Sullivan, Joan and Waterson, Georgia and Yael, B. H. and Amis, Ric and The Ontario Coalition for Abortion Clinics. Fuse 11: 3. Fall. (1987).
- Anon. Video Out Distribution Catalogue. Vancouver, BC: Satellite Video Exchange Society, 1996. DOSSIER: 390 - SATELLITE VIDEO EXCHANGE SOCIETY (Video Inn + Video Out, Vancouver, BC)
- Anon. 1996 Video Reference Guide Catalogued by V/Tape. Toronto, Ont.: V Tape, 1996. DOSSIER: 390 - VTAPE (Toronto, Ont.)
- Henry, Karen and Fife, Connie and Albahari, David and Jamal, Sherazad and Suleman, Zool and Xiao-ping, Li and Thomson, Grace Eiko. Tracing Cultures. Burnaby, BC: Burnaby Art Gallery, 1997. DOSSIER: 353 - BURNABY ART GALLERY (Burnaby)

In 1993 Verjee presented Ecoute s'il pleut (Listen if it's Raining), a French/English video poem to allow the viewer to experience the fullness of silence.

- Zainub Verjee, "Tautology 45", 2020, digital Image, Embassy Cultural House.
- Group Exhibition, 2020 Governor General's Award Visual and Media Arts, Art Gallery of Alberta.
- Group Exhibition, 2020 Redacted Artist Labour The Royal Society of Canada (RSC) and University of Alberta online project.

The Engaging Creativities: Art in the Pandemic.

- 2021 Solo Show, Speech Acts:Zainub Verjee at Centre A.
- 2021 Group Exhibition, Asian Triennial Manchester.

== Honours ==
In February 2020 she was awarded the 2020 Governor General’s Award in Visual and Media Arts for “outstanding contribution to the arts”. In 2021 she was conferred an honorary doctorate by the OCAD University recognizing her outstanding contribution to arts, racial and gender equity She was elected as a Senior Fellow of the Massey College at University of Toronto in the fall of 2021. Earlier she was appointed as McLaughlin College Fellow at the York University. In 2022, she was conferred Doctor of Fine Arts, honoris causa, by Nova Scotia College of Art and Design NSCAD University, Halifax She was the recipient of the honorary degree of Doctor of Fine Arts given by Simon Fraser University, Burnaby in the Spring Convocation of 2023. Her contribution to the pioneering prison theatre program in Canada and for integral role in the formation of the British Columbia Arts Council was recognized by University of Victoria by conferring her with an honorary degree of Doctor of Fine Arts in Spring Convocation in 2023.
