= Jeanne Randolph =

Jeanne Randolph (born 1943) is a cultural critic, author, performance artist and psychiatrist whose work explores the relationship between art and psychoanalytic theory. She was the first writer in Canada to develop Object Relations psychoanalytic theory as a medium for cultural criticism. She introduced "ficto-criticism" In 1983 as an unprecedented method for exploring the relationship between writing and an artist's work. In universities and galleries across Canada, England, Australia and Spain she has spoken on topics ranging from the aesthetics of Barbie dolls to the philosophy of Wittgenstein.

== Books ==
Dr. Jeanne Randolph is the author of Shopping Cart Pantheism (2015), Joanne Todd (1989, currently out of print), Psychoanalysis & Synchronized Swimming and Other Writings on Art (1991), Symbolism and its Discontents (1997), Why Stoics Box (2006) and Ethics of Luxury: Materialism and Imagination (2007), and co-author of Semble: Lyn Carter, Ginette Legaré & Jeannie Thib. She has contributed essays to books about art and artists including Subconscious City, Susan Kealey: Ordinary Marvel and Robbin Deyo: Sweet Sensation among others.

== Performances ==
Randolph's lectures evolved into performances that have been presented in venues including the Dunlop Art Gallery's Space Camp (2000), the Banff Centre for the Arts (2004), Gallery 1.1.1 (2008), The Klondike Institute for Arts & Culture (2009, Dawson City, Yukon). They have been described as, "extemporaneous soliloquies [that] illuminate and interpret traditional academic pedagogy, enacting criticism as a dynamic psychoanalytic and philosophical contribution to cultural objects".

== Exhibitions ==
Jeanne Randolph has exhibited many photograph series and other installations including the following according to.

Pythagoras of the Prairies - May 16 - June 21, 2025, Paul Petro Contemporary Art, Toronto

Watershed - September 6 - October 5, 2024, Paul Petro Contemporary Art, Toronto
