= VIVO Media Arts Centre =

Coordinates: 49.2608°N 123.0476°W

VIVO Media Arts Centre, run under the Satellite Video Exchange Society, (SVES) is an artist-run centre and video distribution library located in Vancouver, Canada. It was founded in 1973 to promote the non-commercial use of video technology by providing international and educational video exchange through a public video library. Its mission has then been expanded to provide equipment rentals, artist workshops, and provide information to the public about media arts.

== History ==
A group of artists interested in video met at the Matrix Video Conference, held at the Vancouver Art Gallery in 1973. Organized by Michael Goldberg and Trish Hardman, the conference encouraged depositing a videotape and filling out a Video Exchange Directory card. Shawn Preus and Paul Wong were recruited to work on the collection, and this became the base of a video library. Shortly after the conference, The Satellite Video Exchange Society was founded (incorporated in 1973), and included a publicly accessible video library; the space later became known as the Video Inn. Its space became a sort of "drop-in" where artistic and other communities came together, and included viewing spaces and tape shelves. Starting out as Intermedia, VIVO is an early Canadian example of an artist-run centre, and exhibited the characteristics of the tentative beginnings of the artist-run centre and the development of new forms of art making that such centres generated.

=== Intermedia ===
Intermedia existed between 1967 and 1972 in Vancouver, and served as an umbrella organization for diverse interdisciplinary practices including performance, music, poetry, happenings, dance, cooking, photography, filmmaking, fashion, sculpture, music and video. A priority towards ephemeral art, much was staged outside of institutional spaces. Many were inspired and participated in Intermedia's events, including General Idea, where AA Bronson details, "inspired by Canada's first artist-run centre, the unbeatable, unforgettable, indescribable wonder that was Intermedia (where Jorge performed his first art performance in Vancouver in 1968)." While Intermedia dissolved in 1972, it played a role in the denial of becoming a constrained institutional directive. Many independent organizations and spaces came out of Intermedia, most notably a direct link to what is now VIVO Media Art Centre.

== Programming ==
VIVO Media Arts Centre facilitates various programming structures including events, exhibitions, artist and curatorial residencies, and media workshops and has hosted festivals such as Vancouver New Music Festival, and LIVE (performance) Biennale in 2015. The space has hosted artists and curators such as Noxious Sector, Paul Wong, Stacey Ho, Jayce Salloum, Hank Bull, Abbas Akhavan, Elizabeth MacKenzie and Marina Roy.

=== Crista Dahl Media Library & Archive ===
VIVO is home to the Crista Dahl Media Library & Archive (CDMLA) Canada’s most significant repositories of video by artists and independent producers. It includes over 5000 video titles, an extensive publication and textual record collection, a photo archive, and the societal records of its parent organization - the Satellite Video Exchange Society (SVES). The Archive safeguards video collections chronicling unique B.C. histories including those of Metro Media, The Women’s Labour History Project, The First Nations Access Program, Vancouver Status of Women, GaybleVision, Operation Solidarity, and Women in Focus. Crista Dahl, after whom the archive and library is named, is a long-standing SVES member and VIVO volunteer (former board chairperson, board member, and volunteer archivist). Dahl's involvement with the organization began from her involvement Intermedia in the 1970s. She supported Michael Goldberg with international video exchange projects which resulted in the Matrix Video Conference tape exchange and eight International Video Exchange Directories (1971 to 1981)—all of which form the basis of the current collection. A tireless volunteer with a natural affinity to archiving, Crista Dahl has been described as a "visionary volunteer archivist."
