= Cecep Syamsul Hari =

Indonesian poet

- Born: May 1, 1967 (age 59); Bandung, West Java
- Citizenship: Indonesian
- Occupations: Poet, magazine editor, novelist

Cecep Syamsul Hari (born May 1, 1967, in Bandung, West Java) is an Indonesian poet. He is the editor of Horison Monthly literary magazine. Besides poems, he has published selected essays, critics, short-stories, a fictocriticism novel, and some translation-works. His works have been translated into English, German, Korea, Bengali, Portugal, and Czech.
