= Jesse Bering =

American psychologist (born 1975)

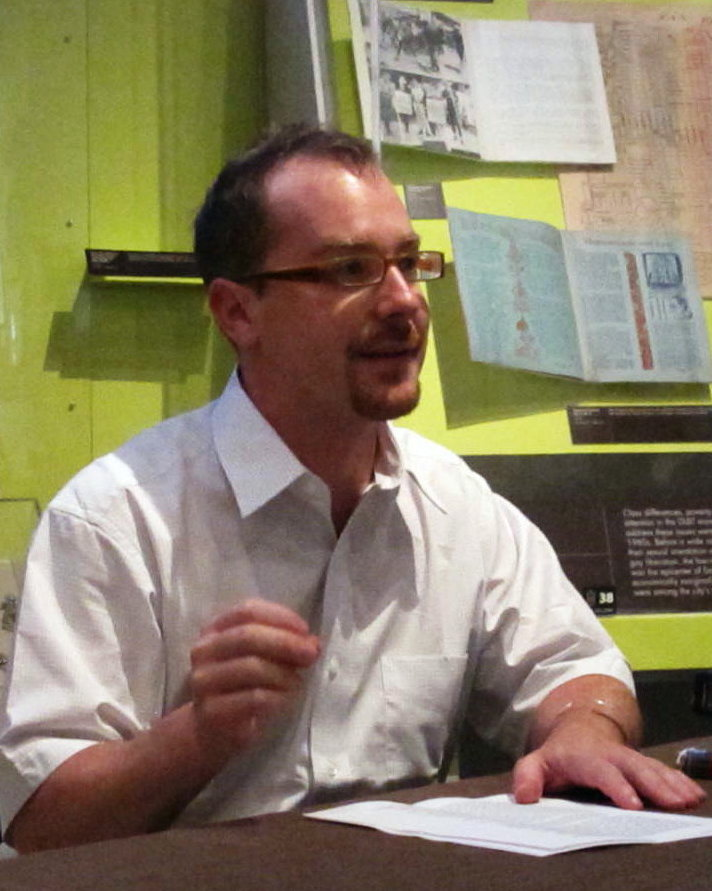
- Bering speaking in 2012
- Born: Jesse Michael Bering; May 6, 1975 (age 51)
- Occupations: Psychologist; Writer
- Website: jessebering.com

Jesse Michael Bering (born May 6, 1975) is an American psychologist, writer, and academic. He is a professor in Psychology at the University of Otago where he serves as Director of the Centre for Science Communication.

== Early life and education ==
Bering was born in 1975 in New Jersey, the son of a secular Jewish mother and a non-religious Lutheran father. Having grown up in a highly conservative culture, he reports feeling anxiety about his sexual orientation during his childhood. This experience led to his interest in academic disciplines like human sexuality and the cognitive science of religion. He attended graduate school at the University of Louisiana at Lafayette where he earned his MA degree (1999) under Daniel J. Povinelli, studying chimpanzee social cognition. He then transferred to Florida Atlantic University, where he obtained a PhD in developmental psychology (2002). His doctoral advisor was David F. Bjorklund. Bering's formal academic research is in the area of the cognitive science of religion.

== Career and views ==
Bering is the former director of the Institute of Cognition and Culture at Queen's University Belfast and began his career as a psychology professor at the University of Arkansas. After a period as a full-time writer and visiting scholar at Wells College, he accepted an academic position in Science Communication at the University of Otago in 2014.

Bering is notable for his frank and humorous handling of controversial issues in psychological science, especially those dealing with human sexuality. His Scientific American blog, Bering in Mind, was named a 2010 Webby Award Honoree for the Blog-Cultural category by members of The International Academy of Digital Arts and Sciences. He also received the 2010 "Scientist of the Year Award" from the National Organization of Gay and Lesbian Scientists and Technical Professionals (NOGLSTP), an affiliate of the American Association for the Advancement of Science.

He was also a Project Partner in the Oxford University-based 'Explaining Religion' project, a three-year, €2 million project funded by the European Commission.

In his book Perv: The Sexual Deviant in All of Us he argues that paraphilias (so-called "sexual perversions" or "deviancies") should be viewed objectively and judged by the harm they cause, not by moral disgust. His account, in a somewhat light-hearted manner, includes anecdotes of his own experiences as a gay teenager.

== Works ==
- The Belief Instinct: The Psychology of Souls, Destiny, and the Meaning of Life (W. W. Norton, 2011) – named one of the top 25 books of 2011 by the American Library Association.
- Why is the Penis Shaped Like That? And Other Reflections on Being Human (Farrar, Straus & Giroux, 2012)
- Perv: The Sexual Deviant in All of Us (Farrar, Straus & Giroux, 2013)
- Suicidal: Why We Kill Ourselves (University of Chicago Press, 2018)
- A Very Human Ending: How suicide haunts our species (Black Swan, 2018)
- The Incredible Afterlives of Dr. Stevenson: One Scientist’s Epic Quest for Evidence of Reincarnation, Apparitions, Poltergeists, and Other Matters of the Soul (University of Chicago Press, 2026)
