= Crista Dahl =

Canadian artist

Crista Dahl (born 1934) is a Canadian artist based in Vancouver, British Columbia, volunteer and the person for whom The Crista Dahl Media Library & Archive is named (see, VIVO Media Arts Centre). Crista Dahl is a long-standing SVES member and VIVO volunteer (former board chairperson, board member, and volunteer archivist). Dahl's involvement with the organization began from her involvement Intermedia in the 1970s. She supported Michael Goldberg with international video exchange projects which resulted in the Matrix Video Conference tape exchange and eight International Video Exchange Directories (1971 to 1981)—all of which form the basis of the current collection. Dahl is a practicing artist and serves as a volunteer at The Crista Dahl Media Library & Archives.

== Artistic practice ==
An active artist in Vancouver's early experimental art community, Crista Dahl (known then as Crista Preus) was a member of Intermedia. At the end of Intermedia, she joined Video Inn (now known as VIVO Media Arts Centre), one of the artist-run organization which emerged in Intermedia's wake. In the early days of Video Inn, she participated in the development of the organization's collectively managed screening, production, archiving and domestic space at 261 Powell Street. She was a resident at this location for a time and recounts the collectively shared meals prepared by members of Vancouver's early media art community in an interview with the authors of Anamnesia.

Dahl's interest in pre- and early cultural history informed participatory art projects, which engaged the public (often in schools) in hands-on activities using organic materials and performance. Crista Dahl's art and art teaching were supported by educational and arts funding. Committed to alternative education processes and models, she worked for Vancouver Society for Total Education and helped to develop and administer an educational program for under-served youth called Intensive Childcare Resource. In 1972 she received, with psychologist Carol Aellen, a grant of $14,040 in federal funding through a program called "Local Initiatives." The funding resulted in a project with hands-on workshops based on the development of human culture, including language, ritual, technologies and time. Over all named the Life Rhythm project (1966 - 1970, 2013), her workshops, performances, and media installation about concepts of time and space, have been presented at Vancouver Art Gallery, Simon Fraser University, Surrey Art Centre, Burnaby Art Gallery and University of British Columbia, among others. A retrospective of her art was exhibited at VIVO Media Arts Centre in 2013. It included Life Rhythm as well as drawings, paintings and sculpture. Three performances, Generations, Spiral Brain, and Revolution, were programmed during the exhibition. Archival photographs documenting participants engaged in Life Rhythm activities in the 1970s by Dahl's previous husband, John Preus, were included in Crista Dahl: Life Rhythm a Retrospective.

== History ==
Dahl was born in Seattle, Washington in 1934. Her artistic abilities were recognized and she was accepted to the San Francisco Art Institute for training, but was unable to attend due to inability to find resources to pay for the training. In early adulthood, she moved to San Francisco where she was involved in Haight-Ashbury culture. Her move with her four children to Canada in 1971 was motivated by a desire for her husband (John Preus), and potentially her children, to avoid the US Army draft. They settled in Lund, British Columbia where Dahl informally taught art to children and developed an independent research interest in archeology, through, for example Will and Ariel Durant's The Story of Civilization which she found in the Powell River Library near Lund. She moved with her family to Vancouver, British Columbia in 1971.
