= WIF domain =

WIF protein domain

Identifiers
- Symbol: WIF
- Pfam: PF02019
- InterPro: IPR003306
Available protein structures:
- PDB: IPR003306 PF02019 (ECOD; PDBsum)
- AlphaFold: IPR003306; PF02019

In molecular biology, the protein domain, WIF N-terminal refers to the N terminal domain of the protein, WIF. It stands for, Wnt-inhibitory factor, whereby wnt is a signalling molecule also known as wingless. Wnt is a molecule in the wnt signaling pathway. The WIF domain binds to the wnt ligand since it inhibits it.

== Function ==
The function of the WIF domain is to bind to Wnt ligands and prevent the downstream signal transduction. Inevitably, this prevents cell development in embryogenesis and cancer.

== Structure ==
The domain is extracellular, meaning it is on the outside of the cell and it contains two conserved cysteines that form a disulphide bridge. This domain is Wnt binding in WIF, and it has been suggested that RYK may also bind to Wnt. More specifically, crystal structure of WIF-1(WD) show a binding site for phospholipid; two acyl chains extending deep into the domain, and a head group is exposed to the surface.

== Wnt Ligand ==
Wnt proteins constitute a large family of secreted molecules that are involved in intercellular signalling during development. The name derives from the first 2 members of the family to be discovered: int-1 (mouse) and wingless (Drosophila). It is now recognised that Wnt signalling controls many cell fate decisions in a variety of different organisms, including mammals. Wnt signalling has been implicated in tumourigenesis, early mesodermal patterning of the embryo, morphogenesis of the brain and kidneys, regulation of mammary gland proliferation and Alzheimer's disease.

Wnt-mediated signalling is believed to proceed initially through binding to cell surface receptors of the frizzled family; the signal is subsequently transduced through several cytoplasmic components to B-catenin, which enters the nucleus and activates the transcription of several genes important in development. More recently, however, several non-canonical Wnt signalling pathways have been elucidated that act independently of B-catenin. Members of the Wnt gene family are defined by their sequence similarity to mouse Wnt-1 and Wingless in Drosophila. They encode proteins of ~350-400 residues in length, with orthologues identified in several, mostly vertebrate, species. Very little is known about the structure of Wnts as they are notoriously insoluble; but they share the following features characteristics of secretory proteins: a signal peptide, several potential N-glycosylation sites and 22 conserved cysteines that are probably involved in disulphide bonds. The Wnt proteins seem to adhere to the plasma membrane of the secreting cells and are therefore likely to signal over only few cell diameters. Fifteen major Wnt gene families have been identified in vertebrates, with multiple subtypes within some classes.
