= Carl Rhodes =

Australian academic

- Occupations: Professor, Dean

Academic background
- Education: University of Technology Sydney DLitt

Academic work
- Notable works: Woke Capitalism: How Corporate Morality is Sabotaging Democracy (2021), Stinking Rich: The Four Myths of the Good Billionaire (2025)
- Website: https://profiles.uts.edu.au/Carl.Rhodes

Carl Rhodes is an Australian academic who serves as Professor of Business and Society at the University of Technology Sydney Business School; he was the Dean from 2021 to 2025.

== Academic career ==
Rhodes has held academic posts at universities in Australia and the United Kingdom, including at Swansea University, the University of Leicester, and Macquarie University.

His research concerns the ethical and political dimensions of corporate activity, including questions of corporate power, democratic accountability, and inequality.

Rhodes serves on the editorial boards of Human Relations, Organization Studies, Organization and the Journal of Business Ethics. He is editor of the book series Routledge Studies in Business Ethics

== Public commentary ==
Rhodes has contributed commentary and analysis to Australian and international media outlets, including The GuardianThe Guardian, ABC News (Australia), The Sydney Morning Herald and The Conversation.

He has appeared at public events and on broadcast and podcast programs including The Festival of Dangerous Ideas, Sydney Writers Festival, ABC News (Australia), Late Night Live, The Bunker, and Uncomfortable Conversations with Josh Szeps

== Recognition ==
Rhodes has been listed on Stanford University's database of the world's top 2% most-cited scientists. In 2017 he received a Doctor of Letters from the University of Technology Sydney.

== Selected works ==
- Rhodes, Carl and Pullen, Alison (2026) The Good Business School: The Political Imperative of Management in the 21st Century, Bristol University Press. ISBN 978-1529250916.
- Rhodes, Carl (2025). Stinking Rich. Bristol University Press. ISBN 978-1529239119.
- Rhodes, Carl (2022). Woke Capitalism. Bristol University Press. ISBN 978-1529211672.
- Pullen, A. and Rhodes, C. (2022) Organizing Corporeal Ethics, London: Routledge. ISBN 978-1-032-16955-2
- Rhodes, C. (2020) Disturbing Business Ethics: Emmanuel Levinas and the Politics of Organization. London: Routledge. ISBN 978-0-367-51391-7
- Bloom, P. and Rhodes, C. (2018) CEO Society: The Corporate Takeover of Everyday Life, London: Zed. ISBN 978-1-78699-072-3
- Pullen, A., and Rhodes, C. Eds. (2015) The Routledge Companion to Ethics, Politics and Organizations, London: Routledge. ISBN 978-1-032-09861-6
- Rhodes, C. and Lilley, S. Eds. (2012) Organizations and Popular Culture: Information, Representation and Transformation, London; Routledge. ISBN 978-0-415-69238-0
- Pullen, A. and Rhodes, C. Eds. (2009) Bits of Organization, Copenhagen: CBS/Liber. ISBN 978-82-15-01470-8
- Rhodes, C., and Westwood, R. (2008) Critical Representations of Work and Organizations in Popular Culture, London: RoutledgeFalmer. ISBN 978-0-415-57850-9
- Westwood, R. and Rhodes, C. Eds. (2007) Humour, Work and Organization, London: RoutledgeFalmer. ISBN 978-0-415-38413-1
- Clegg, S.R. and Rhodes, C. Eds. (2006) Management Ethics – Contemporary Contexts, London: RoutledgeFalmer. ISBN 978-0-415-39336-2
- Chappell, C., Rhodes, C., Solomon, N., Tennant M., and Yates L. (2003) Reconstructing the Lifelong Learner: Pedagogies of Individual, Organizational and Social Change, London: RoutledgeFalmer. ISBN 978-0-415-26347-4
- Rhodes, C. (2001) Writing Organization: (Re)presentation and Control in Narratives at Work, Advances in Organization Studies 7, Amsterdam/Philadelphia: John Benjamins Publishing Company. ISBN 978-90-272-3304-2
- Garrick, J. and Rhodes, C. Eds. (2000) Research and Knowledge at Work: Perspectives, Case-studies and Innovative Strategies, London: Routledge. ISBN 978-0-415-21338-7
