= Jeannie Thib =

Canadian artist

- Born: February 10, 1955; North Bay, Ontario
- Died: October 23, 2013 (aged 58); Toronto, Ontario
- Known for: Sculptor who made Public Art, Printmaker

Jeannie Thib (1955–2013) was a Canadian artist, sculptor and printmaker.

== Biography ==
Thib was born in North Bay, Ontario, in 1955 and obtained a Bachelor of Fine Arts at York University in Toronto in 1979. Inspired by her experiences in the wilderness of Northern Ontario, her work included ornamented sculptures, installations and prints. Thib exhibited in Canada, the U.S., Europe, and Australia, and she was commercially represented by the Leo Kamen Gallery, the Katzman and Joan Ferneyhough galleries. In 2008, an exhibition catalogue of her work with essays by Patrick Mahon and Suzanne Danis Légé was co-published by the Koffler Centre of the Arts and Foreman Art Gallery of Bishop's University.

Thib died in 2013 at the age of 58, after battling cancer for five years. She was survived by her partner Bruce Holland. The Katzman Gallery hosted a memorial exhibition, Imprint, in February 2014.

== Exhibitions ==
- Manual 1, 3 and 4 by Jeannie Thib, National Gallery of Canada, Ottawa, 1998
- Lure, Koffler Gallery, Koffler Centre of the Arts, Toronto, 2004
- Cache, Lake Nipissing, 2008
- Moon Transit, St. Clair Streetcar Line, Toronto, 2010

== Collections ==
Thib's work is included in the collection of the National Gallery of Canada.
