= Seth Stephens-Davidowitz =

American data scientist and economist

- Born: Seth Isaac Stephens-Davidowitz; September 15, 1982 (age 43); Englewood, New Jersey
- Education: Stanford University; Harvard University
- Known for: Research using Google Trends to study human behavior
- Scientific career
- Fields: Data science Economics
- Institutions: Google
- Thesis: Essays Using Google Data (2013)
- Doctoral advisor: Alberto Alesina
- Website: sethsd.com

Seth Isaac Stephens-Davidowitz (born September 15, 1982) is an American data scientist, economist, and author. He has worked as a New York Times op-ed contributor, a data scientist at Google, as well as a visiting lecturer at the Wharton School of the University of Pennsylvania. He has published research using Google Trends search data, as well as data from Wikipedia and Facebook, to gain real-time insights into people's thoughts and beliefs that they may be unwilling to admit publicly.

His first book Everybody Lies was published by HarperCollins in 2017. The book subsequently became a New York Times bestseller, and was named a book of the year by both PBS NewsHour and the Economist.

== Biography ==
Stephens-Davidowitz was born on September 15, 1982, in Englewood, New Jersey into a Jewish family, son of Esther Davidowitz and Mitchell Stephens. He grew up in Alpine, New Jersey, and attended Tenafly High School in Tenafly, graduating in 1999. He went on to earn his B.A. in philosophy from Stanford University before enrolling at Harvard University, where he received a Ph.D. in economics in 2013.

== Everybody Lies ==
Everybody Lies was published by HarperCollins in 2017. The book has received several reviews and other coverage, was a New York Times bestseller, and was named a book of the year by both PBS NewsHour and the Economist.

The overriding theme of the book is that people aren't as honest about their true natures when responding to standard questionnaires as they are when searching the internet, on the assumption that search is a private activity. Of particular note is the empirical chapter, Chapter 4: Digital Truth Serum, derived from extensive Big Data analysis of search engine search histories (primarily Google's) on sensitive subject matters such as prejudice, violence, and sexuality. The remainder of the book addresses the surrounding issues of methodology, epistemology, and moral philosophy.

In 2022, Stephens-Davidowitz published another book, Don't Trust Your Gut: Using Data to Get What You Really Want in Life.
