= Jennifer Fisher (art historian) =

Canadian art historian and curator

Jennifer Fisher is a Canadian art historian and curator specializing in contemporary art and culture studies.

== Biography ==
In her research, Jennifer Fisher engages cultural studies approaches to examine contemporary art, curatorial practice, display culture and the aesthetics of the non-visual senses. She is a founding member of the curatorial collaborative DisplayCult, with Jim Drobnick, which produced the exhibitions CounterPoses (1998), Vital Signs (2000), Museopathy (2001), and Linda Montano: 14 Years of Living Art (2002).

Fisher has published widely on contemporary art and served for six years as assistant editor of Parachute magazine. She co-directed UnCommon Senses: The Senses in Art and Culture, a large interdisciplinary conference at Concordia University in 2000. She is currently editing a book on the sixth sense.

Fisher was Contemporary Art Fellow at the Canadian Centre for the Visual Arts at the National Gallery of Canada, and has held research affiliations at the Society for Fellows in the Humanities at Cornell University and the Department of Performance Studies at the Tisch School of the Arts at New York University.
