= Whitney Fitzsimmons =

Australian journalist

Whitney Fitzsimmons is an Australian journalist.

== Career ==
Fitzsimmons has been a TV presenter for over eight years at the ABC [Australian Broadcasting Corporation]. She is currently the host of Business Today, which is broadcast on ABC1, ABC News 24 and Australia Network [the ABC's international TV network]; she has been with the program since it began in August 2006.

During Fitzsimmons' ten years with the ABC she has held many positions ranging from senior producer of Lateline, anchor of Lateline Business, The World, Afternoon Live, The Drum, The Midday Report - summer edition, the current affairs program AustraliaWide and finance presenter on the Midday Report alongside Ros Childs, and reported nationally on ABC News on general news and business stories.

Previously Fitzsimmons was a news presenter for Australia Network and anchored major world events such as the 7 July 2005 London bombings, the devastation of Hurricane Katrina, the Palestinian elections and the end of Israeli Prime Minister, Ariel Sharon's political career.

In 2009, she was awarded a Jefferson Fellowship from the East West Centre in Honolulu, to study the impact of the financial crisis on Asia. She is also the recipient of a 2008 fellowship from the Asia Pacific Journalism Centre.

Fitzsimmons holds a Master in Arts: Journalism from the University of Technology Sydney and a Bachelor of Arts: Theatre and Performance from the Western Sydney University - Nepean.

Media offices
Preceded by Program started	Business Today; Presenter; August 2006–Present	Succeeded by Incumbent
