= Tim Soutphommasane =

Australian columnist

Dr Tim Soutphommasane
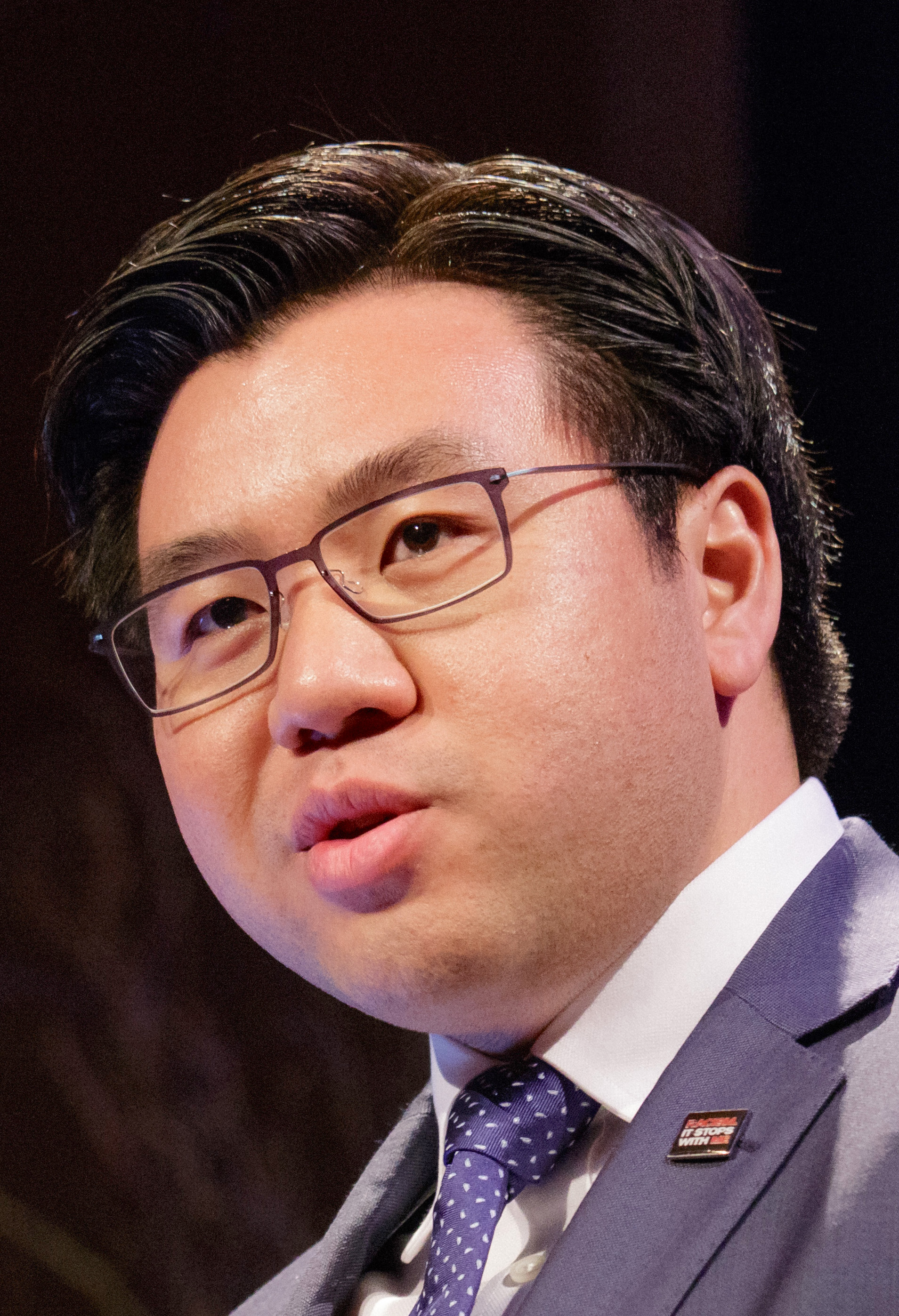
- Soutphommasane in 2015
- Born: Thinethavone Soutphommasane; 1982 (age 43–44); Montpellier, France
- Education: University of Sydney; Balliol College, Oxford (MPhil, DPhil)
- Occupations: Race Discrimination Commissioner; Professor

Thinethavone "Tim" Soutphommasane (/suːtˈpɒməsɑːn/ soot-POM-ə-sahn; born 1982) is an Australian academic, social commentator and former public servant. He is a professor and Chief Diversity Officer at the University of Oxford and was Australia's Race Discrimination Commissioner at the Australian Human Rights Commission from 2013 to 2018.

He has previously been a political staffer for Bob Carr, a columnist with the Sydney Morning Herald, The Age and The Australian newspapers, a lecturer at Sydney and Monash Universities, and a research fellow with the Per Capita think tank. He was a member of the board of the National Australia Day Council, and a member of the Australian Multicultural Council.

== Early life ==
Soutphommasane was born in Montpellier, France in 1982 to Chinese and Lao parents who had fled Laos as refugees in 1975.

His family was resettled by the Family Reunion Program of the Australian Department of Immigration and Ethnic Affairs to Sydney's south-western suburbs in 1985, where he was raised. He was educated at Hurlstone Agricultural High School.

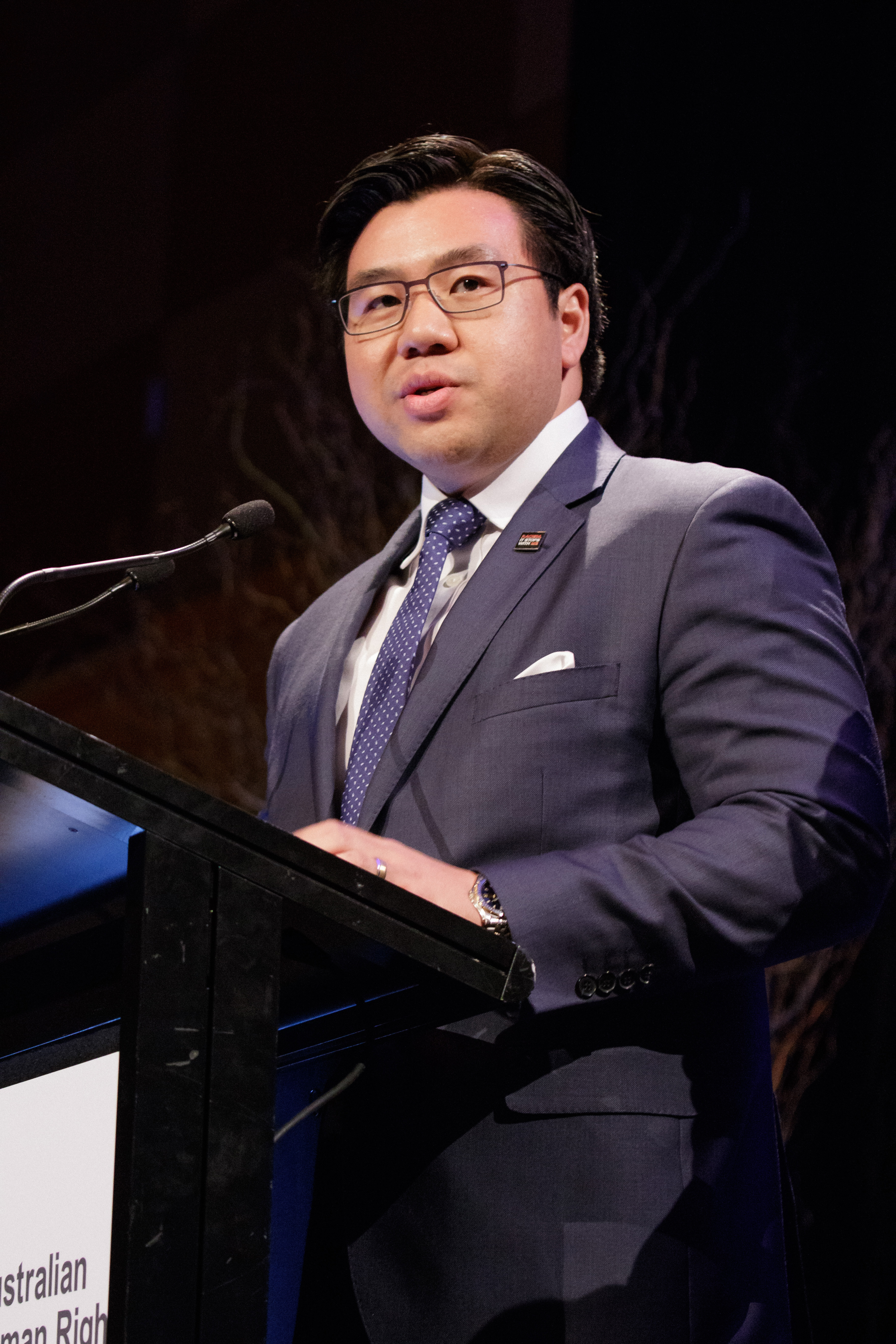
Soutphommasane delivering a speech at the 2015 Human Rights Awards.

== Academia ==
Soutphommasane graduated from the University of Sydney with a first-class honours degree. He was then a Commonwealth Scholar and Jowett Senior Scholar at Balliol College of the University of Oxford where he completed a Master of Philosophy with distinction and a Doctor of Philosophy in political theory.

From 2010 to 2012, he was a Lecturer in Australian Studies and a Research Fellow at the National Centre for Australian Studies of Monash University. He was one of six chief investigators on an Australian Research Council Linkage project studying the history of ANZAC Day.

In 2019, he was appointed Professor of Practice in Sociology and Political Theory at the University of Sydney to teach human rights related theory.

Since 2023, Soutphommasane has been Chief Diversity Officer at the University of Oxford. He is also a Professor of Practice in Human Rights and Political Theory at the Department of Politics and International Relations, and a Senior Research Fellow at Balliol College.

== Human rights ==
Soutphommasane was Race Discrimination Commissioner at the Australian Human Rights Commission during 2013-2018.

During his term he led the National Anti-Racism Strategy and Partnership, which included the anti-racism campaign, 'Racism. It Stops with Me'. He also produced reports on the representation of cultural diversity in the leadership of Australian organisations.

During debates about the Racial Discrimination Act and free speech, Soutphommasane was an advocate for retaining section 18C of the Act.

== Journalism ==
Soutphommasane was a regular writer for the Sydney Morning Herald, The Age and The Australian newspapers, to which he contributed feature articles and the Ask the Philosopher column each Saturday. He also wrote for The Monthly magazine. While living in England, Soutphommasane was a freelance journalist, contributing articles to The Guardian and The Financial Times, as well as opinion pieces and reviews to The Spectator, The Australian, The Sydney Morning Herald and The Age.

== Writing ==
Soutphommasane's first book Reclaiming Patriotism: Nation-Building for Australian Progressives was published in 2009. Loosely based on research undertaken toward his doctoral thesis, the book argues that people with progressive politics must re-engage with ideas of patriotism and national identity, which Soutphommasane claims were surrendered to the right during the Prime Ministership of John Howard.

His The Virtuous Citizen: Patriotism in a Multicultural Society was published in 2012 and Don't Go Back To Where You Came From: Why Multiculturalism Works, published the same year, won the NSW Premier's Literary Award in the 'Community Relations Commission Award' section.

His other books include I'm Not Racist But ... 40 Years of the Racial Discrimination Act (2015) and On Hate (2018).

== Other roles ==
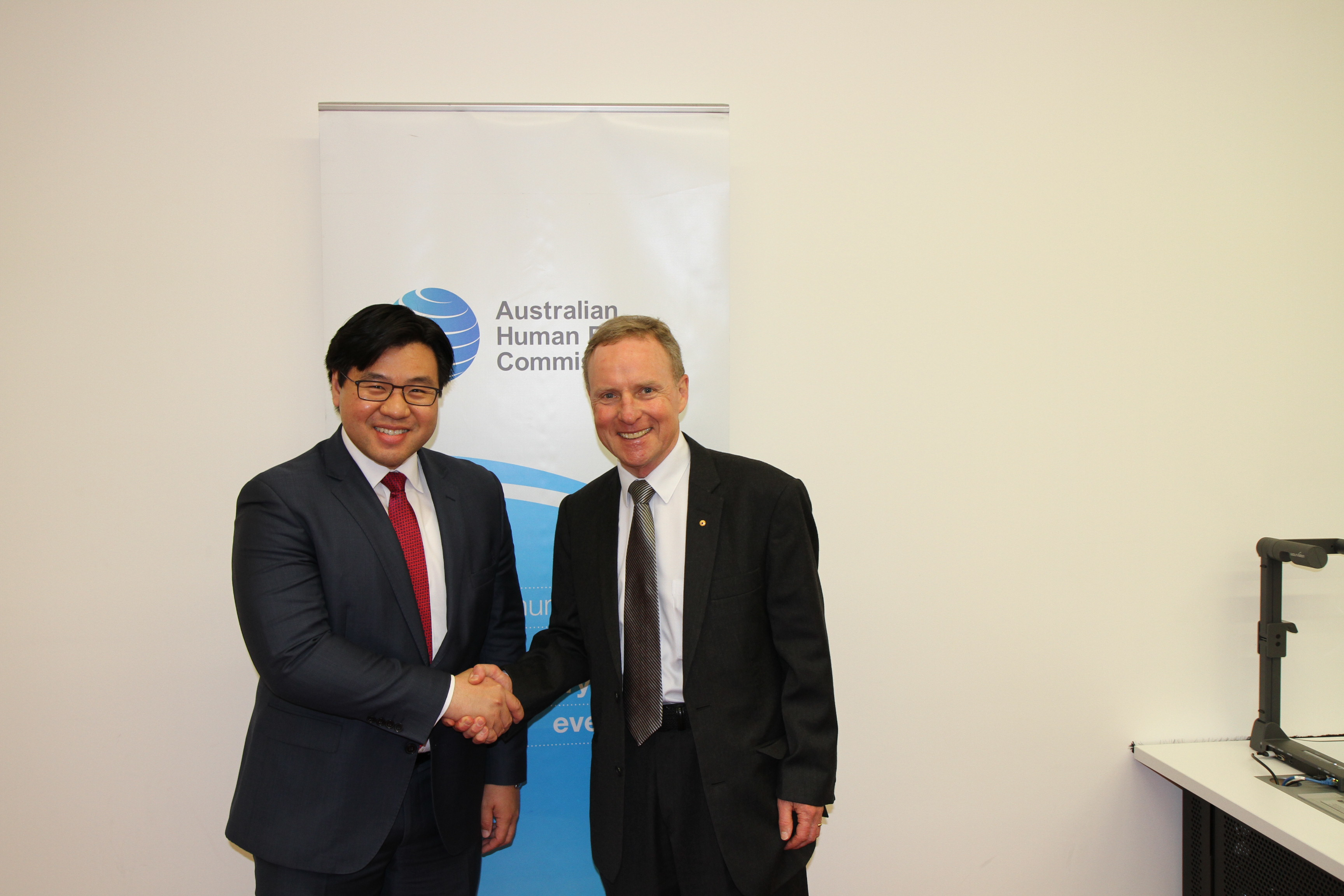
Soutphommasane with David Morrison in 2016.

Soutphommasane was appointed to the Australian Multicultural Council in August 2011.

== Political activity ==
Soutphommasane joined the Australian Labor Party in 1998, aged 15. He later worked on the speechwriting staff of then New South Wales Premier Bob Carr. He also worked as a staffer on Kevin Rudd's Kevin 07 campaign.

== Books ==
- Reclaiming Patriotism: Nation-Building for Australian Progressives (Port Melb: Cambridge University Press, 2009) Paperback, ISBN 978-0-521-13472-9
- Don't Go Back To Where You Came From: Why Multiculturalism Works (New South Books, 2012), ISBN 978-1-74223-336-9
- The Virtuous Citizen: Patriotism in a Multicultural Society (Cambridge University Press, 2012) ISBN 978-1-107-02514-1
- I'm Not Racist But ... 40 Years of the Racial Discrimination Act (NewSouth Publishing, 2015) ISBN 978-1-74224-205-7
- On Hate (Melbourne University Press, 2019) ISBN 978-0-522-87535-5
