= Scorcher: The Dirty Politics of Climate Change =

2007 book by Clive Hamilton

- Author: Clive Hamilton
- Subject: Howard government, Kyoto Protocol
- Publisher: Black Inc
- Publication date: 2007
- Pages: 266
- ISBN: 978-0-9775949-0-0

Scorcher: The Dirty Politics of Climate Change is a 2007 book by Clive Hamilton which contends that Australia rather than the United States is the major stumbling block to a more effective Kyoto Protocol. In the final chapter of the book Hamilton argues that "the Howard government has been actively working to destroy the Kyoto Protocol".

Scorcher is an updated version of Hamilton's 2001 book, Running from the Storm. Other books by Clive Hamilton include Requiem for a Species, Silencing Dissent, Growth Fetish, Affluenza and The Freedom Paradox.

== Quotes ==
- "In the tight little world of greenhouse lobbying, the Prime Minister saw nothing improper in going to the country's biggest greenhouse polluters to ask them what the Government should do about greenhouse policy, without extending the same opportunity to other industries, not to mention environment groups and independent experts".

== See also ==
- An Inconvenient Truth – a 2006 documentary featuring Al Gore
- Climate Code Red – a 2008 book from Australia on climate change
- Greenhouse Mafia
- List of Australian environmental books
- Politics of global warming
- Storms of My Grandchildren – a 2009 book by climate scientist James Hansen

== Bibliography ==
- Hamilton, Clive (2007). Scorcher: The Dirty Politics of Climate Change, Black Inc Agenda, 266 pages.
