= List of Australian environmental books =

This is a list of Australian environmental books:

- Global Spin: The Corporate Assault on Environmentalism (1997), by Sharon Beder
- Human Ecology, Human Economy: Ideas for an Ecologically Sustainable Future (1997), edited by Mark Diesendorf and Clive Hamilton
- Running from the Storm: The Development of Climate Change Policy in Australia (2001), by Clive Hamilton
- A Big Fix: Radical Solutions for Australia's Environmental Crisis (2005), by Ian Lowe
- Living in the Hothouse: How Global Warming Affects Australia (2005), by Ian Lowe
- The Weather Makers (2005), by Tim Flannery
- Environmental Principles and Policies (2006), by Sharon Beder
- Chasing Kangaroos (2007), by Tim Flannery
- Greenhouse Solutions with Sustainable Energy (2007), by Mark Diesendorf
- High and Dry: John Howard, Climate Change and the Selling of Australia's Future (2007), by Guy Pearse
- Maralinga: Australia’s Nuclear Waste Cover-up (2007), by Alan Parkinson
- Reaction Time: Climate Change and the Nuclear Option (2007), by Ian Lowe
- Scorcher: The Dirty Politics of Climate Change (2007), by Clive Hamilton
- Climate Code Red: The Case for Emergency Action (2008), by David Spratt and Philip Sutton
- Now or Never: A Sustainable Future for Australia? (2008), by Tim Flannery
- Quarry Vision: Coal, Climate Change and the End of the Resources Boom (2009), by Guy Pearse
- Requiem for a Species (2010), by Clive Hamilton

== See also ==
- List of environmental books
- List of environmental issues
