= Affluenza (disambiguation) =

Affluenza is a term used by critics of consumerism.

Affluenza may also refer to:

- Affluenza: The All-Consuming Epidemic, 2001 book by John de Graaf
- Affluenza: When Too Much is Never Enough, 2005 book written by Clive Hamilton and Richard Denniss
- Affluenza, 2007 book by Oliver James
- Affluenza (film), 2014 American drama film
- "Affluenza", song by Conan Gray from the 2020 album Kid Krow
- "Affluenza", song by Theory of a Deadman from their 2020 album Say Nothing
