= Living in the Hothouse =

2005 book by Ian Lowe

Living in the Hothouse: How Global Warming Affects Australia
- Author: Ian Lowe
- Genre: Non-fiction
- Publication date: 2005

Living in the Hothouse: How Global Warming Affects Australia is a 2005 book by Professor Ian Lowe which is a sequel to his Living in the Greenhouse (1989). The book presents a detailed analysis of climate change science and the likely impact of climate change in Australia. Living in the Hothouse also offers a critical overview of the Howard government's policy response to climate change in Australia.

Ian Lowe, AO, is a scientist, environmental policy analyst, and president of the Australian Conservation Foundation, who has served on many federal, state and local government committees.

Other books by Ian Lowe include Reaction Time and A Big Fix.

== See also ==
- List of Australian environmental books
- Climate change in Australia
