= World War II-scale climate mobilization =

Policy approach to climate change

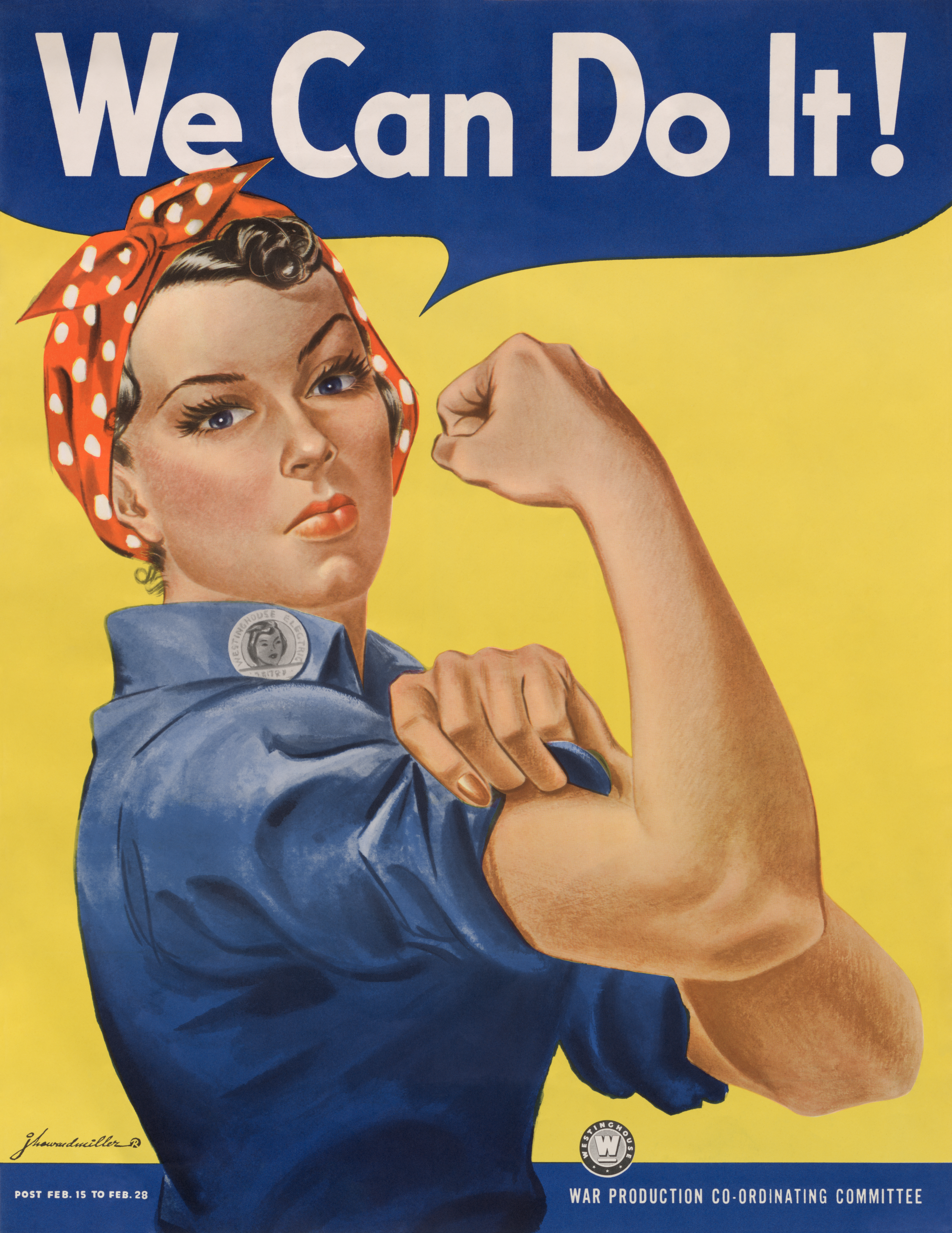
"We Can Do It!", by J. Howard Miller, depicts the allegorical American WW2 female icon Rosie the Riveter. The image encapsulates the language and attitude of public information campaigns that would be part of a WW2-scale climate mobilization.

A climate mobilization is an environmental policy approach to the climate emergency that takes inspiration from policies utilized during the World War 2 (WW2) home front economic and social mobilizations of Allied forces, particularly from Western anglophone countries, to rapidly restructure economies and align consumption around the societal goal of defeating fascism.

Calls for climate mobilization approaches came in response to the perceived inability of conventional climate policy approaches to draw down emissions at the speed and scale necessary to limit the risks of locking in the worst impacts of climate change. Proponents argue that the level of mobilization and policy action required to face the climate crisis is on a scale not seen since WW2.

== Components ==
Several plans have been developed using the WW2 home front experience as a model, and while there are differences between each plan, some of the major commonalities most have with the wartime experience are:

=== Adopting an emergency mindset ===
The mobilization approach calls for national governments break from business-as-usual approaches to the climate crisis and to begin treating it like an emergency. The Breakthrough - National Center for Climate Restoration developed a guide to help distinguish between business-as-usual policy approaches to crises and emergency approaches, the following table is adapted from the guide with a focus on mindset:

Business-as-Usual Mindset	Emergency Mindset
Treats the crisis as one competing priority among many	Elevates the crisis to absolute top priority during response period
Operates on standard political timelines and processes	Responds with unprecedented speed and decisiveness
Downplays or normalizes potential threats	Acknowledges existential threats with complete transparency
Maintains conventional bureaucratic procedures	Adapts systems dynamically to meet emergency needs
Assumes problems can be solved incrementally	Recognizes tipping points and the need for immediate large-scale intervention
Focuses on maintaining normal operations	Willingly disrupts routines to address the emergency

=== Initiating mass communication campaigns ===
Advocates of a climate mobilization approach argue that mass public information campaigns on the scale seen during World War 2 are an essential element of effectively addressing the climate emergency, and that government communication efforts up to present have been small in scale, and have not been tied to meeting economic and social objectives. They point to the WW2 examples of the United States and Canada, where both governments created central government agencies, the United States Office of War Information and the Wartime Information Board, respectively. These agencies were mandated to produce and distribute war time information through newspapers, radio broadcasts, posters, photographs, films and other forms of media, both at home and abroad with the objective of mobilizing the public to work in key economic sectors and change their consumption patterns, as well as keeping public morale high and informing Allies about their efforts. These agencies worked in concert with the high-level government departments responsible for war time economic planning, and ensured public information was created to meet the needs of these departments. A climate mobilization would see the creation of similar information agencies.

=== Central economic planning ===
Climate mobilization approach proposes comprehensive government-led economic planning to rapidly transition to low-carbon systems, as opposed to relying on market-based mechanisms. This approach mirrors WWII's successful coordination of industrial production through centralized decision-making and resource allocation.

=== The use of fair share rationing ===
Some climate mobilization plans call for governments to resort to rationing as a way to align consumption with climate and ecological limits. During WW2, rationing was implemented in many countries to divert resources for civilian consumption to the needs of soldiers abroad as well as of these of Allied forces who might be suffering of shortages. It applied to wide range of consumer goods from meat to fuel to shoes to sugar. Rationing was justified by the failure of conventional market mechanisms to adequately and fairly distribute resources. Perceived fairness was deemed necessary to ensure public buy-in for the policy. and advocates of rationing argue that it is a better option than a carbon tax as it treats everyone equally regardless of income and imposes strict limits on total production.

=== Large-scale public finance and investment ===
Mobilization plans typically call for large-scale public financing of climate solutions, similar to WWII's massive government investments in industrial capacity and technological innovation. Increases in corporate taxes and on the highest income earners like was seen during WW2 is also a common characteristic.

== History ==
=== First calls for mobilization ===
Calls for a WW2-scale mobilization in Western anglophone countries by prominent public figures and environmentalists date back to at least 2008. However, the first documented call for such an approach in the English-language was by Canadian historian Dennis Bartels in his 2001 academic article Wartime Mobilization to Counter Severe Global Climate Change published in Human Ecology.

In 2010, Professor Jorgen Randers of the Norwegian School of Management BI and former Greenpeace International executive director Paul Gilding published an paper titled "The one degree war plan" which was the first English-language academic paper to elaborate a draft of what a wartime-like plan for a globally coordinated mobilization to address to climate crisis would look like. The paper proposed the draft plan as starting point for a discussion about what a wartime-like approach to climate policy would look like. Their draft proposed a series of actions to reduce global heat trapping pollution by 50% over a five-year period, improve adaptation, organize and finance the mobilization, and slow global heating through geoengineering or other means. Some of the actions took direct inspiration from WW2, such as the rationing of energy and fuel combustion vehicle use, public education campaigns to encourage thrift and changes in consumption behavior, and the establishment of a "climate war command." The authors argued that such a mobilization would require a change in mindset to how the climate crisis is approached, which they say is exemplified in the WW2 Winston Churchill quote:

It is no use saying, “We are doing our best.” You have got to succeed in doing what is necessary.

Gilding expanded on the plan and the rationale for a mobilization approach in his book The Great Disruption published a year later.

One of the first English-language civil society calls for a wartime-scale mobilization was in 2011 during Chinese President Hu Jintao's visit to the United States. A group of environmental organizations, including Sierra Club, Greenpeace, 350.org, Rainforest Action Network, and prominent environmentalist such as the author Paul Hawken and actor Daryl Hannah, published an open letter calling for the leaders to launch a climate mobilization stating "[c]entral to the solution is a wartime-like mobilization by the governments of the United States and China to cut carbon emissions 80 percent (based on 2006 levels) by 2020." However, specific reference to World War 2 was not made in the letter. The groups did not campaign around a climate mobilization framework after the publication of the letter, neither did they elaborate on what a wartime-like mobilization approach to climate policy would look it.

In 2016, Laurence Delina's book Strategies for Rapid Climate Mitigation Wartime mobilisation as a model for action? was the first academic book published on using lessons from the WW2 home front mobilization and applying them to rapid climate mitigation. Lessons were taken from the U.S., Canadian, and Australian mobilizations.

=== First campaign ===
The first prominent English-language campaign advocating specifically for a WW2-scale climate mobilization was in 2014. That year, the group The Climate Mobilization (TMC) was founded in the United States and advocated for the adoption of the approach by the federal government. The group initiated a pledge that could be signed by anyone that called on the United States government to launch a 10 year WW2-scale mobilization to reach net zero emissions by 2025. Signers of the "Pledge to Mobilize" also pledge to vote for political candidates who signed it over those who didn't. TMC released in 2016 a policy position paper, The Climate Mobilization Victory Plan, which elaborated on what a 10-year wartime-like mobilization to reach net zero emissions would look it, taking inspiration from specific policies implemented during the U.S. WW2 home front mobilization.

In 2018, campaigns for a rapid mobilization to reach net zero emission by 2025 grew when Extinction Rebellion including it as one of their main demands.

In 2019, U.S. Secretary of State John Kerry launched World War Zero, a campaign endorsed by celebrities and a bi-partisan group of politicians. Unlike other groups calling for a climate mobilization framework, the campaign called for net-zero by 2050 and, while it utilized the language and analogy of the wartime effort, did not prescribe specific policies inspired by WW2 home front mobilizations. The website is no longer active.

== Criticisms ==
A number of concerns of the climate mobilization approach to climate policy has been pointed out by commentators, academics, and the authors of the proposals themselves.

In a review of climate mobilization plans, Karvinen and Korhonan point out that published plans rely on the North American WWII home front, exacerbating the divide with the Global South. An approach that demands rapid industrial-scale solutions could be seen as a top-down plan, and one whose priorities might eclipse equity and justice. Without guarantees to ensure sacrifices are shared equally, a climate mobilization approach could deepen inequalities if policies favor the wealthy or burden any marginalized communities.

Other critiques suggest this analogy is flawed because the nature of the climate crisis differs fundamentally from wartime threats. WWII had clearly defined enemies and threats were immediate. Conversely, climate change is systemic crisis with diverse causes and delayed consequences. While public support of WWII was near-unanimous, critics show public opinion remains divided along ideological lines, diluting the notion of a shared "enemy."

In this analogy, framing climate action as a "war" could encourage suspending democratic norms in favor of emergency measures. WWII involved centralized state control, more censorship, and labor restrictions. Declaring climate change an existential threat requiring wartime powers could bypass public debate, suppress dissent, and entrench executive overreach, according to some critics. Advocates push back against these criticisms by emphasizing "cooperation, shared prosperity, accountability, and democratic engagement."

The WWII analogy focuses on large-scale mobilization. The emphasis on the scale can overlook the need for behavioral and cultural shifts. Another consideration for wartime mobilization is the reliance on industrial retooling. repurposing car factories to produce tanks is inherently different than decarbonization requiring long-term structural changes in energy, agriculture, and consumption. The solutions are more demanding which would include reduced consumption, land-use reforms, and systemic economic changes.

== List of proposals ==
A Comparative Review of Climate Mobilization Plans lists twelve mobilization proposals from 2001-2022.

== See also ==
- United States home front during World War II
- Rationing in the United Kingdom
- Rationing in the United States
