= What's Left? =

2006 book by Clive Hamilton

- Author: Clive Hamilton
- Subject: Australian politics
- Published: 2006
- Dewey Decimal: 321.8
- LC Class: DU117

What's Left? The Death of Social Democracy is written by Australian Professor Clive Hamilton and was published as Issue 21 of the Quarterly Essay in 2006. In What's Left? Hamilton comments on topics written about in his previous books Growth Fetish and Affluenza: When Too Much is Never Enough. He argues that there is an emergence of new forms of "alienation and exploitation", and what he calls the ravages of the free market and the profit motive. According to Hamilton, they have "robbed life of its meaning".

Hamilton defines alienation as the inability or incapacity for people to lead authentic lives and to manifest who they are. He contends that there is a massive advertising industry designed to persuade us that the way to a happy and fulfilling life is to "go shopping, to construct an identity, a sense of self, by the brands we buy, by the goods we have and put on display".

== See also ==
- Consumerism
- Overconsumption
