= Anderson School =

Anderson School may refer to:

== In the United States ==
- UCLA Anderson School of Management, Los Angeles, California
- Anderson School (Bozeman, Montana)
- Anderson School of Management (University of New Mexico), Albuquerque, New Mexico
- The Anderson School PS 334, a citywide public K-8 gifted school, New York City
- The Sarah Anderson School, PS 9, a public K-5 school, New York City
- Anderson Private School, White Settlement, Texas
- Anderson School (Bothell, Washington), a bar, restaurant and hotel in a former school building
