= Jean Hudson Boyd =

American judge

323rd District Court, Presiding Judge
- In office January 1, 1995 – December 31, 2014
- Preceded by: Scott D. Moore
- Succeeded by: Timothy A. Menikos

Personal details
- Born: Lucy Jean Hudson; August 26, 1954 (age 71)
- Party: Republican
- Spouse: John G. Boyd (m. 1977)
- Children: 1
- Education: Texas Tech University (BA); South Texas College of Law (JD)

Jean Hudson Boyd (née Lucy Jean Hudson; born August 26, 1954) is an American former judge who served as the Presiding Judge of Texas's 323rd District Court. The 323rd District Court serves Tarrant County, Texas, as its juvenile court. Boyd, a Republican, assumed office in 1995, but is known for her controversial 2013 probation sentencing of Ethan Couch, a 16-year-old who killed four people and injured 11 while driving drunk.

== Education and career ==
Boyd earned a Bachelor's degree from Texas Tech University and a J.D. degree from South Texas College of Law. She practiced law as a juvenile attorney before becoming an Associate Judge of the 323rd District Court in 1987, and the Presiding Judge of the 323rd District Court in 1995. Boyd chairs the Juvenile Justice Committee of the Judicial Section of the State Bar of Texas, and was a member of the Board of the Texas Juvenile Probation Commission. She chaired the Juvenile Law Section of the State Bar of Texas from 1993 to 1994. Boyd served as President of the Fort Worth-Tarrant Count Young Lawyers Association in 1985, and as President of the Tarrant County Women Lawyer's Association from 1982 to 1983.

== Couch case ==
Boyd heard the case of Ethan Couch, a sixteen-year-old from a wealthy family who killed four people and injured nine people while driving drunk, in 2013. After accepting his guilty plea, Boyd sentenced Couch to ten years' probation for his crimes, and also ordered him confined to a rehabilitation facility for treatment. Boyd's ruling outraged the families of the victims, and provoked national criticism, especially after news sources revealed that Couch's defense team argued that he was not culpable because he could not understand the consequences of his decisions because of his financial privilege, a condition an expert witness termed "affluenza."

Boyd herself specifically claimed the "affluenza" argument did not influence her judgment but, rather, that she merely felt Couch needed treatment and that given his parents' financial position, Couch could get better treatment in a rehabilitation center than in a youth detention center. Boyd did not comment regarding whether the punishment of ten years' probation was appropriate to Couch's crimes of stealing alcohol, being a minor in possession of alcohol, consuming alcohol as a minor, driving drunk, and vehicular manslaughter of four individuals.

Critics charged Boyd had given a free pass to Couch because he was white and wealthy, noting that in 2004, Boyd sentenced Eric Miller, a sixteen-year-old from a poor family, to twenty years imprisonment for killing one person while driving drunk. The 2004 case did differ to some extent from the Couch case, though, in that the defendant in the 2004 case committed a separate felony on the night in question, stealing a truck. However, in Couch's case, he had stolen a truck from his father, which was viewed as a lesser offense, and had also stolen the beer he'd consumed. Boyd had intended to pass a similar mandatory rehabilitation sentence in a 2012 case involving a death stemming from a fight, but no rehabilitation program was willing to accept the suspect, who was then subsequently sentenced to 10 years in prison. Boyd has a history of long probationary sentences for juveniles and keeping juveniles in the juvenile court system, although at least one juvenile, convicted of murder, was sentenced to 40 years' imprisonment following his conviction. A year later, Boyd stepped down from her position officially on December 31, 2014, after serving as judge for 20 years.

Two years into the 10-year probation sentence handed down by Boyd, Couch violated his probation and disappeared with his mother. On December 28, 2015, Mexican authorities detained Couch and his mother near the Pacific beach resort town of Puerto Vallarta.

== Personal life ==
Lucy Jean Hudson married John G. Boyd, D.D.S., in 1977 and the two have a child.

== Awards ==
- Silver Gavel Award (2011), selected by the Texas Center for the Judiciary
