= 48 Group =

48 Group may refer to:

- AKB48 Group, sister groups under AKS based in Japan
- SNH48 Group, sister groups under Star48 based in China
- BNK48 Group, sister groups under IAM based in Thailand
- 48 Group Club, China-U.K. trade promotion organization
