= Robin Rosenberg =

Robin Rosenberg may refer to:

- Robin L. Rosenberg (born 1962), American judge
- Robin S. Rosenberg, American psychologist involved in the Ethan Couch case
