= Escape from Affluenza =

- Narrated by: Wanda Urbanska
- Release date: 1998
- Country: United States

Escape from Affluenza is a 1998 PBS 56-minute documentary film produced as a sequel to the 1997 documentary Affluenza. While the original concentrates on affluenza—consumerism and materialism in modern society—the sequel focuses on how to avoid this. It looks at stories of how to reduce debt, stress, time-pressure, and possession-overload.

The cast includes Wanda Urbanska as the host and Cecile Andrews, author of "Circle of Simplicity".
