= The Big Fix =

The Big Fix may refer to:

- The Big Fix (1947 film), an American crime film directed by James Flood
- The Big Fix (1978 film), a comedy-thriller film directed by Jeremy Kagan
- The Big Fix (2012 film), a documentary film surrounding the Deepwater Horizon oil spill
- The Big Fix (upcoming film), an American crime thriller film directed by Baltasar Kormákur
- "The Big Fix" (South Park), a 2022 episode of the American TV series South Park

== See also ==
- A Big Fix, a 2005 book by Ian Lowe
