= Requiem for a Species =

Book by Clive Hamilton

Requiem for a species : why we resist the truth about climate change
- Author: Clive Hamilton
- Subject: Climatic changes—Social aspects Global warming—Social aspects Twenty-first century—Forecasts
- Publisher: Earthscan
- Publication date: 7 April 2010
- Pages: 286 pp.
- ISBN: 978-1-84971-081-7
- OCLC: 489636734
- Dewey Decimal: 363.738
- LC Class: QC903 .H2185 2010

Requiem for a Species: Why We Resist the Truth about Climate Change is a 2010 non-fiction book by Australian academic Clive Hamilton which explores climate change denial and its implications. It argues that climate change will bring about large-scale, harmful consequences for habitability for life on Earth including humans, which it is too late to prevent. Hamilton explores why politicians, corporations and the public deny or refuse to act on this reality. He invokes a variety of explanations, including wishful thinking, ideology, consumer culture and active lobbying by the fossil fuel industry. The book builds on the author's fifteen-year prior history of writing about these subjects, with previous books including Growth Fetish and Scorcher: The Dirty Politics of Climate Change.

Requiem for a Species has been reviewed in Resurgence magazine, Socialist Review, Sydney Morning Herald, The Age, The Common Review, and Times Higher Education, which named it "Book of the Week". Extracts of the book have appeared in The Guardian and Geographical magazine. The book won a 2010 Queensland Premier's Literary Award.

== Themes ==
Hamilton points out that there have been many reports and books over the years explaining the climate change problem and just how ominous the future looks for humanity. He says Requiem for a Species is primarily about why those warnings have been ignored.

Hamilton considers that sometimes an inconvenient truth may be too difficult to bear:

Sometimes facing up to the truth is just too hard. When the facts are distressing it is easier to reframe or ignore them. Around the world only a few have truly faced up to the facts about global warming... It's the same with our own deaths; we all "accept" that we will die, but it is only when our death is imminent that we confront the true meaning of our mortality.

The most immediate reason for the failure to act on global warming is seen to be the "sustained and often ruthless exercise of political power by the corporations who stand to lose from a shift to low- and zero-carbon energy systems". Hamilton cites numerous journalists and authors who have documented the influence of large companies such as ExxonMobil, Rio Tinto Group and General Motors. Hamilton makes his argument in three stages:

Firstly, he reviews the evidence about how serious the situation is already and how much worse it will get. Secondly, he examines the roots of denial, both in terms of resistance to the evidence and in relation to the actors and agencies motivated to deny climate change. Lastly, he looks at some future scenarios and explains what people should do.

Hamilton suggests that the foundations of climate change denial lie in the reaction of American conservatism to the collapse of the Soviet Union in 1991. He argues that as the "red menace" receded, conservatives who had put energy into opposing communism sought other outlets. Hamilton contends that the conservative backlash against climate science was led by three prominent physicists – Frederick Seitz, Robert Jastrow, and William Nierenberg. In 1984 Seitz, Jastrow and Nierenberg founded the George C. Marshall Institute, and in the 1990s the Marshall Institute's main activity was attacking climate science.

When describing climate science, Hamilton says that official numbers published by the Intergovernmental Panel on Climate Change (IPCC) are highly cautious, and so the real effects of climate change will likely be even more severe. His conclusion is that it will not be possible to stabilise emissions:

... even with the most optimistic set of assumptions – the ending of deforestation, a halving of emissions associated with food production, global emissions peaking in 2020 and then falling by 3 per cent a year for a few decades – we have no chance of preventing emissions rising well above a number of critical tipping points that will spark uncontrollable climate change. The Earth's climate would enter a chaotic era lasting thousands of years before natural processes eventually establish some sort of equilibrium. Whether human beings would still be a force on the planet, or even survive, is a moot point. One thing seems certain: there will be far fewer of us.

In terms of Australia, Hamilton says that "Australians in 2050 will be living in a nation transformed by a changing climate, with widespread doubt over whether we will make it to the end of the century in a land that is recognisably Australian".

== Reception ==
Michael Lynn in The Common Review says that Requiem for a Species explores the gulf between acknowledgment and acceptance of climate change. Lynn explains that the gulf has two main origins and no easy solution:

Hamilton ... argues that the gulf has two primary origins: the enormity of its consequences and the way it challenges how we as individuals and as societies have constructed our identities over the past three centuries. In doing so, he suggests that meeting the challenge of climate change requires far more than implementing the right policies and making minor adjustments in our lifestyles. Instead, it implies remaking our psyches and societies on a scale unseen since the dawn of the modern age.

The Times Higher Education listed Requiem for a Species as "Book of the week" for 3 June 2010. Steven Yearley's review calls it a "provocative and sobering book". He says the heart of the book are the many explanations that Hamilton puts forward for the everyday, regular denial of the danger of changing climate. Yearley says this is also the most frustrating aspect of Requiem for a Species, because Hamilton proposes so many different explanations but does not make their relative significance clear.

David Shearman, in a review for Doctors for the Environment Australia, says that "Clive Hamilton is one of Australia's most notable public intellectuals, his work is careful and balanced, he presents the facts as they are and has written a book which is uncomfortable for all". According to Shearman, Hamilton's treatment of the topic of denial is one of the best available.

Mike Hulme, in Resurgence magazine, agrees with the "consumption fetish" and "spiritual malaise" of humanity that Hamilton describes. But, according to Hulme, Hamilton has underestimated the "innovative and creative potential of collective humanity" and he has put too much faith in the infallibility of science's predictions about future climate risks. Hulme believes that Hamilton "is placing too much weight on the foresight of science to provide his desired revolution, rather than calling for it more honestly and directly through political, psychological or spiritual engagement".

Kelsey Munro reviewed the book in the Sydney Morning Herald and The Age, suggesting that it is pessimistic and does not present any false hope. But he says pessimism is not the same thing as fatalism, and Hamilton believes there is still an urgent need for government intervention to avoid worst-case scenarios by reducing emissions. Munro also points out that some eminent climate scientists, like Princeton University's Michael Oppenheimer, remain optimistic that humanity will act before it is too late.

Camilla Royle reviewed Requiem for a Species in Socialist Review and recommends it for those who want to get a clearer idea of climate change science. She says that Hamilton is understandably angry at the corporate lobbyists who have encouraged climate change denial. Royle suggests that Hamilton accepts that "we should at least try to do something about climate change", but he "doesn't give much idea of what that something is".

There was a book launch for Requiem for a Species on 24 March 2010 at The University of Queensland and another on 29 March 2010 at the Australian National University (ANU). An extract of the book appeared in The Guardian on 16 April 2010. Geographical magazine published another extract in August 2010. The book won the 2010 "Queensland Premier's Literary Award for a work Advancing Public Debate".

== Author ==
At the time of publication, Clive Hamilton was Professor of Public Ethics at the Centre for Applied Philosophy and Public Ethics (CAPPE) at Australia. Before taking up his position at CAPPE, he was executive director and founder of The Australia Institute, a forward-looking think tank.

== Publishing information ==
- Hamilton, Clive (2010). Requiem for a Species: Why We Resist the Truth about Climate Change. Earthscan. ISBN 978-1-84971-081-7.

The book is available as an eBook document as well as a paper publication.

== See also ==
- An Inconvenient Truth
- Climate Code Red: The Case for Emergency Action
- Greenhouse Mafia
- Greenhouse Solutions with Sustainable Energy
- Low-carbon economy
- Merchants of Doubt
- Why We Disagree About Climate Change
- Global catastrophic risk
- Scientific consensus on climate change
- Willful blindness
