= Trial and sentencing of Robert H. Richards IV =

Trial of child rapist

Robert H. Richards IV (born 1966/1967) is a convicted child rapist and great-grandson of chemical magnate Irénée du Pont and an heir to the du Pont family fortune.

== Biography ==
Richards is the son of Robert H. Richards III and Mariana, daughter of Mariana DuPont Silliman. He lives in Delaware, and owns three homes, located in Greenville and North Shores. He married Tracy Richards, but they later divorced.

== Rape conviction and allegations ==
In 2009, Richards entered a guilty plea and was convicted of raping his three-year-old daughter, after the girl reported the abuse to her grandmother. Instead of serving out his eight-year prison sentence, the sentencing order signed by Delaware Superior Court Judge Jan R. Jurden reportedly considered that the "defendant will not fare well" in prison and the eight-year sentence was suspended. Delaware Public Defender Brendan J. O'Neill expressed surprise that Jurden would use such a rationale to avoid sending Richards to prison. According to ABA Journal, Judge Jurden "didn't say 'he will not fare well in prison' during the hearing", but the phrase appeared in the notes section of the sentencing order, and may have reflected arguments made by the defense lawyer. The sentencing occurred as part of a plea deal, where Richards had to register as a sex offender, attend rehabilitation therapy and promise not to have any contact with the victim or anyone under the age of 16.

In 2010, allegations were made that Richards had also molested his son beginning in December 2005 and continuing for two years. Police and prosecutors investigated but did not find sufficient evidence to pursue charges. Delaware Attorney General Beau Biden later defended the sentencing of Richards to probation, saying there was a strong chance of the prosecution losing at trial making a plea bargain necessary, noting the weakness of the evidence. Although Richards was ordered by Jurden to go through in-patient treatment at a Massachusetts facility, he has failed to do so.

In 2014, Richards's former wife, Tracy Richards, filed a lawsuit seeking damages for the abuse of his daughter. The lawsuit also claims that the polygraph tests Richards took in April 2010 during his probation supported allegations that he had molested his son. These reports were provided to Jurden. In April 2014, Superior Court Judge Richard F. Stokes denied Richards's request to seal the court files, stating that the proceedings were open to the public and this was a First Amendment issue. By the end of June 2014, it was reported that a sealed confidential settlement had been reached on the lawsuit.

Critics questioned whether Richards's wealth and prominence led to unfair preference in the legal system. The case was compared to Ethan Couch, whose "affluenza" defense infamously earned him probation for killing four people while driving intoxicated.
