= Ben Oquist =

Political analyst and commentator

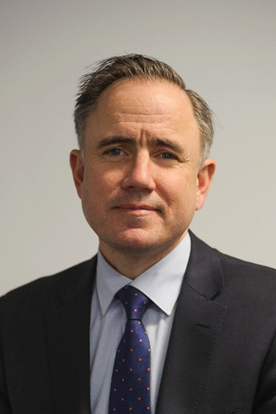
- Ben Oquist
- Born: Benjamin Richard Oquist; 1968 or 1969 (age 57–58)
- Occupations: policy analyst, commentator and political and communications strategist
- Spouse: Sarah Hanson-Young (m. 2022)
- Children: One daughter, one step-daughter

Benjamin Richard Oquist (born 1968 or 1969) is an Australian political lobbyist, analyst, commentator and communications strategist.

Oquist was (2015 to 2022) the executive director of The Australia Institute, an independent Australian think tank conducting public policy research on a range of economic, social, transparency and environmental issues.

In October 2018, The Australian Financial Review listed Oquist and Richard Denniss of The Australia Institute in equal tenth-place on their 'Covert Power' list of the most powerful people in Australia. In February 2022, Oquist was included in The Australian's list of Australia's top 100 Green Power Players.

== Career ==
A 15-year career with Greens leader Bob Brown was broken briefly by a two-year stint with the public affairs company Essential Media Communications. Joining The Australia Institute in 2014, Oquist became executive director in 2015. He is currently working as a director for lobbying firm DPG Advisory Solutions.

=== The Australian Greens ===
Oquist began working with the Australian Greens in 1996 for both Dee Margetts and Bob Brown. Brown has described Oquist as a "friend and confidant" but also as "a core factor in the Greens becoming the third-largest party in Australian politics". In a 2014 radio interview, Brown stated that Oquist's approach to strategy aligned with that of his own. Oquist was reported to have been favoured by Brown for preselection as Greens senator for NSW in 2003. Upon the resignation of Senator Bob Brown on 13 April 2012, Oquist became chief of staff for the new leader, Christine Milne.

In September 2013, Oquist was implicated in an attempt to unseat the then leader of the Australian Greens, Christine Milne. It was reported that Oquist was motivated to attempt to remove Milne before she restructured the organisation to remove his influence. Senator Milne had described him as an adherent to a hierarchical administrative structure, citing this as the reason behind his subsequent departure from his role on the Greens staff. His subsequent commencement with the Australia Institute aligned him with the economist and then executive director of the Australia Institute Richard Denniss. Denniss was also an outspoken critic of Christine Milne and a former Australian Greens staffer.

=== The Australia Institute ===
==== Al Gore, Clive Palmer and carbon tax repeal ====
In July 2014 Oquist, at that time a strategy director of The Australia Institute, was named as a party to the meeting between former US Democratic presidential candidate Al Gore and Clive Palmer. The meeting was instrumental in a deal brokered between the leader of the Palmer United Party, Clive Palmer, and the federal government of Australia for the concessional repeal of the carbon tax. Oquist's role in the context of the repeal was widely reported to be one of pragmatism, driven by a focus on gaining support in particular for the mandated Renewable Energy Target which in 2014 was thought to be under imminent threat. Following the demise of the Palmer United Party senate voting block in 2014 the deal collapsed. However, the newly constituted Senate crossbench did not vote to repeal the RET. The Carbon Pricing Scheme was abolished on 17 July 2014. Oquist's role in these events remains controversial as Palmer stood to benefit financially from the repeal through his ownership of a coal refinery.

=== DPG Advisory Solutions ===
Oquist currently works as the director of climate and ESG (environmental, social, and governance) at lobbying firm DPG Advisory Solutions which represents clients including Rio Tinto, Uber and Wesfarmers.

== Personal ==
Oquist's engagement to Greens Senator Sarah Hanson-Young was announced on 15 February 2022. Their marriage was held at Lobethal Road Winery in the Adelaide Hills on the Saturday of the Easter long weekend.

In 2025, it was revealed that Hanson-Young, had charged $50,000 in 'family reunion" flights for Oquist to travel from his home in Adelaide to Canberra, where he works. The allowance was used by Hanson-Young for over 100 family flights between 2022 - 2025.
