= Activist Wisdom =

2005 book by Sarah Maddison and Sean Scalmer

Activist Wisdom: Practical knowledge and creative tension in social movements
- Author: Sarah Maddison, Sean Scalmer
- Publication date: October 2005
- ISBN: 9-780-86840686-2

Activist Wisdom: Practical knowledge and Creative Tension in Social Movements is a book by Sarah Maddison and Sean Scalmer. UNSW Press, 2005. ISBN 978-0-86840-686-2

Peace marches, protest demonstrations and campaigns have often been part of the Australian social and political landscape. This book includes interviews with some of Australia's best-known activists and provides a bigger picture that analyses successes and failures, communication of ideas, and political impacts.

== See also ==
- Activism
- Silencing Dissent: How the Australian Government Is Controlling Public Opinion and Stifling Debate
