= Ethan Couch =

American convicted of manslaughter (born 1997)

- Born: Ethan Anthony Couch; April 11, 1997 (age 29); Tarrant County, Texas, U.S.
- Occupation: Employee at family's sheet metal business
- Known for: Defense of "affluenza" against charge of intoxication manslaughter
- Parents: Tonya Couch (mother); Frederick Couch (father)
- Status: Released
- Convictions: Intoxication manslaughter (4 counts), intoxication assault (2 counts)
- Penalty: 10 years probation; later 1 year, 11 months, and 25 days in jail added due to a probation violation

Details
- Date: June 15, 2013
- Country: United States
- State: Texas
- Killed: 4
- Injured: 8
- Date apprehended: After fleeing to Mexico on probation violation, December 28, 2015

Ethan Anthony Couch (born April 11, 1997) is an American criminal who killed four people at the age of 16 while driving under the influence on June 15, 2013, in Burleson, Texas. Couch, while intoxicated and under the influence of drugs, was driving on a restricted license and speeding in a residential area when he lost control of his vehicle, which slammed into a group of people assisting another driver with a disabled car. The collision killed four people and injured nine others. Two passengers in Couch's pickup truck were critically injured, one of whom was completely paralyzed.

Couch was indicted on four counts of intoxication manslaughter for recklessly driving under the influence. In December 2013, Judge Jean Hudson Boyd sentenced Couch to ten years of probation, subsequently ordering him to undergo therapy at a long term inpatient facility. Before sentencing, Couch's attorneys had argued that Couch had "affluenza" and needed rehabilitation instead of prison, arguing that Couch had no understanding of boundaries as his affluent parents had never given him any. Couch's sentence, judged by many as outrageously lenient, set off what The New York Times called "an emotional, angry debate that has stretched far beyond the North Texas suburbs".

On December 11, 2015, after a video was posted online purporting to show Couch drinking at a party, he became the subject of a manhunt, and was listed in the National Fugitive Database after attempts by his probation officer to contact him failed. On December 28, 2015, authorities detained Couch and his mother in the Mexican resort city of Puerto Vallarta, Jalisco. On April 13, 2016, Couch was sentenced to serve two years in prison, and was released in 2018.

== Early life ==
Couch's parents are Fred and Tonya Couch. Fred founded Cleburne Metal Works, a metal roofing company, in 1986, and Tonya was a nurse before her license was revoked in 2012. Couch grew up in Burleson and previously attended Anderson Private School. Couch drove himself to school at the age of thirteen; when this was questioned by the principal his father responded by threatening to buy the school. Couch then withdrew from Anderson and began attending a co-op based in nearby Watauga until age 15, when he enrolled in a community college.

At the age of 15, Couch was cited for "minor in consumption of alcohol" and "minor in possession of alcohol", after he was caught in a parked pickup truck with a naked, unconscious 14-year-old girl. He pleaded no contest and was sentenced to probation, a compulsory alcohol awareness class, and 12 hours of community service.

=== Family history ===
His parents – who divorced in 2017 – have also each had legal problems, publicized in the media following their son's conviction.

==== Fred Couch ====
Fred Couch has been charged with evading arrest, theft by check, and assault against his then-wife Tonya, and was convicted of misdemeanor assault in 2000. On August 19, 2014, he was arrested for impersonating a police officer, allegedly displaying a fake badge during a disturbance call, and was later found guilty and sentenced to a year of probation in December 2016. In February 2016, police were called to his home after he allegedly choked his girlfriend, but no charges were filed. In September 2019, he was charged with assault, allegedly having choked his girlfriend with his hands that July.

==== Tonya Couch ====
In 2013, Tonya Couch was sentenced to a $500 fine and a six-month community supervision order for reckless driving when she used her vehicle to force another motorist off the road.

== Crash ==
On the evening of June 15, 2013, according to authorities and trial testimony, Couch was witnessed on surveillance video stealing two cases of beer from a Walmart store, driving with seven passengers in his father's red 2012 Ford F-350 pickup truck, and speeding at 70 miles per hour (110 km/h) in a designated 40-mile-per-hour (64 km/h) zone.

Approximately an hour after the beer theft, Couch was driving his father's truck at 70 miles per hour (110 km/h) on rural, two-lane Burleson-Retta Road where motorist Breanna Mitchell's sport utility vehicle had stalled. Hollie Boyles and her daughter Shelby, who lived nearby, had come out to help her, as had passing youth minister Brian Jennings. Couch's truck swerved off the road and into Mitchell's sport utility vehicle, then crashed into Jennings' parked car, which in turn hit an oncoming Volkswagen Beetle. Couch's truck then flipped over and struck a tree. Mitchell, Jennings, and both Boyles were pronounced dead at the scene on the arrival of paramedics near the rural road. However, Couch and his seven teenage passengers, none of whom were wearing seat belts, survived. The two children in Jennings' car and the two people in the Volkswagen also survived. Two of those who survived the crash were critically injured. Couch was not seriously injured in the crash. He and a few of his seven passengers were sent directly to hospitals for treatment, along with a few others who were present in both cars.

Three hours after the incident, Couch, who was 16 at the time of the incident, had a blood alcohol content of 0.24%, three times the legal limit for adult drivers (21+ years old) in Texas, and he also tested positive for marijuana and diazepam.

== Trial and sentencing ==
Couch was charged with four counts of intoxication manslaughter and two counts of intoxication assault. Couch entered a guilty plea, and Tarrant County prosecutors were seeking a maximum sentence of 20 years' imprisonment for Couch.

G. Dick Miller, a psychologist hired as an expert by the defense, testified in court that the teen was a product of "affluenza" and was unable to link his actions with consequences because of his parents teaching him that wealth buys privilege. It was initially reported that, as part of his sentencing, their son would be sent for teen substance abuse and mental health rehabilitation to Newport Academy, an upscale residential treatment center in Newport Beach, California with costs upwards of $450,000, annually.

Following a court hearing closed to the public, Judge Boyd instead sentenced Couch to an unspecified lock-down rehabilitation facility at his parents' expense; the time Couch would have to stay there was also unspecified. Couch was ordered to stay away from drugs, alcohol, and driving. A hearing on April 11, 2014, revealed that on February 19, 2014, Couch had begun treatment "at the North Texas State Hospital, a state-owned inpatient mental health facility" in Vernon, Texas. Although the daily rate for the treatment facility is $715, Couch's parents were ordered to pay just $1,170 per month for his stay there, based on the state's sliding-scale payment schedule. The amount ordered is the maximum allowed on the payment schedule. Couch's parents promised in court to pay the requested fee for their son's treatment.

At least one relative of the crash victims protested the lightness of Couch's sentence and his lack of remorse.

== Reaction ==
Following the probation sentence, the Tarrant County District Attorney's office asked a juvenile judge to incarcerate Couch, on two counts of intoxication assault, saying there had been no verdict formally entered for those charges and "every case deserves a verdict."

One psychologist who disagreed with Couch's sentence—Dr. Suniya S. Luthar, who specializes in "the costs of affluence in suburban communities"—maintains that research shows feelings of entitlement among affluent youth are a social problem, and that "we are setting a double standard for the rich and poor." Luthar asked, "What is the likelihood if this was an African-American, inner-city kid that grew up in a violent neighborhood to a single mother who is addicted to crack and he was caught two or three times ... what is the likelihood that the judge would excuse his behavior and let him off because of how he was raised?"

Writing in The Guardian, Texas student Jessica Luther points out that Couch's family's ability to pay for private therapy, i.e., their wealth, was intrinsic to the judge's reasoning for giving Couch a light sentence. An offender without his means would end up in the overcrowded, publicly supported Texas juvenile justice system where (the judge noted) Couch "might not get the kind of intensive therapy in a state-run program that he could receive at the California facility suggested by his attorneys".

Another psychologist—Robin S. Rosenberg—has argued that Miller's defense makes no sense because Couch could have learned that bad behavior has consequences in other areas of his life, and that a sentence to a luxurious rehabilitation home reinforces the message "that his wealth and privilege can obviate the negative consequences of his criminal behavior".

Critics complained that the presiding judge—District Judge Jean Boyd—had given a much harsher sentence to another 16-year-old intoxicated driver 10 years earlier, who killed one person. In February 2004, Boyd sentenced Eric Bradlee Miller, who stole a truck and killed a 19-year-old father, to 20 years telling him, "the court is aware you had a sad childhood ... I hope you will take advantage of the services [offered by the Texas Youth Commission] and turn your life around." Eric Bradlee Miller had killed one person, not four, and had a much lower blood alcohol level (0.11% compared to Couch's 0.24%), but was from a much poorer family.

According to The New York Times, however, it is unclear what, if any, part, Couch's family's wealth played in his sentence. "[I]t is not uncommon for minors involved in serious drunken-driving cases and other crimes to receive probation instead of prison time", and the sentence may be part of "a growing trend of giving a young person a second chance through rehabilitation instead of trying him as an adult". Boyd had a history of attempting to place youths in rehabilitation rather than jail.

The leading Republican and Democratic candidates in the 2014 Texas gubernatorial election, respectively, Greg Abbott and Wendy Davis, commented on the sentence. Davis referred to it as a "disgrace" and Abbott, then-Texas Attorney General, said his office was looking to appeal the case.

At a February 5, 2014 hearing, Eric Boyles, who lost his wife and daughter in the crash, said "Had he not had money to have the defense there, to also have the experts testify, and also offer to pay for the treatment, I think the results would have been different."

== Lawsuits ==
Five civil lawsuits were filed by families of the four victims and two of the passengers between September and November 2013, against Couch, his family, and Cleburne Metal Works (doing business as Cleburne Sheet Metal, as the truck's registered owner). An additional lawsuit was filed in December 2013, by the family of Isaiah McLaughlin, a passenger in Jennings' vehicle. The lawsuits were filed by:

- Eric and Marguerite Boyles, husband and daughter of victim Hollie Boyles, and father and sister to victim Shelby Boyles
- Marla Mitchell, mother of victim Breanna Mitchell
- Shaunna Jennings, wife of victim Brian Jennings
- Maria Lemus and Sergio Molina, parents of injured passenger Sergio E. Molina
- Kevin and Alesia McConnell, parents of Lucas McConnell, who was a passenger in Jennings' vehicle and was injured but survived
- Timothy and Priscilla McLaughlin, parents of Isaiah McLaughlin, who was another passenger in Jennings' vehicle and was also injured but survived

The first lawsuit was filed by Maria Lemus and Sergio Molina on behalf of their son, Sergio E. Molina, who was riding in the bed of Couch's truck and suffered a traumatic brain injury. According to the suit petition, Molina's medical expenses exceeded an estimated $600,000 at the time and could top $10 million if he needs round-the-clock care.

Five of the six suits (all those except the McLaughlin suit) were consolidated in January 2014 to save court costs. The McLaughlin and Mitchell suits were settled out-of-court by March 2014, and Sergio Molina's family reached an out-of-court settlement in May 2014. By November 2014, all of the suits had been settled with the exception of the suit by McConnell, who had requested a jury trial. In the McConnell suit, lawyers for the defendants filed a petition for a writ of mandamus in July 2014 to prevent access to the records of Dr. Miller; the emergency stay was granted by the Texas Court of Appeals in August, but mandamus was subsequently denied in September. The McConnell suit was settled in October 2015.

== Fugitive status and capture ==
In late 2015, authorities began investigating a claim made on Twitter on December 2, 2015. The user posted a video along with a caption stating that Couch was in violation of his probation. The video shows several young people playing beer pong at a party, one of whom appears to be Couch. Drinking was a direct violation of Couch's 10 year probation. Consequences could have included a re-sentencing, which could mean a maximum of 10 years' imprisonment, according to the Tarrant County District Attorney's Office.

A warrant was issued for Couch on December 11, 2015, after his probation officer could not reach him. On December 18, 2015, Couch and his mother were reported as missing, and as having not been reached after failing to make contact with Couch's probation officer. The fugitive hunt for Couch became a federal matter in December 2015 with the U.S. Marshals Service, FBI, and other agencies joining the hunt for the suspect who was believed to have fled the country. A $5,000 reward for information leading to the whereabouts or arrest of Ethan Couch was offered.

Couch and his mother were discovered and arrested in Puerto Vallarta, in Jalisco, Mexico on December 28, 2015. Mexican authorities transported the pair to immigration offices in Guadalajara for deportation to the United States. Ethan Couch won a delay in his deportation, based on a constitutional appeal in Mexico (see recurso de amparo), and was transported to a detention facility in Mexico City. His mother was deported on December 30 aboard a commercial flight to Los Angeles International Airport and arrested upon arrival on December 31 by the Los Angeles Police Department on a felony charge of hindering apprehension of a felon. She was initially being held on $1 million bail, but after her transfer back to Tarrant County, a judge dropped her bail to $75,000, and she was released from jail on January 12, having posted bond.

Couch, having dropped his fight to avoid being deported from Mexico, was flown back to the United States on January 28, 2016, and was held in custody before appearing at a hearing on February 19 regarding his original juvenile probation case being transferred to the adult court system. The case was transferred to the adult court system on February 19, 2016, and the court stated that probation would continue into 2024. On April 13, 2016, state District Judge Wayne Salvant sentenced Couch to four consecutive terms of 180 days in jail (720 days in total) – one for each of the 2013 car crash victims – in light of him fleeing to Mexico.

== Release ==
Couch was released from jail on April 2, 2018. Upon his release, he was required to wear an ankle monitor and an alcohol detection patch and to submit to drug testing and conform to a 9 p.m. curfew. He is permitted to drive and has a video-equipped ignition interlock device installed in his vehicle, which will prevent him from starting his car without passing a breathalyzer test, according to Mike Simonds of the Tarrant County Sheriff's Office.

The non-profit organization Mothers Against Drunk Drivers (MADD) criticized Couch's release as a "grave injustice", vowing to keep a close eye on his case:

The 720 days Ethan Couch served for his crimes shows that drunk driving homicides still aren't treated as the violent crimes that they are ... We will be watching, because this case brought to light that there is so much more work to be done to hold drunk drivers accountable.

— MADD, Statement in response to Ethan Couch, the 'affluenza teen's' release from jail

On March 18, 2019, a Tarrant County judge allowed Couch to remove the GPS ankle monitor, but the other conditions of his probation were not lifted. The Tarrant County District Attorney's Office said they were not notified about the decision. Couch was re-arrested on January 2, 2020, accused of violating his probation, and was booked into the Tarrant County Jail. According to court documents Couch tested positive for THC in a mandatory drug screening that was part of his probation. Couch was released one day later, on January 3, 2020, because authorities could not determine if the positive test result for THC came from illegal marijuana or CBD oil.

== See also ==
- Robert H. Richards IV
- Brock Turner
