= 48 Group Club =

UK private company

The 48 Group Club
- Formation: 1954; 72 years ago
- Founder: Jack Perry
- Type: Private company limited by shares
- Registration no.: 09417061
- Headquarters: London, United Kingdom
- Chairman: Stephen Lawrence Andrew Perry
- Website: www.the48groupclub.com
- Formerly called: 48 Group of British Traders with China

The 48 Group Club (originally the 48 Group of British Traders with China) is a London-based private company dedicated to promoting trade between the People's Republic of China (PRC) and the United Kingdom. The group is named after a British trade delegation of 48 businessmen, referred to as the "Icebreakers", who travelled to China in 1954 to establish trade relations between the two countries. The organisation's motto, "Equality and Mutual Benefit", is derived from a remark by Zhou Enlai, the first premier of the PRC. Some analysts have stated that the organisation has functioned as a platform for the Chinese Communist Party (CCP) to influence British elites.

Fellows of the 48 Group Club have included Tony Blair, Jack Straw, Alex Salmond, Peter Mandelson, Ken Livingstone and other politicians, retired diplomats and prominent business executives. The 48 Group Club's chairman, Stephen Perry, has been a proponent of the Belt and Road Initiative and his commentary has been published by Chinese state media outlets. In February 2020, Perry commented positively on the PRC's response to the COVID-19 pandemic and stated that the Chinese government had shown "incredible sensitivity to the needs of the people".

In 2023, Yang Tengbo, an honorary board member of the 48 Group Club who has ties to Andrew Mountbatten-Windsor, was banned from entering the UK on national security grounds. Yang's appeal in 2024 was rejected by a UK tribunal. The 48 Group Club stated that Yang "has never had any involvement with the work of the 48 Group". In 2026, it was reported that a former 48 Group Club member, Guren "Bobby" Zhou, invested US$100 million in World Liberty Financial, a business venture of the Trump family.

== Criticism ==
In Hidden Hand: Exposing How the Chinese Communist Party Is Reshaping the World, authors Clive Hamilton and Mareike Ohlberg stated:

In short, at the instigation of a member of the Standing Committee of the Politburo, Zhou Enlai, the 48 Group was the work of three secret members of the Communist Party of Great Britain. From this foundation the club quickly developed an unrivalled level of trust and intimacy with the top leadership of the CCP, and has built itself into the most powerful instrument of Beijing's influence and intelligence gathering in the United Kingdom. Reaching into the highest ranks of Britain's political, business, media and university elites, the club plays a decisive role in shaping British attitudes to China.

=== Failed libel lawsuit ===
In June 2020, the 48 Group Club and its chairman, Stephen Perry, launched a libel lawsuit in an unsuccessful attempt to block the publication of Hidden Hand in Canada, the United Kingdom, and the United States.

== See also ==
- Society for Anglo-Chinese Understanding
- Chinese People's Association for Friendship with Foreign Countries
- Chinese espionage in the United Kingdom
