= Mareike Ohlberg =

21st-century German sinologist

- Other names: 马晓月
- Education: Heidelberg University (BA, PhD); Columbia University (MA)
- Occupation: Sinologist
- Employer: German Marshall Fund
- Organization: Inter-Parliamentary Alliance on China

Mareike Ohlberg is a German sinologist currently serving as a senior fellow in the Indo-Pacific program at the German Marshall Fund of the United States (GMF), based in GMF's Berlin office. She is also an advisor to the Inter-Parliamentary Alliance on China.

== Education ==
Ohlberg holds a BA and PhD in Chinese studies from Heidelberg University, and a MA in East Asian regional studies with a focus on modern China from Columbia University in the United States.

== Career ==
Prior to joining GMF, Mareike was an analyst at the Mercator Institute for China Studies focusing on China's digital policies and Chinese Communist Party’s influence operations in Europe; An Wang postdoctoral fellow at Harvard's Fairbank Center for Chinese Studies; and a postdoctoral fellow at Shih-Hsin University.

== Publications ==
=== Books ===
- Hidden Hand: Exposing How the Chinese Communist Party Is Reshaping the World (2020) (co-authored with Clive Hamilton)

=== Reports ===
- United Front Work and Political Influence Operations in Sub-Saharan Africa, National Bureau of Asian Research, June 1, 2022

=== Articles ===
- Why China Is Freaking Out Over Biden’s Democracy Summit, Foreign Policy, December 10, 2021 (co-authored with Bonnie S. Glaser)
- China’s Biosecurity State in Xinjiang Is Powered by Western Tech, Foreign Policy, February 19, 2020 (co-authored with Jessica Batke)

=== US Congressional testimonies ===
- “Testimony before the U.S.-China Economic and Security Review Commission” Hearing on “China’s Global Influence and Interference Activities”, March 23, 2023
