= Anderson Private School =

School in Texas, United States

Coordinates: 32.783957°N 97.577233°W

Anderson Private School for the Gifted, Talented and Creative is a private school in Fort Worth, Texas. The school accepts students ages 4–16 and does not use grade levels. Students by 16 are typically dual enrolled in Anderson and a local college. Typically the total student body is 20–25.

== History ==
Dr. William and LeVonna Anderson, the cofounders of the school, began planning for it in 1983, and the school first opened in 1995.

== Notable alumni ==
- Ethan Couch - did not graduate, killed four people while driving under the influence of alcohol and drugs, commonly known as "affluenza" teen.
