= Silent Invasion (book) =

2018 book by Clive Hamilton

Silent Invasion: China's Influence in Australia
- Author: Clive Hamilton
- Language: English
- Subject: Chinese Communist Party, Australia–China relations, Chinese Australians, Chinese dissidents
- Genre: Non-fiction
- Set in: Australia and the People's Republic of China
- Publisher: Hardie Grant
- Publication date: 22 February 2018
- Publication place: Australia
- Pages: 376
- ISBN: 9781743794807 (Paperback)
- Followed by: Hidden Hand: Exposing How The Chinese Communist Party Is Reshaping The World

Silent Invasion: China's Influence in Australia is a 2018 book by Clive Hamilton and is about the growing influence of the Chinese Communist Party (CCP) in Australian politics and civil society. The book details systematic attempts by the government of the People's Republic of China to expand its influence and espionage network in Australia. The author alleges that this is causing "the erosion of Australian sovereignty".

== Publication ==
=== Original ===
In the book's initial publication in November 2017 was delayed due to legal concerns by the initial publishers, Allen & Unwin, that they “would be targeted by Beijing and its proxies in Australia.” The book was published after Hardie Grant Books agreed to publish the book.

=== Chinese translation ===
The Chinese translation is not available in Simplified Chinese but available in Traditional Chinese, and it was published by Zuoan Wenhua Publishing as Silent Invasion: The China Factor in Australia (無聲的入侵：中國因素在澳洲; ISBN 9789865727833) on 20 March 2019.

=== Japanese translation ===
The Japanese translation was published by Asuka Shinsha Publishing as Invisible Invasion: The China’s Campaign to Control Australia (目に見えぬ侵略 中国のオーストラリア支配計画; ISBN 978-4-86410-747-1) on 28 May 2020.

=== Korean translation ===
The Korean translation was published by Sejong Books as China's Quiet Invasion (중국의 조용한 침공; ISBN 978-89-8407-954-0) on 4 June 2021.

== Reception ==
The book received mixed reception in the Australian press, amid concerns that the book may promoting Sinophobia against Chinese Australians. Tim Soutphommasane, Australia's Race Discrimination Commissioner, argued that Hamilton's use of terms such as "panda huggers", "dyeing Australia red", and "China's fifth column in Australia" in the book promote Yellow Peril racism reminiscent of the White Australia policy and strokes anti-Chinese hysteria, which may lead to the loyalty of Chinese Australians being questioned and thus may limit their participation in Australia's multicultural society. In response, Hamilton rejected Soutphommasane's accusations of Sinophobia, by noting that the book was researched by Chinese-Australian researcher Alex Joske, endorsed by Sinologist John Fitzgerald and Chinese dissident groups, and argued that accusations of racism and Sinophobia take advantage of Australia's social anxieties over its past and play into the agenda of the Chinese Communist Party.

Due to controversy, Australian Greens MP David Shoebridge withdrew from the book's launch, and fellow Greens MP Justin Field attended the launch on his behalf.

In his review of the book, David Brophy, professor of Chinese history at the University of Sydney, questioned Hamilton's claims of Chinese interference, and argued that Hamilton promotes China as a threat "not because of what it does, but because of what it is", and that Hamilton overlooked domestic factors in his research. Brophy criticized Hamilton's call for the ban of Chinese civil organizations with links to Chinese embassies (such as Confucius Institutes), restrictions on visa applications from China supporters, as well as concerns over the loyalties of Chinese Australians, which Brophy compared to red-baiting during the Cold War, and argued would lead to increased ostracization against Chinese Australians and restrictions on their rights. Brophy also criticized Hamilton's accusations of Chinese threats to Australian intellectual freedom through the promotion of self-policing and political interference, and pointed out domestic factors such as the decrease in government funding of China research faculties, such the Australian National University's Asian studies courses, having a greater detrimental effect. Brophy concluded that Hamilton's arguments are "xenophobic" and "reflect an "unwillingness to confront our own failings and shift the blame onto China", and that while Hamilton raises some legitimate concerns such as foreign political interests interfering in Australia, they need to be approached through increased academic funding and transparency in political lobbying, rather than singling out a particular country.

== See also ==
- Hidden Hand
- 2019 Australian Parliament infiltration plot
