= Animal spirits (Keynes) =

Factors that influence human behaviour

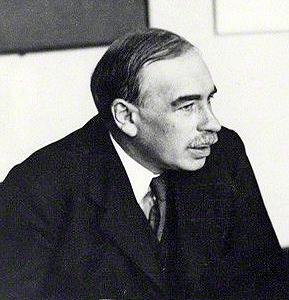
Keynes in 1933

Animal spirits is a term used by John Maynard Keynes in his 1936 book The General Theory of Employment, Interest and Money to describe the instincts, proclivities and emotions that seemingly influence human behavior, which can be measured in terms of consumer confidence. The concept has also been discussed in behavioral economics and social psychology, where it is used to explain how collective emotions and instincts can drive decision-making beyond rational calculation.

== Use by Keynes ==
The original passage by Keynes reads:

Even apart from the instability due to speculation, there is the instability due to the characteristic of human nature that a large proportion of our positive activities depend on spontaneous optimism rather than on a mathematical expectation, whether moral or hedonistic or economic. Most, probably, of our decisions to do something positive, the full consequences of which will be drawn out over many days to come, can only be taken as a result of animal spirits – of a spontaneous urge to action rather than inaction, and not as the outcome of a weighted average of quantitative benefits multiplied by quantitative probabilities.

== Earlier uses ==
=== Philosophy and social science ===
The notion of animal spirits has been described by René Descartes, Isaac Newton, and other scientists as how the notion of the vitality of the body is used.

In one of his letters about light, Newton wrote that animated spirits live in "the brain, nerves, and muscles, [which] may become a convenient vessel to hold so subtle a spirit." These spirits, as described by Newton, are animated spirits of an ethereal nature, relating to life in the body. Later, it became a concept that acquired a psychological content, but was always thought of in connection with the life processes of the body. Therefore, they retained a lower overall animal status.

William Safire explored the origins of the phrase in his 2009 article "On Language: 'Animal Spirits'":

The phrase that Keynes made famous in economics has a long history. "Physitions teache that there ben thre kindes of spirites", wrote Bartholomew Traheron in his 1543 translation of a text on surgery, "animal, vital, and natural. The animal spirite hath his seate in the brayne ... called animal, bycause it is the first instrument of the soule, which the Latins call animam." William Wood in 1719 was the first to apply it in economics: "The Increase of our Foreign Trade...whence has arisen all those Animal Spirits, those Springs of Riches which has enabled us to spend so many millions for the preservation of our Liberties." Hear, hear. Novelists seized its upbeat sense with enthusiasm. Daniel Defoe, in "Robinson Crusoe": "That the surprise may not drive the Animal Spirits from the Heart." Jane Austen used it to mean "ebullience" in "Pride and Prejudice": "She had high animal spirits." Benjamin Disraeli, a novelist in 1844, used it in that sense: "He...had great animal spirits, and a keen sense of enjoyment."

Thomas Hobbes used the phrase "animal spirits" to refer to passive emotions and instincts, as well as natural functions like breathing.

Ralph Waldo Emerson in Society and Solitude (1870) wrote of "animal spirits" as prompting people to action, in a broader sense than Keynes's:

A cold, sluggish blood thinks it has not facts enough to the purpose, and must decline its turn in the conversation. But they who speak have no more,—have less. 'T is not new facts that avail, but the heat to dissolve everybody's facts. Heat puts you in right relation with magazines of facts. The capital defect of cold, arid natures is the want of animal spirits. They seem a power incredible, as if God should raise the dead.

In social science, Karl Marx refers to "animal spirits" in the 1887 English translation of Capital, Volume 1. Marx speaks of the animal spirits of the workers, which he believes a capitalist can either impel by encouraging social interaction and competition within their factory or depress by adopting assembly-line work whereby the worker repeats a single task.

=== Earlier and contemporaneous English use ===
The authors P. G. Wodehouse and Arthur Conan Doyle were popular among public school boys in England before the Great War. Both used the phrase "animal spirits" in their writings.

Though a hard reader, he was no bookworm, but an active, powerful young fellow, full of animal spirits and vivacity, and extremely popular among his fellow-students.

— Doyle: The Silver Hatchet

There was, as a matter of fact, nothing much wrong with Stone and Robinson. They were just ordinary raggers of the type found at every public school, small and large. They were absolutely free from brain. They had a certain amount of muscle, and a vast store of animal spirits. They looked on school life purely as a vehicle for ragging.

— P.G. Wodehouse, Mike, Chapter 10

John Coates of Cambridge University describes the Edwardian public school environment as one where dynamism and leadership coexist with less constructive traits such as recklessness, heedlessness, and in-caution. Coates attributes this to fluctuations in hormonal balances; abnormally high levels of testosterone may create individual success but also collective excessive aggression, overconfidence, and herd behavior, while too much cortisol can promote irrational pessimism and risk aversion. The author's remedy for this is to shift the employment balance in finance towards women and older men and monitor traders' biology.

== Contemporary research ==
The term "animal spirits" was used in the works of a psychologist that Keynes had studied in 1905 and also suggests that Keynes implicitly drew upon an evolutionary understanding of human instinct.

In 2009, economists George Akerlof and Robert J. Shiller advised in addition that:

The proper role of the government, like the proper role of the advice-book parent, is to set the stage. The stage should give full rein to the creativity of capitalism. But it should also countervail the excesses that occur because of our animal spirits.

— Animal Spirits, page 9

Shiller further contends that "animal spirits" refers also to the sense of trust humans have in one another, including a sense of fairness in economic dealings.

== See also ==
- Behavioral economics
- Decision making
- Drive theory
