= Animal Spirits (book) =

Book by George Akerlof

Animal Spirits How Human Psychology Drives the Economy, and Why It Matters for Global Capitalism
- Front Cover
- Author: George Akerlof and Robert Shiller
- Language: English
- Subject: Economics
- Publisher: Princeton University Press
- Publication date: 2009
- Publication place: United States
- Media type: Print, e-book
- ISBN: 978-069114233-3
- OCLC: 276340712
- Dewey Decimal: 330.12/2019 22
- LC Class: HB74.P8 A494 2009

Animal Spirits: How Human Psychology Drives the Economy, and Why It Matters for Global Capitalism (2009) is a book by economists George Akerlof and Robert Shiller written to promote the understanding of the role played by emotions in influencing economic decision making. According to the authors, economists have tended to de-emphasize the importance of emotional factors, as the effects of emotions are difficult to model and quantify. The book asserts that a variety of otherwise puzzling questions can be answered once one allows for the effect that emotional drives, or "animal spirits," have on economic factors.

Akerlof and Shiller began writing the book in 2003. While finishing the work after the 2008 financial crisis, the authors set themselves the additional aim of promoting a much more aggressive US government intervention to alleviate the crises than has been seen as of February 2009. They repeatedly stress the need for decisive action targeted at restoring credit flows, and that the overall stimulus from the government needs to be much larger than would otherwise be the case due to very low levels of confidence about short and medium term economic prospects.

== Synopsis ==
The Preface recalls economist John Maynard Keynes's use of the phrase "animal spirits". Keynes (1883-1946) used "animal spirits" to describe the psychological forces that partly explain why the economy does not behave in the manner predicted by classical economics. Developed from the 1700s, classical economics proposed economic actors to behave as unemotional rational beings. The authors assert that the Keynesian Revolution of the mid-20th century was flawed as Keynes-influenced economists progressively disregarded the importance of animal spirits to accommodate the views of economists who preferred the simpler classical or neo-classical system.

The preface goes on to describe how Keynes' ideas suggest the economy will function best with a moderately high level of government intervention, which they compare to a happy home where children thrive with parents that are neither too authoritarian (as in a Marxist economy) nor too permissive (as in a neoliberal economy). The authors state that recent research now supports the concept of animal spirits much more robustly than Keynes was able to, and they express the hope that fellow economists can be convinced of this, thus reducing the internecine disputes that prevent their discipline from providing the clear support that politicians need for the aggressive action required to fix the 2008–2009 economic crises.

=== Part one ===
The five key animal spirits are treated here, each assigned their own chapter.

Chapter 1 the authors discuss confidence, which they say is the most important animal spirit to know about if one wishes to understand the economy.

Chapter 2 is about the desire for fairness, an emotional drive that can cause people to make decisions that aren't in their economic best interests.

Chapter 3 discusses corruption and bad faith, and how growing awareness of these practices can contribute to a recession, in addition to the direct harm the practices cause themselves.

Chapter 4 presents evidence that, in contrast to monetarist theory, many people are at least partially under the money illusion, the tendency for people to ignore the effects of inflation. Workers for example will forgo a pay rise even when prices are rising, if they know that their firm is facing challenging conditions—but they are much less willing to accept a pay cut even when prices are falling.

Chapter 5 is about the importance of stories in determining behaviour. Such as the repeatedly told story that house prices will always rise, which caused many additional people to invest in housing following the dot com bust of 2000.

=== Part two ===
Here the authors discuss eight important questions about the economy, which they assert can only be satisfactorily answered by a theory that takes animal spirits into account. Each question has its own chapter.

Chapter 6 is about why recessions happen. The authors assert that the business cycle can be explained by rising confidence in the upswing eventually leading investors to make rash decisions and ultimately encouraging corruption, until eventually panic appears and confidence evaporates, triggering a recession. There is a discussion about feedback loops between animal spirits and real returns available, which help explain the intensity of both the up and down swing of the cycle.

Chapter 7 discusses why animal spirits make central banks a necessity, and there is a post script about how they can intervene to help with the current crises.

Chapter 8 tackles the reasons for unemployment, which the authors say is partly due to animal spirits such as concerns for fairness and the money illusion.

Chapter 9 is about why there is a trade off between unemployment and inflation. The authors show how effects of animal spirits refutes the monetarist theory that there is a natural rate of employment which it is not desirable to exceed.

Chapter 10 is about why people don't consider the future rationally in their decisions about savings.

Chapter 11 presents an explanation for why asset prices and investment flows are so volatile.

Chapter 12 discusses why real estate markets go through cycles, with periods of often rapid price increase interspaced by falls.

Chapter 13 suggests that animal spirits can be used to explain the persistence of poverty among ethnic minorities, describing how working class minorities have different stories about how the world works and their place in it, compared to working class white people. The authors argue that the effects of animal spirits make a strong case for affirmative action.

Chapter 14 is a conclusion where the authors state that the cumulative evidence they have presented in the preceding chapters overwhelmingly shows that the neo classical view of the economy, which allows little or no role for animal spirits, is unreliable. They state that an effective response to the current economic crises must take into account the effects of animal spirits.

== Critical reception ==
Reviewing the book for the Financial Times, Clive Crook write "it is a fine book at exactly the right time.... Animal Spirits carries its ambition lightly—but is ambitious nonetheless. Economists will see it as a kind of manifesto." Andrew Rosenblum from The New York Observer says "Animal Spirits is most compelling when the authors summon all the key behavioral patterns to explain vast, complex phenomena such as the Great Depression.... Animal Spirits...is aimed squarely at the general reader, and rightly so: Macroeconomics is now everybody's business—the banks are playing with our money."

An exception to the numerous glowing reviews the book received was a lengthy critique published in The New Republic by the Judge Richard Posner. The authors responded to Posner's criticisms in an article published a few weeks later in the same periodical. And, on the same day and in the same periodical, Posner replied to the authors' response.

Animal Spirits was shortlisted for the 2009 Financial Times and Goldman Sachs Business Book of the Year Award.

The book has been translated into more than 20 languages including German, Chinese, Dutch, Persian, Greek, Italian, Spanish, and French.

== See also ==
- Behavioral economics
- Keynesian economics
- Growth Fetish
- 2008–2009 Keynesian resurgence
- Emotion
