= Silencing Dissent =

Book by Clive Hamilton and Sarah Maddison

Silencing Dissent: How the Australian government is controlling public opinion and stifling debate
- Author: Clive Hamilton, Sarah Maddison
- Language: English
- Publisher: Allen & Unwin Pty LTD
- Publication date: 2 January 2007
- Media type: Paperback
- Pages: 300 pages
- ISBN: 978-1-74175-101-7
- OCLC: 123377666
- Dewey Decimal: 323.440994 22
- LC Class: JC599.A8 S55 2007

Silencing Dissent: How the Australian Government is Controlling Public Opinion and Stifling Debate is a 2007 Australian book, edited by Clive Hamilton and Sarah Maddison.

The book's premise is that "the apparently unconnected phenomena of attacks on non-government organisations, the politicisation of the public service, the stacking of statutory authorities, increasing restrictions on academic freedom and control over universities, the gagging or manipulation of some sections of the media, and the politicisation of the military and intelligence services form a pattern that poses a grave threat to the state of democracy in Australia."

The book argues that during its decade in power, the Howard government in Australia "systematically dismantled democratic processes, stymied open and diverse debate and avoided making itself accountable to parliament or the community." According to one reviewer this "reflects not merely a government enforcing its particular version of democracy but amounts to a serious deterioration of Australia's democratic health."

== See also ==
- Growth Fetish
- Suppression of dissent
- Scorcher

== Bibliography ==
- Clive Hamilton and Sarah Maddison, eds. Foreword by Robert Manne. Silencing Dissent: How the Australian Government Is Controlling Public Opinion and Stifling Debate. Melbourne: Allen & Unwin, February 2007. Paperback: ISBN 1-74175-101-2, ISBN 978-1-74175-101-7.
