= Robin S. Rosenberg =

American author and clinical psychologist (born 1959)

Robin Sue Rosenberg
- Born: 1959 (age 66–67); New York City, New York, U.S.
- Education: New York University; University of Maryland, College Park
- Occupation: Clinical psychologist
- Writing career
- Subject: Psychology

Robin Sue Rosenberg (born 1959) is an American author and a clinical psychologist, certified by the American Board of Professional Psychology. She is best known for her research, writing and presentations about the psychology of superheroes and the psychology of cosplay. She is also the co-author of textbooks on psychology. She also treats people with eating disorders and anxiety disorders through clinical hypnosis, and is a personal coach.

== Early life and education ==
Rosenberg was born in New York City, and attended Hunter College High School. She received her B.A. in 1980 from New York University and her Ph.D. in clinical psychology in 1987 from the University of Maryland, College Park. She has taught at Lesley University and Harvard University.

== Career ==
Rosenberg has a clinical practice and a personal coaching practice in both San Francisco and Menlo Park, California. She is an adjunct clinical faculty member at the University of California, San Francisco; in 2013 she was president of the Santa Clara County Psychological Association and currently serves on the Ethics Committee of the California Psychological Association.

Rosenberg has also organized a number of events including panels at San Diego Comic-Con (e.g., "Is the Joker a Psychopath? You Decide!" with Joker co-creator Jerry Robinson, actor Adam West, and executive producer Michael Uslan), and she writes a blog for Psychology Today, Huffington Post, Psychablog, and for Heal Myself. She has also published various articles which explore the findings of scientific psychology through superheroes, including “Heroes on the Ball Field" in AOL News; and "The Hulk: Making a diagnosis" in the Boston Phoenix. She has also written more general articles about popular culture for the Financial Times and EverydayHealth.

Rosenberg and colleague Andrea Letamendi have done research on the psychology of cosplay, and have published articles about this in the journal Intensities and presented at the New York Comic Con in 2012 and Geek Girl Con in 2013.

Rosenberg also writes about mental illness and culture. Her articles on this general topic include “There’s No Defense for Affluenza” and “Abnormal is the New Normal” in Slate and “Why Will Half of the U.S. Population Have a Diagnosable Mental Disorder?” in Psychology Today.

== Research ==
Rosenberg's research includes work on the effects of virtual reality (with Jeremy Bailenson and the Virtual Human Interaction Lab at Stanford University), on the effects of an outdoor adventure program for young adult cancer survivors (with Whitney Lange, Bradley Zebrack and others), the psychology of the adoption of new technologies (with Christopher Ireland), as well as the psychology of cosplay (with Andrea Letamendi).

== Works ==
=== Popular culture ===
- Superhero Origins: What Makes Superheroes Tick and Why We Care (2013)
- What Is a Superhero (ed, with P. Coogan, 2013)
- What's the Matter with Batman? (2012)
- Psychology of Superheroes (ed., 2008)
- Psychology of the Girl with the Dragon Tattoo (2011, ed. with S. O'Neill)

=== Psychology textbooks ===
- Abnormal Psychology, 2e (2014)
- Introducing Psychology (2011)
- Abnormal Psychology (2010)
- Psychology in Context (2007)
- Fundamentals of Psychology in Context (2008)
- Psychology: The Brain, the Person, the World (2001, 2003)
- Fundamentals of Psychology: The Brain, the Person, the World (2002, 2004). (All of these texts were co-authored with S. M. Kosslyn.)

== See also ==
- Ethan Couch
