= Sarah Maddison =

Sarah Maddison CF is an Australian author and political scientist.

== Education ==
Maddison has a PhD in the Discipline of Government and International Relations at the University of Sydney.

== Career ==
She is a former director of GetUp! and the 2018–19 president of the Australian Political Studies Association. She was awarded a very large grant from the SEROS Foundation which was withdrawn under unclear circumstances.

Maddison has also co-authored two editions of a textbook for students of Australian public policy.

She has been an ARC Discovery Project grant recipient for three completed projects, one considering new possibilities for Indigenous representation (DP0877157), and another considering the evolution of social movements through a study of the Australian women’s movement (DP0878688 with Professor Marian Sawer, ANU), which produced the edited collection The Women's Movement in Protest, Institutions and the Internet: Australia in transnational perspective. The third project 2014, undertaken with colleagues in Melbourne and Canada, explored non-Indigenous attitudes to reconciliation with Indigenous peoples, through focus group research around the country.

In 2010 Maddison was awarded an Australian Research Council Future Fellowship to undertake a four-year, four-country comparative study of reconciliation and conflict transformation in Australia, South Africa, Northern Ireland and Guatemala. A book analysing the results from this research was published in 2015.

== Recognition ==
She was awarded the 2005 Jean Martin Award by The Australian Sociological Association for her PhD thesis, Collective identity and Australian Feminist Activism: conceptualising a third wave, which examined the role of young women in contemporary Australian women's movements.

In 2009 she was joint winner of the Australian Political Science Association Henry Mayer Award for her book Black Politics: Inside the complexity of Aboriginal political culture. In 2009 she was also part of the Sydney Leadership Program run by Social Leadership Australia at The Benevolent Society.

Maddison received a 2009 Churchill Fellowship to study models of Indigenous representation in the United States and Canada in 2010.

== Interests and current role ==
Maddison's research interests include Indigenous-settler relations, settler colonialism, reconciliation and conflict transformation, Indigenous politics, agonistic democracy, dialogue, and Australian social movements, including research on the Indigenous rights movement and the women’s movement.

She is Professor of Politics in the School of Social and Political Sciences at the University of Melbourne, where she also co-directs the Indigenous Settler Relations Collaboration.

== Publications ==
- Activist Wisdom: Practical Knowledge And Creative Tension in Social Movements, with Sean Scalmer. UNSW Press, 2005. ISBN 978-0-86840-686-2
- Silencing Dissent: How the Australian Government Is Controlling Public Opinion and Stifling Debate, edited with Clive Hamilton. Allen & Unwin, 2007. ISBN 978-1-74175-101-7
- Black Politics: Inside the Complexity of Aboriginal Political Culture. Allen & Unwin Australia, 2009. ISBN 978-1-74175-698-2
- An Introduction to Australian Public Policy, second edition, with Richard Denniss. Cambridge University Press, 2011. ISBN 9781107658257
- Unsettling the Settler State: Creativity and Resistance in Indigenous Settler-State Governance, edited with Morgan Brigg. Federation, 2011. ISBN 978-1-86287-826-6
- Beyond White Guilt: The real challenge for Black-White relations in Australia. Allen & Unwin, 2011. ISBN 978-1-74237-328-7
- The Women's Movement in Protest, Institutions and the Internet: Australia in transnational perspective, edited with Marian Sawer, Routledge, 2013. ISBN 978-0415830904*
- Conflict transformation and reconciliation: Multi-level challenges in deeply divided societies, Routledge, 2015 ISBN 978-113-80-7137-7
- The limits of settler-colonial reconciliation, edited with Tom Clark and Ravi de Costa, Springer, 2016. ISBN 978-981-10-2654-6
- The Colonial Fantasy: Why white Australia can't solve black problems, Allen & Unwin, 2019. ISBN 978-176-02-9582-0
