= Richard Denniss =

Australian economist

- Education: University of Sydney (PhD)
- Occupations: Author; economist; public policy commentator
- Organization: The Australia Institute

Richard Denniss is an Australian economist, author and public policy commentator. He is the co-Chief Executive Officer of The Australia Institute, an independent Australian public policy think tank. Denniss is known for his work on the relationships between economics, public policy, democratic institutions and the role of government in Australia.

== Career ==
Prior to his appointment at The Australia Institute, Denniss was senior strategic advisor to Australian Greens Leader Senator Bob Brown and was also chief of staff to Senator Natasha Stott Despoja, former Leader of the Australian Democrats. Denniss also worked as a researcher at the H.V. Evatt Memorial Foundation (the 'Evatt Foundation'), a public policy organisation with strong links to the Australian Labor Party. His academic work has resulted in publications in various peer-reviewed journals, and he has lectured in Economics at the University of Newcastle.

During the 2000s, Denniss' research focused on climate change policy and tax policy. He also worked on a number of projects aimed at improving the measurement of government and economic performance including the 'Genuine Progress Indicator' (GPI), the 'Wellbeing Manifesto', and the state of Australian Government.

666 ABC Canberra produced and broadcast "An occasional series with 'The Moral Economist'" podcast starring Richard Denniss, in 2013. The series discussed economic issues from the dollar cost of a human life to preventative health care to who deserves welfare.

In 2015, Denniss delivered the 16th Manning Clark Lecture at the Australian National University. The speech drew from Clark's writings, identifying 'enlargers' and 'punishers' in Australian cultural, economic and political history.

Australian Labor Party MP Andrew Leigh is quoted as saying, "I think of Richard as being kind of a mirror image of [free-market economist and former Reserve Bank board member] Warwick McKibbin."

== Publications ==
Denniss is the co-author (with Clive Hamilton) of best-selling book Affluenza: When Too Much is Never Enough and An introduction to Australian Public Policy (with Sarah Maddison). He co-authored Minority policy: rethinking governance when parliament matters with Brenton Prosser, a book that examines the operations of minority government and implications for public policy in Westminster systems. In 2016, his book Econobabble was published by Black Inc and Redback. Most recently, Denniss has published Curing Affluenza, a followup to Affluenza: When too Much is Never Enough, and is the author of the June 2018 Quarterly Essay, Dead Right: How Neoliberalism Ate Itself and What Comes Next.
