= Affluenza: The All-Consuming Epidemic =

2001 book by John de Graaf, David Wann and Thomas H. Naylor

- Author: John de Graaf, David Wann, and Thomas H. Naylor
- ISBN: 978-1-57675-199-2

Affluenza: The All-Consuming Epidemic is a 2001 anti-consumerist book by John de Graaf, environmental scientist David Wann, and economist Thomas H. Naylor. Viewing consumerism (with its accompanying overwork and dissatisfaction) as a deliberately spread disease, the book consists of three parts—symptoms, origins, and treatment. Affluenza is described as "a painful, contagious, socially transmitted condition of overload, debt, anxiety, and waste resulting from the dogged pursuit of more".

The book was considered one of the eight best non-fiction books of the year by Detroit Free Press, and copies were given to every freshman by two universities. The book was highly recommended for academic and public libraries by M. Bay from Indiana University in Library Journal. The Idaho State University has focused its Book Reading Project 2007 on the book.

== See also ==
- Affluenza
- Affluenza: When Too Much is Never Enough

== Translations ==
- French – J'achète!: combattre l'épidémie de surconsommation [Saint-Laurent]: Fides, 2004
- German – Affluenza. Zeitkrankheit Konsum. Random House: Omnibus Kinder und Jugend TB, München, 2002
- Russian – Потреблятство. Болезнь, угрожающая миру — Екатеринбург, Ультра.Культура, 2005
- Traditional Chinese - 告別富裕流感-21世紀新財富觀. 陳晉茂,黃玉華,鄭文琦譯.台北縣新店市:立緒文化, 2009
