= Hidden Hand: Exposing How the Chinese Communist Party Is Reshaping the World =

2020 non-fiction book by Clive Hamilton and Mareike Ohlberg

- Author: Clive Hamilton and Mareike Ohlberg
- Language: English
- Subject: Chinese Communist Party's influence operations, Australia–China relations
- Genre: Non-fiction
- Set in: Australia and the People's Republic of China
- Publisher: Hardie Grant (Australia), Optimum Publishing International (North America).
- Publication date: 4 May 2020
- Publication place: Australia
- Pages: 448
- ISBN: 9781743795576 (Paperback)
- OCLC: 1150166864
- Preceded by: Silent Invasion: China's influence in Australia
- Website: Hidden Hand: Exposing How the Chinese Communist Party Is Reshaping the World at the Internet Archive

Hidden Hand: Exposing How the Chinese Communist Party Is Reshaping the World is a 2020 book by Australians Clive Hamilton and Mareike Ohlberg, and is a follow-up of Hamilton's 2018 book Silent Invasion. The book details the claim of "the Chinese Communist Party's global program of influence and subversion, and the threat it poses to democracy".

The book details what the authors describe as "the nature and extent of the Chinese Communist Party's influence operations across the Western world – in politics, business, universities, think tanks and international institutions such as the UN. This new authoritarian power is using democracy to undermine democracy in pursuit of its global ambitions".

Andrew Podger wrote in his book review in The Conversation that while it was extremely detailed, it was not a balanced and scholarly document. He said that while Hamilton and Ohlberg wanted to respond to Chinese influence by rejecting liberal economics and strengthening democratic politics, what was needed was actually a combination of both.

== Translations ==
The Japanese translation was published by Asuka Shinsha Publishing as Invisible Hand: How Is the Chinese Communist Party Reshaping the World? (見えない手 中国共産党は世界をどう作り変えるか; ISBN 9784864108010) on 25 December 2020.

== Legal challenge ==
In June 2020, the 48 Group Club and its chairman Stephen Perry launched a libel lawsuit in a failed attempt to block the book's publication in Canada, the United Kingdom, and the United States.
