= Breakthrough – National Centre for Climate Restoration =

Australian climate change organisation

Breakthrough
- National Centre for Climate Restoration
- Website type: Climate change
- Available in: English
- Website: www.breakthroughonline.org.au
- Launched: November 8, 2017; 8 years ago
- Current status: Active

The Breakthrough – National Centre for Climate Restoration is an independent think-tank established in 2014, located in Melbourne, Australia. Their website describes Breakthrough's mission as the development and promotion of strategies, innovation and analysis which are required to restore the climate to a safe condition.

== General ==
In 2014, the Melbourne Sustainable Society Institute, part of the Melbourne University provided its campus for the Breakthrough: National Climate Restoration Forum. In 2017, Breakthrough hosted a public event at the University of Melbourne and at the Australian National University, featuring the film The Age of Consequences which focuses on the security impacts of climate change. Guest speaker Sherri W. Goodman, former US Deputy Undersecretary of Defense for Environmental Security, and a key contributor to a series of landmark US reports on climate security, provided an overview of the key points from the documentary.

The same year the Australian Broadcasting Corporation aired a podcast on the topic of climate risks, highlighting a report from Breakthrough. The report stated that "global warming will drive increasingly severe humanitarian crises, forced migration, political instability and conflict in the Asia-Pacific and world."

In 2018, Breakthrough made a submission to the Foreign Affairs, Defence and Trade Committee of the Australian Senate which was conducting an Inquiry Into Threats And Long-Term Risks Posed By Climate Change To National Security And International Security. Breakthrough's submission to the committee said "Post-Paris emissions pathways are consistent with 3°C or more of warming, with the potential for a 4–5°C temperature increase. The global risks include dramatic changes to agricultural patterns, water systems and food security, and coastal inundation and forced migrations, which have the capacity to destabilise nations, fuel multi- national conflict and increase the risk of nuclear war."

David Spratt, Research Director for Breakthrough said there was a disconnect between evidence presented to the inquiry, that climate change was a "current and existential national security risk", and the recommendations that emerged from it.

=== Directors ===
Luke Taylor is Managing Director of the Breakthrough Centre. David Spratt, author of Climate Code Red, is the research director. Giselle Wilkinson is the Outreach Director. Ian Dunlop, former chair of the Australian Coal Association and CEO of the Australian Institute of Company Directors is a senior member of the advisory board of Breakthrough.

== Reports ==
2017: In 2017 the report Disaster Alley was released, warning of a refugee crisis across the Asia-Pacific, due to global warming. In 2018, Breakthrough published the report What Lies Beneath: The Understatement of Existential Climate Risk, with a scope on climate policy and climate actions, authored by David Spratt and Ian Dunlop, and a foreword by Hans Joachim Schellnhuber. David Wallace-Wells from the New York Magazine described the report as terrifying. Alvin Stone from the Australian Research Council, notes about the report, "This report is not intended as a “science paper”, rather its designed to translate science into action and highlight risks..".

2018: In June 2018, Breakthrough released a new report titled Existential climate-related security risk: A scenario approach describing a climate change doomsday scenario by 2050 if we don't act soon. The report says the plans that countries put forward in Paris in 2016 to cut emissions will still lead to around 3°C of warming. Breakthrough says warming will actually be much higher because the number does not include long-term carbon cycle feedback loops. It predicts that by 2050, sea levels will have risen by 0.5 metres, the Amazon ecosystem will collapse, the Arctic will be ice-free in summer, global crop yields drop by a fifth and more than half of the world’s population faces 20 days a year of lethal heat.

The report says "irreversible damage" is happening to global climate systems "resulting in a world of chaos where political panic is the norm and we are on a path facing the end of civilisation". Adam Sobel, professor of applied physics and mathematics at Columbia University in New York who studies atmospheric and climate dynamics, says the scenarios described in the report "don't seem that far-fetched to me." Mark Maslin of University College, London, said the report adds to concerns expressed by security experts at the Pentagon over climate change.

2019: In May 2019, Breakthrough released a new discussion paper titled The Third Degree: Evidence and implications for Australia of existential climate-related security risk providing evidence to support a scenario for 3 °C of global warming and warning that Australia is totally unprepared for current and escalating climate impacts and that the 'Official Future' subscribed to by most political and corporate leaders remains one of "climate denial and predatory delay".

== Documentary ==
In May 2019, Breakthrough in association with Scout Films released Episode One of the four-part documentary Home Front, produced and directed by Luke Taylor. Episode One, titled Existential Gamble, runs for 16:30 minutes and features interviews with significant people from the military, business and humanitarian communities including former Liberal Party leader John Hewson, World Vision chief Tim Costello and former Australian Airforce Deputy Chief John Blackburn. They describe the potential security and infrastructure threats from rapid climate change including political instability, economic collapse, mass migration and sea-level rise.

== Awards ==
Breakthrough received The 2015 Community Environment Recognition Award from Environment Victoria. They were commended for challenging those involved in addressing climate change to appreciate that the situation is now an emergency and that those involved in campaigning should act accordingly.

== See also ==
- Environmental security
