= Anderson School (Bozeman, Montana) =

- U.S. National Register of Historic Places
- Location within Montana Location within the United States
- Location: East of Gallatin Gateway, Montana
- Coordinates: 45°35′53″N 111°06′14″W
- Area: less than one acre
- Built: 1916
- Architectural style: Bungalow/craftsman
- MPS: One Room Schoolhouses of Gallatin County TR
- NRHP reference No.: 81000354
- Added to NRHP: July 21, 1981

The Anderson School near Gallatin Gateway, Montana was built in 1916. It was listed on the National Register of Historic Places in 1981.

It is a square, hipped roof, one-story frame schoolhouse with clapboard siding, on a concrete foundation. It has elements of bungalow style and its design "very closely resembles plan C-3 from W.R. Plew's bulletin on school house design published in 1919."

A long frame stable to the west of the building is a second contributing building in the listing.
