= Wanda Urbanska =

American author and television host

- Born: South Bend, Indiana, U.S.
- Occupations: author and television host, and a media, public relations and political strategist
- Known for: Leading the Jan Karski US Centennial Campaign and Jan Karski Educational Foundation

Wanda Urbanska is an author and television host, and a media, public relations, and political strategist. She formerly directed the Jan Karski US Centennial Campaign and served as founding President of the Jan Karski Educational Foundation. On May 29, 2012, the Campaign was successful in obtaining a Presidential Medal of Freedom for Polish Underground hero of World War II, Jan Karski.

The author or coauthor of nine books, including The Heart of Simple Living: 7 Paths to a Better Life (Krause: 2010), Urbanska was host-producer of America's first nationally syndicated public TV series advocating sustainable living, Simple Living with Wanda Urbanska. (The series ran on public television for four seasons from 2004 through 2008 and is now available on Amazon Prime.) She is published widely in the Los Angeles Times, the Washington Post, the Chicago Tribune, Natural Home, Mother Earth News, and many others, and was a monthly blogger for the American Library Association's “@ your library website.”

A graduate of Harvard University and a frequent visitor to Poland, her father's native land, Urbanska was awarded the prestigious Amicus Poloniae award in 2006 for promoting good will between America and Poland.

== Biography ==
Wanda Marie Urbanski was born in South Bend, Indiana, when her father, Edmund Stephen Urbanski, was a visiting professor at Notre Dame. The family, which included her mother, Marie Olesen Urbanski, moved frequently during her childhood. She began writing professionally while still in high school for the Bangor Daily News in Maine and interned on-camera on Maine Public Television's live program, Maine News and Comment, during her senior year. While at Harvard, Urbanska interned at Newsweek magazine and was named one of Glamour magazine's Top Ten College Women in 1977. She traveled to Poland the summer of her junior year in college, and upon graduation, adopted the Polish feminine of her name professionally. In 2009 – 2010, Urbanska took a seven-month sabbatical to Poland, with her then 12-year-old son, staying with a widowed friend in a townhouse in suburban Warsaw.

=== Professional life ===
Urbanska began her career in New York, working for The Paris Review as an associate editor. She later moved to Los Angeles where she joined the staff of the Los Angeles Herald Examiner as an assistant editor of its in-house Sunday magazine and later as a business reporter, covering retail, airlines, and health care. She moved to Southwest Virginia in 1986 with her husband, Frank Levering, to take over his family's orchard business and wrote books in collaboration with him about the benefits of simple and rural living. Their book, Simple Living: One Couple's Search for a Better Life was published by Viking in 1992. It was followed by Moving to a Small Town: A Guidebook for Moving from Urban to Rural America (1996). Urbanska co-authored Christmas on Jane Street: Based on a True Story with Billy Romp (1998). She co-authored Nothing's Too Small to Make a Difference with Levering, which was published in 2004.

She produced and hosted Simple Living with Wanda Urbanska for four seasons, which appeared on PBS stations nationally. The series advocates sustainable living based on the four multiple and overlapping principles of environmental stewardship; thoughtful consumption; community involvement; and financial responsibility.

=== Personal life ===
Urbanska married Frank Levering in 1983 in Castine, Maine. They had one child, Henry Levering, in 1997. Their marriage ended in divorce. Henry Levering died in May 2025 from complications of Type 1 diabetes. On October 12, 2025, she married the author and businessman David Chaffetz.

== Bibliography ==
- Builders of Hope: A Social Entrepreneur's Solution for Rebuilding America (2011) ISBN 978-0-89587-568-6
- The Heart of Simple Living: 7 Paths to a Better Life (2010) ISBN 978-1-4402-0451-7
- Less is More: Embracing simplicity for a healthy planet, a caring economy and lasting happiness (2009) ISBN 978-0-86571-650-6
- The Singular Generation: Young Americans in the 1980s., Doubleday, 1986, ISBN 0385192649, 245pp.
