= Climate Code Red =

2008 book by David Spratt and Philip Sutton

Climate Code Red: The Case for Emergency Action
- Author: David Spratt, Philip Sutton
- Subject: Climate change
- Publisher: Scribe Publications
- Publication date: 2008
- Publication place: Australia
- Pages: 304 pp
- ISBN: 1-921372-20-6
- OCLC: 243605472

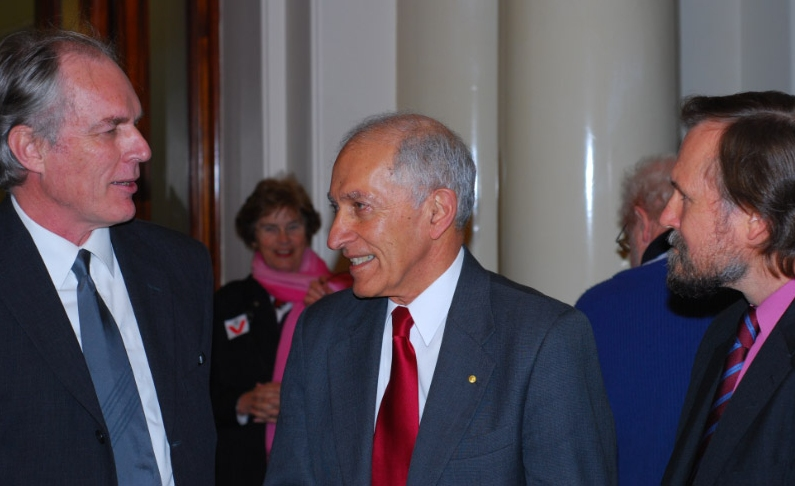
David Spratt, Governor David de Kretser and Philip Sutton at the book launch for Climate Code Red

Climate Code Red: The Case for Emergency Action is a 2008 book which presents scientific evidence that the global warming crisis is worse than official reports and national governments have so far indicated. The book argues humanity is facing a sustainability emergency that requires a clear break from business-as-usual politics. The authors explain that emergency action to address climate change is not so much a radical idea as an indispensable course to embark upon. It draws heavily on the work of many climate scientists, including James E. Hansen.

== General ==
The key themes of Climate Code Red are:

- "Our goal is a safe-climate future – we have no right to bargain away species or human lives."
- "We are facing rapid warming impacts: the danger is immediate, not just in the future."
- "For a safe climate future, we must take action now to stop emissions and to cool the earth."
- "Plan a large-scale transition to a post-carbon economy and society."
- "Recognise a climate and sustainability emergency, because we need to move at a pace far beyond business and politics as usual".

Co-author David Spratt is a Melbourne businessman, climate-policy analyst, and co-founder of the Carbon Equity network, and Research Director of the Breakthrough - National Centre for Climate Restoration. Co-author Philip Sutton is convener of the Greenleap Strategic Institute and Assistant Convenor of the Climate Emergency Network.

The book was launched by the Governor of Victoria, Professor David de Kretser in Parliament House in Melbourne, Victoria, on July 17, 2008.

== See also ==
- List of Australian environmental books
- Requiem for a Species
- Greenhouse Solutions with Sustainable Energy
