= Reaction Time (book) =

2007 book by Ian Lowe

- Author: Ian Lowe
- Publisher: Quarterly Essay (Black Inc)
- Publication date: 2007
- Pages: 129 pp.
- ISBN: 978-1-86395-412-9
- OCLC: 174110394

Reaction Time: Climate Change and the Nuclear Option is a 2007 book by Professor Ian Lowe The book is about energy policy.

== Themes ==
In his book he says: "the nuclear option does not make sense on any level: economically, environmentally, politically or socially. It is too costly, too dangerous, too slow and has too small an impact on global warming."

== Quote ==
"Promoting nuclear power as the solution to climate change is like advocating smoking as a cure for obesity. That is, taking up the nuclear option will make it much more difficult to move to the sort of sustainable, ecologically healthy future that should be our goal."

== See also ==
- Anti-nuclear movement in Australia
- List of books about nuclear issues
- Renewable energy commercialization
- List of Australian environmental books
- Quarterly Essay
