= The Freedom Paradox =

2008 book by Clive Hamilton

- Author: Clive Hamilton
- Language: English
- Publisher: Allen & Unwin
- Publication date: 2008
- ISBN: 9781741755077

The Freedom Paradox: Towards a Post-Secular Ethics (Allen & Unwin, 274pp) is a 2008 book by Professor Clive Hamilton. This is a philosophical book related to the nature and consequences of advanced consumer capitalism. In the book Hamilton proposes a system of "post-secular ethics" that will serve as a challenge to the "moral malaise" occasioned by the "freedom of the marketplace". The book consists of five parts:

- "In the first of these parts, Hamilton systematically works through the paradox of "unfreedom" to reveal the pathological structures ... that have subverted the promise of freedom heralded by the several revolutions of the twentieth century, of which economic liberalism is the most recent and enduring".
- "In part two, Hamilton provides the metaphysical basis for his analysis - and for his resolution. The moral life has its basis in a conformity - a creative and vibrant conformity - with Schopenhauer's noumenon, a "metaphysical absolute" or "universal essence"." The noumenon was an origincal idea by Immanuel Kant and refers to the thing in itself.
- "In the final three parts, Hamilton anneals his ethics in the forge of his metaphysics, and provides several practical applications (to suicide, sex, non-human life, aesthetics, sociality, happiness)."

The Freedom Paradox was launched in Canberra by Justice Michael Kirby on 5 August 2008.

== Quotes ==
- "Freed from want, discrimination and oppression, we huddle together like sheep seeking one another's comfort after the fences have been taken down, habituated to the domesticated life and fearful of what lies beyond". (p. 218)
- "Depression characterises contemporary consumer society". (p. 223)
