= World War Zero =

Climate activism organization

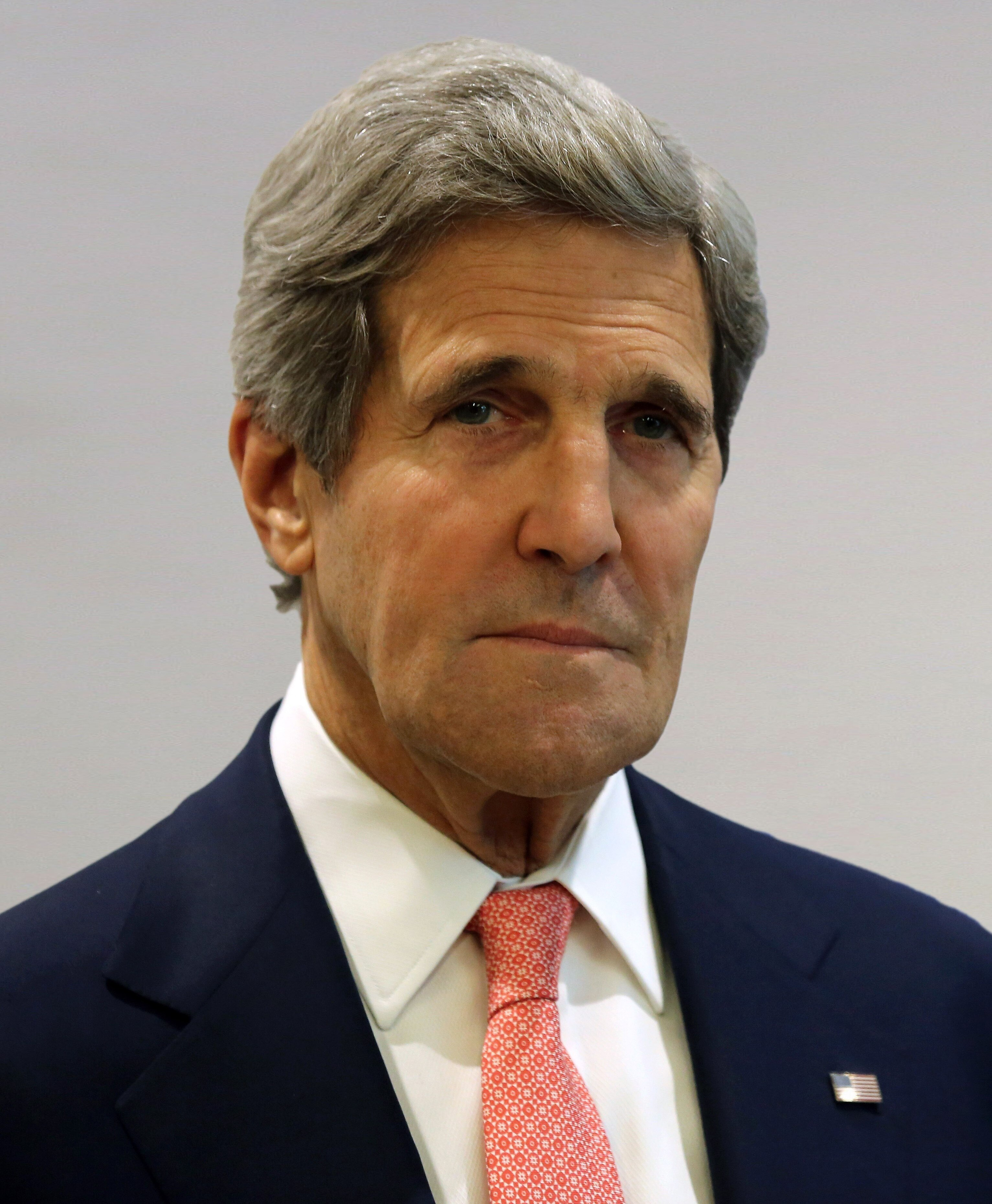
Former U.S. Special Presidential Envoy for Climate John Kerry.

World War Zero is an American coalition launched by John Kerry in 2019 to fight the climate crisis. The main goal of the coalition is to hold more than ten million “climate conversations” in 2020 with citizens across the political spectrum.

== Background ==
According to scientists assembled by the United Nations, global carbon emissions must be halved by 2030 and eliminated entirely by 2050 in order to restrict global warming to comparatively safe levels for humanity.

John Kerry, former US presidential candidate and former US Secretary of State, launched the coalition in late 2019. Members of the organization include politicians, military leaders, and celebrities.

== Goals ==
The aim of the coalition is to address climate change and find ways to prevent the destruction of human habitats. It plans to achieve this by mobilizing the public in America and around the world in order to raise awareness for the issue. Kerry stated that a rapid mobilization is needed to halt the increase in carbon emissions worldwide immediately.

The name of the coalition–World War Zero–refers to the danger to national security presented by global warming. When Chuck Todd asked John Kerry during his Sunday morning appearance on NBC’s Meet The Press, whether the real issue was getting United States President Donald Trump to act on climate, Kerry replied:

Well it’s not just the president, Chuck. There are great efforts out there, many environmental groups, young people, particularly, but no country is getting the job done. [...] And so we have our unlikely allies coming together here. There’s no group that has people as diverse as ours in terms of nationality, age, gender, ideology, background, life experience and all of these people have come together saying, we’ve got to treat this like a war.

== List of participants ==
Among the 60 founders of the coalition were:

- Madeleine Albright, former US secretary of State
- Gordon Brown, former prime minister of the United Kingdom
- Jimmy Carter, former US president
- Bill Clinton, former US president
- Leonardo DiCaprio, actor and environmental activist
- Katie Eder, activist and social entrepreneur
- John Kasich, former governor of Ohio
- John Kerry, former US senator and former US secretary of State
- Ashton Kutcher, actor and producer
- Cindy McCain, businesswoman, philanthropist, and humanitarian
- Stanley A. McChrystal, retired United States Army general
- Shay Mitchell, actress, model, entrepreneur and author
- Ernest Moniz, nuclear physicist and former US secretary of Energy
- Hank Paulson, former US secretary of the Treasury
- Susan Rice, former US National Security Advisor and US Ambassador to the United Nations
- Arnold Schwarzenegger, former governor of California
- Al Sharpton, civil rights activist, Baptist minister, talk show host and politician
- Jaden Smith, rapper, singer, songwriter
- Olympia Snowe, businesswoman and politician, former United States Senator from Maine
- Sting, singer
- Emma Watson, actress, model and activist
- Meg Whitman, business executive, political activist, and philanthropist
