= Ian Lowe =

Australian academic and writer focused on environmental issues

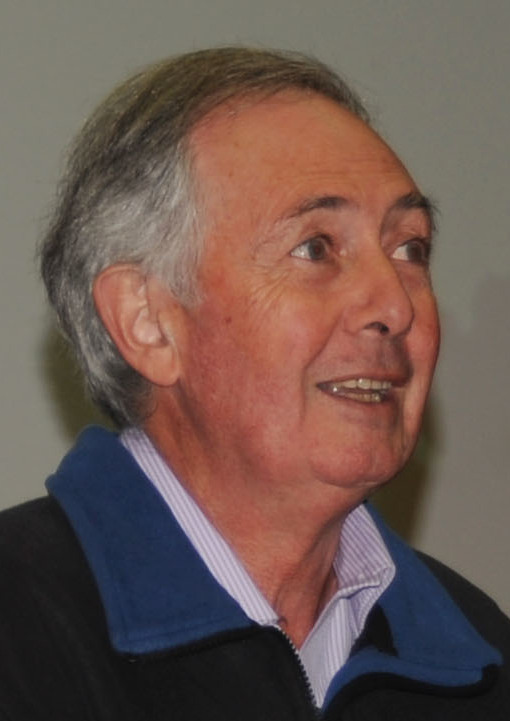
Ian Lowe in 2009

Ian Lowe AO (born 3 November 1942) is an Australian academic and writer focused on environmental issues. A physics graduate, he is an Emeritus Professor of Science, Technology and Society and former Head of the School of Science at Griffith University. He is also an adjunct professor at Sunshine Coast University and Flinders University.

Lowe has authored or co-authored 10 books, 10 Open University books, more than 50 book chapters and over 500 other publications. Books by Lowe include A Big Fix, Reaction Time, Living in the Hothouse, Why vs Why: Nuclear Power, A Voice of Reason: Reflections on Australia, Bigger or Better? Australia's Population Debate, The Lucky Country? Reinventing Australia and Long Half-life: The Nuclear Industry in Australia.

== Career ==
In 1996, Lowe was chair-person of the advisory council producing the first national report on the state of Australia's environment. He is a patron of Sustainable Population Australia. One of his principal interests is the way policy decisions influence use of science and technology, especially in the fields of energy and environment.

He wrote for 13 years a regular column for New Scientist and also writes for several other publications, as well as contributing frequently to electronic media programs.

Lowe was a member of the Australian Radiation Health and Safety Advisory Council from 2002 to 2014 and a former member or chair of many other bodies advising all three levels of government in Australia.

He was President of the Australian Conservation Foundation from 2004 to 2014.

In April 2015 Lowe was appointed to the Expert Advisory Committee for the Nuclear Fuel Cycle Royal Commission in South Australia.

He is currently Emeritus Professor of Science, Technology and Society and former Head of the School of Science at Griffith University. He is also an adjunct professor at Sunshine Coast University and Flinders University.

== Energy advocacy ==
Lowe sees the nuclear power option for electricity generation as being risky and unworkable. He says nuclear power installations peaked last century and in the past 20 years, retirements, cancellations and deferments have outnumbered new reactor construction. Lowe says nuclear power is too expensive, with insurmountable problems associated with waste disposal and weapons proliferation. It is also not a fast enough response to address climate change. Lowe advocates for renewable energy which he claims is "quicker, less expensive and less dangerous than nuclear".

== Awards ==
Lowe was made an Officer of the Order of Australia in 2001 for services to science, technology, and the environment. In 2002 he was awarded a Centenary Medal for contributions to environmental science and won the Eureka Prize for promotion of science. His contributions have also been recognised by the Prime Minister's Environment Award for Outstanding Individual Achievement, the Queensland Premier's Millennium Award for Excellence in Science and the University of NSW Alumni Award for achievement in science. Lowe was named Humanist of the Year in 1988. He was President of the Australian Conservation Foundation from 2004 to April 2014. In 2009 the International Academy of Sciences, Health and Ecology awarded him the Konrad Lorenz Gold Medal. In 2019, the University of New South Wales recognised his body of published work by the award of a higher doctorate, Doctor of Science [D.Sc.].

== Bibliography ==
=== Books ===
- Lowe, Ian (2008). A big fix : radical solutions for Australia's environmental crisis. Melbourne: Black, Inc.
- Reaction time
- Living in the Hothouse
- Why vs Why: Nuclear Power
- A Voice of Reason: Reflections on Australia
- Bigger or Better? Australia's Population Debate
- The Lucky Country? Reinventing Australia
- Lowe, Ian (2021). Long Half-life: The Nuclear Industry in Australia. Melbourne: Monash University Publishing.

=== Articles and other contributions ===
- Lowe, Ian (March 2003). "Groundswell". Correspondence. Quarterly Essay. 9: 97–102.

== See also ==
- Anti-nuclear movement in Australia
