= A Big Fix =

2005 book by Ian Lowe

- Book cover, first edition
- Author: Ian Lowe
- Language: English
- Publisher: Black Inc.
- Publication date: 2005
- ISBN: 978-1863951265

A Big Fix: Radical Solutions for Australia's Environmental Crisis is a 2005 book by Ian Lowe which argues that the warnings from environmental scientists are urgent and unequivocal. Lowe suggests that resources are being used too quickly, environmental systems are being compromised, and society is being destabilised by the increasing gap between rich and poor. Lowe proposes several radical solutions. He advocates a fundamental change to our personal values and social institutions and provides a vision of a healthier society – one that is more humane, takes an eco-centric approach, adopts longer-term thinking, and respects natural systems.

== See also ==
- List of Australian environmental books
