= Clive Hamilton =

Australian academic

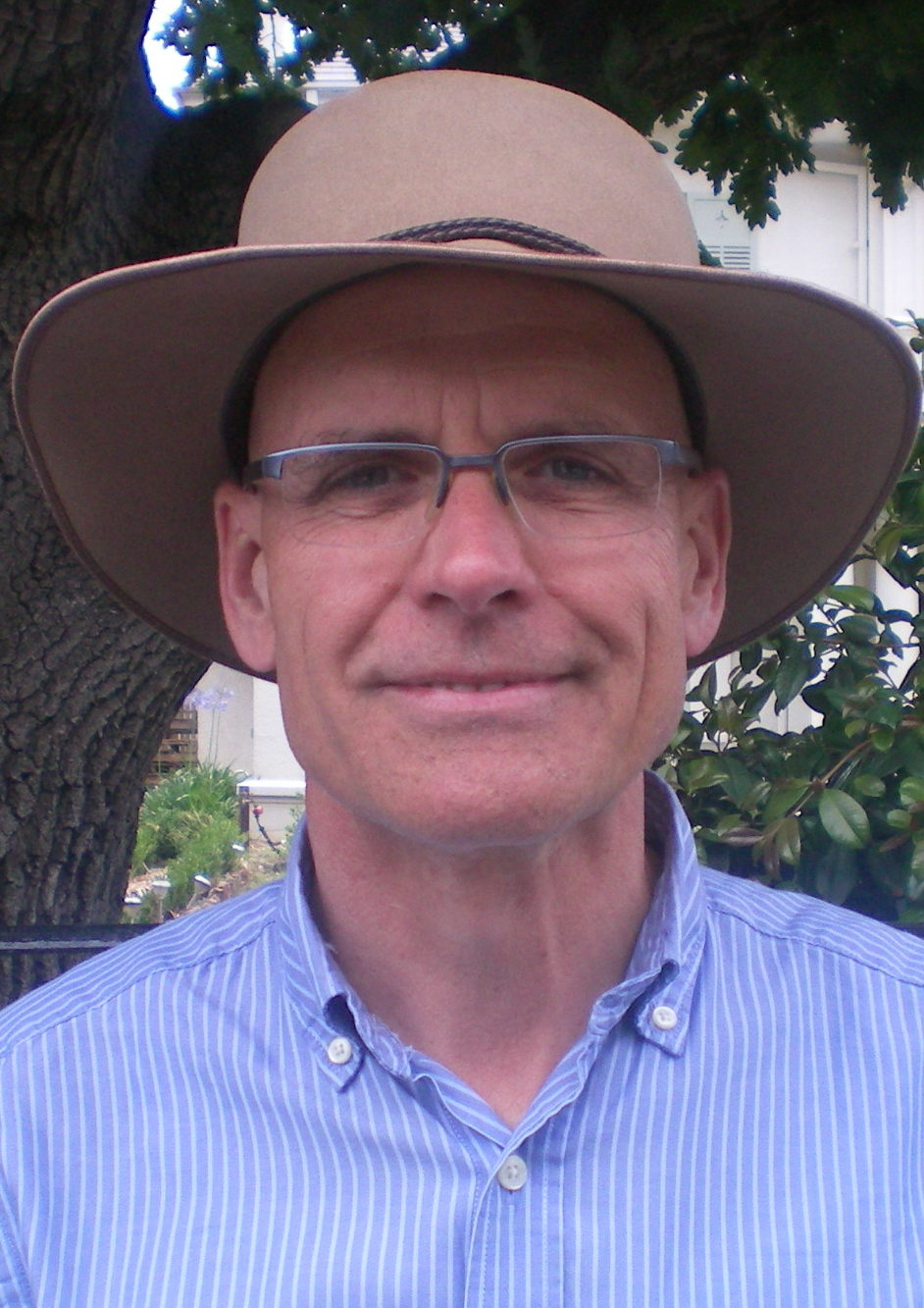
- Clive Hamilton, in 2009.
- Born: 12 March 1953 (age 73)
- Awards: Order of Australia

Education
- Education: Australian National University, University of Sussex

Philosophical work
- Institutions: Australian National University, Charles Sturt University
- Notable works: Growth Fetish, Afluenza & Silent Invasion (book)
- Website: CliveHamilton.com

Clive Charles Hamilton AM FRSA (born 12 March 1953) is an Australian public intellectual currently serving as Professor of Public Ethics at the Centre for Applied Philosophy and Public Ethics (CAPPE) and the Vice-Chancellor's Chair in Public Ethics at Charles Sturt University. He is a member of the board of the Climate Change Authority of the Australian Government, and is the founder and former executive director of The Australia Institute. He regularly appears in the Australian media and contributes to public policy debates. Hamilton was granted the award of Member of the Order of Australia on 8 June 2009 for "service to public debate and policy development, particularly in the fields of climate change, sustainability and societal trends".

== Education and academic career ==
Hamilton graduated from the Australian National University with a Bachelor of Arts in history, psychology and pure mathematics in 1975 and completed a Bachelor of Economics with First Class Honours from the University of Sydney in 1979. He was an Overseas Commonwealth Postgraduate Scholar and completed his Doctorate at the Institute of Development Studies at the University of Sussex in 1984. His thesis was titled "A general equilibrium model of South Korean development".

He was a postdoctoral fellow and research fellow at the Research School of Pacific Studies of the Australian National University from 1984 to 1988 and the director of the Graduate Program in the Economics of the Development at the National Centre for Development Studies of the Australian National University from 1986 to 1988. From 1994 to 1997 he was a senior lecturer in public policy and from 1997 to 2002 he was a fellow in public policy at the Australian National University and he was a Visiting Fellow of the National Centre for Epidemiology and Population Health in 2004.

From 1988 to 1990 he was a senior research economist at the Bureau of Industry Economics of the Federal Department of Industry, Science and Resources (now the Productivity Commission).

Hamilton founded the Australia Institute in 1993 and was executive director until 2008.

He has been an academic visitor at the Oxford Uehiro Centre for Practical Ethics, a visiting lecturer at the Oxford Martin School and a visiting professor at the Faculty of Philosophy of the University of Oxford.

He is a Life Member of Clare Hall, University of Cambridge and was a visiting scholar of the Department of Land Economy of the University of Cambridge.

He was a senior visiting fellow of the School of Forestry and Environmental Studies of Yale University.

== Works ==
Hamilton has written about the issue of climate change politics over a period of some 15 years. His book Requiem for a Species (Earthscan 2010) explores climate change denial and its implications. His earlier books, Scorcher (2007) and Running from the Storm (2001), were critical of the Australian Government's efforts, especially in relation to the Kyoto Protocol. Hamilton's general view about climate change is that the "world is on a path to a very unpleasant future and it is too late to stop it". Hamilton argues that to believe anything else is to deny the climate change truth and engage in wishful thinking.

Hamilton has written several books relating to consumerism and overconsumption. Growth Fetish (2003) became an Australian best-seller and suggests that the unthinking pursuit of economic growth has become a fetish, which has not led to any real improvements in levels of happiness. In Growth Fetish, Hamilton advocates the politics of wellbeing over economic growth. In Affluenza (2005), Hamilton describes how these themes play out at a personal level, as he explores the shallowness of modern consumer life. In What's Left? (2006) Hamilton comments on topics written about in Growth Fetish and Affluenza. He argues that there is an emergence of new types of "alienation and exploitation", in the form of ravages of the free market, which have "robbed life of its meaning". The Freedom Paradox (2008) relates to the nature and consequences of advanced consumer capitalism. In the book Hamilton proposes a system of "post-secular ethics" that will serve as a challenge to the "moral malaise" occasioned by the "freedom of the marketplace".

Silencing Dissent: How the Australian Government is Controlling Public Opinion and Stifling Debate, edited with Sarah Maddison was published in 2007.

In February 2018 Hamilton published the book Silent Invasion: China's influence in Australia on the increasing involvement of the Chinese Communist Party in Australian civil society and politics.

In June 2020, British businessman and advocate of closer China-UK economic relations Stephen Perry and the 48 Group Club launched a defamation lawsuit in a failed attempt to block the release of Hamilton's Hidden Hand: Exposing How the Chinese Communist Party Is Reshaping the World.

== Political candidate ==
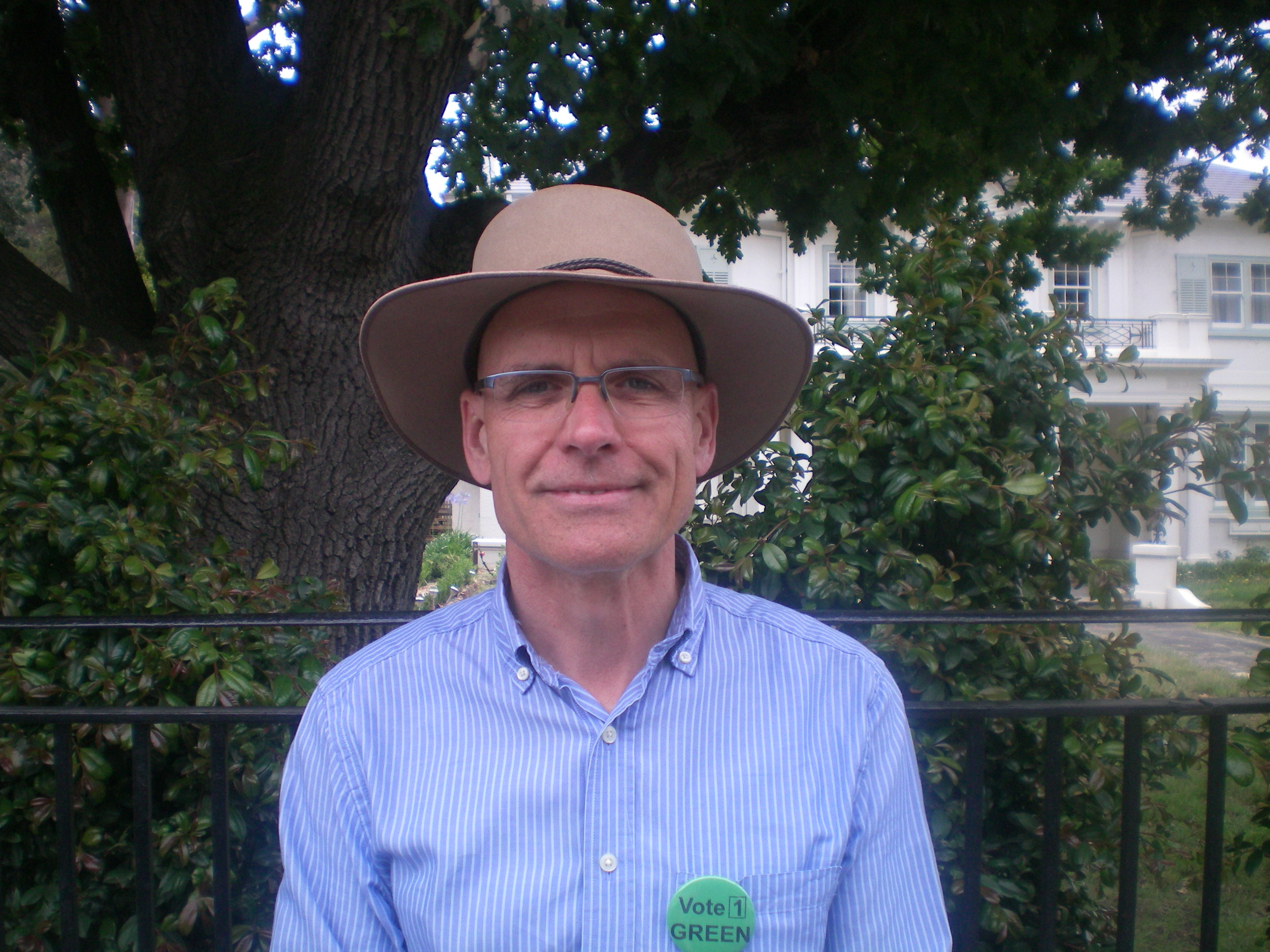
Hamilton campaigning in the seat of Higgins in 2009

On 23 October 2009, Hamilton was announced as the Australian Greens candidate for the by-election in the federal seat of Higgins. He ran against nine others for the seat, and came second, receiving 32.40 percent of primary votes and 39.77 percent of preferred votes. The Australian Labor Party did not run a candidate in the election.

== Bibliography ==
Books by Clive Hamilton include:

- Hamilton, Clive (1986). Capitalist Industrialization in Korea, Westview Press.
- Hamilton, Clive (ed) (1991). The Economic Dynamics of Australian Industry, North Sydney: Allen & Unwin.
- Hamilton, Clive (1994). The Mystic Economist, Sydney: Willow Park Press.
- Hamilton, Clive & Diesendorf, Mark (eds) (1997). Human Ecology, Human Economy: Ideas for an Ecologically Sustainable Future, Sydney: Allen & Unwin.
- Hamilton, Clive & Throsby, David (eds) (1998). The ESD Process: Evaluating a Policy Experiment, Canberra: Academy of Social Sciences in Australia.
- Hamilton, Clive (2001). Running from the Storm: The Development of Climate Change Policy in Australia, Sydney: University of New South Wales Press.
- Hamilton, Clive (2003). Growth Fetish, Sydney: Allen & Unwin.
- Hamilton, Clive & Denniss, Richard (2005). Affluenza: When Too Much is Never Enough, Sydney: Allen & Unwin.
- Hamilton, Clive (2006). What's Left? The Death of Social Democracy, Sydney: Quarterly Essay.
- Hamilton, Clive (2007). Scorcher: The Dirty Politics of Climate Change, Melbourne: Black Inc.
- Hamilton, Clive & Maddison, Sarah (eds) (2007). Silencing Dissent: How the Australian Government Is Controlling Public Opinion and Stifling Debate, Sydney: Allen & Unwin.
- Hamilton, Clive (2008). The Freedom Paradox: Towards a Post-Secular Ethics, Sydney: Allen & Unwin.
- Hamilton, Clive (2010). Requiem for a Species: Why We Resist The Truth About Climate Change, Sydney: Allen & Unwin.
- Hamilton, Clive (2013). Earthmasters: Playing God with the climate, Sydney: Allen & Unwin.
- Hamilton, Clive (2016). What Do We Want?: The Story of Protest in Australia, Canberra: National Library of Australia
- Hamilton, Clive (2017). Defiant Earth: The Fate of Humans in the Anthropocene, Sydney: Allen & Unwin.
- Hamilton, Clive (2018). Silent Invasion: China's influence in Australia, Sydney: Hardie Grant Books. ISBN 9781743794807.
- Hamilton, Clive & Ohlberg, Mareike (2020). Hidden Hand: Exposing How the Chinese Communist Party Is Reshaping the World, Sydney: Hardie Grant Books. ISBN 9781743795576.
- Hamilton, Clive (2018). Provocateur: A Life of Ideas in Action, Hardie Grant Books. ISBN 9781743798577.
- Hamilton, Clive & Wilkenfeld, George (2024). Living Hot: Surviving and Thriving on a Heating Planet, Hardie Grant Books. ISBN 9781761450594
- Hamilton, Clive (2026). Negotiating the End of the World: Kant, Schmitt, and the Global Climate Struggle, Polity. ISBN 9781509572755

== See also ==
- Ecological economics
- Ethics
- Ian Lowe
- Mark Diesendorf
- Social policy
