= The Australia Institute =

Australian think tank

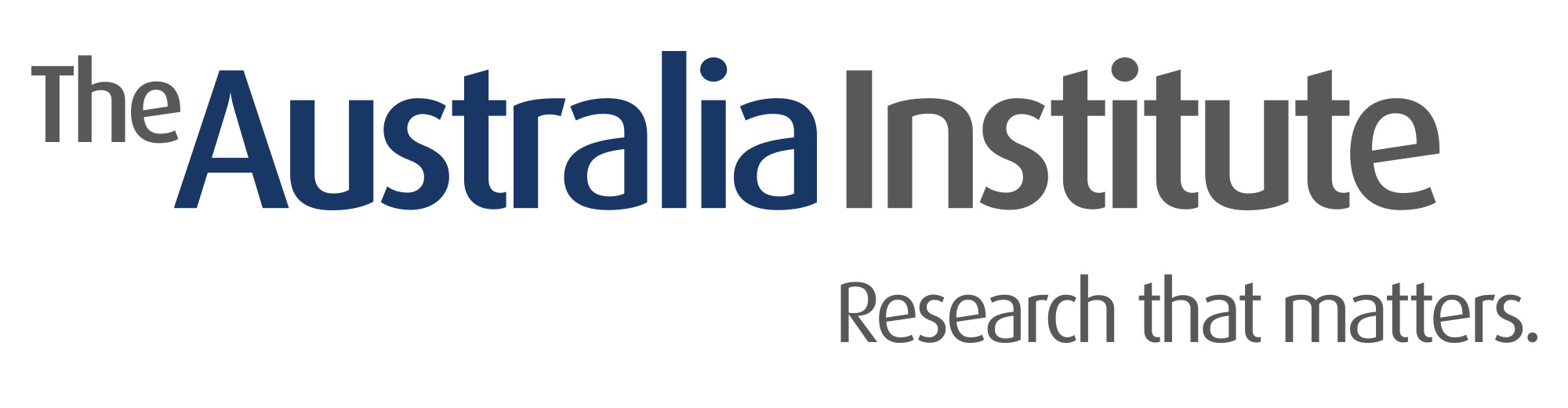
- Formation: 4 May 1994; 32 years ago
- Type: Public policy think tank
- Legal status: Charity
- Director: Richard Denniss
- Revenue: $10.82 million (2025)
- Expenses: $11.6 million (2025)
- Website: www.australiainstitute.org.au

The Australia Institute is an Australian public policy think tank based in Canberra. Since its launch in 1994, it has carried out research on a broad range of economic, social, and environmental issues. The Australia Institute states that it takes a bipartisan approach to research, but it has been described as "progressive" or "left-leaning".

The Australia Institute has faced criticism over alleged links with the Australian Greens, with critics arguing these connections undermine its claim of being non-partisan. Media reporting has highlighted that several current and former senior figures at the Institute have held roles with the Greens, including founder and former executive director Clive Hamilton, who ran as a Greens candidate in 2009, former executive director Ben Oquist and current executive director Richard Denniss, both of whom previously worked in the office of former Greens leader Bob Brown, and other staff who have served as advisers or communications officials for the party. Former deputy chair Barbara Pocock resigned from the Institute before entering the Australian Senate as a Greens senator in 2022. Critics, including some within the Australian Labor Party, have pointed to policy alignment between the Institute and the Greens on issues such as tax, climate, energy and defence as further evidence of political affinity. The Australia Institute has rejected these claims, stating it has no formal political affiliations and arguing that its independence is demonstrated by its willingness to criticise or support policies from any political party based on its research.

== Research ==
The Australia Institute undertakes economic analysis with special emphasis on the role of the public sector as well as issues such as taxation and inequality, including gender inequality, poverty, privatisation, foreign investment, and corporate power. Some of The Australia Institute's contributions involve analysis of modelling exercises on the part of other groups such as assessing some of the pandemic modelling as well as the modelling behind the government's intergenerational report. The fiscal response has prompted attention to the tax base and so The Australia Institute described the principles of a good tax and a report on how to make the budget less sexist. These are some of the topics among the hundreds of reports on economic issues generally.

The Australia Institute has produced research in the climate and energy space since 1994. In 2017, The Australia Institute took over the work of the Climate Institute, including continuing the Climate of the Nation report, the longest continuous survey of community attitudes to climate change in Australia. The Australia Institute also published the National Energy Emissions Audit until October 2021.

The Australia Institute's Democracy & Accountability Program was established to "research the solutions to our democratic deficit and develop the political strategies to put them into practice". Issues pursued by the program include truth in political advertising laws, how state and federal governments have handled the COVID-19 pandemic, and freedom of information laws.

In October 2019, The Australia Institute established the International and Security Affairs Program to examine "the global connectivity that both underpins and impacts on Australia’s place in the world and the well-being of our citizens". The program addresses a broad range of contemporary global issues, including new thinking on what security means, a contemporary Middle East policy, the proper use of the defence force, the ANZUS Treaty, Australia's relations with China, and how Australia might improve its performance in the Pacific.

The Australia Institute's researchers are prominent commentators on public policy issues, including work on climate change and energy, emissions trading, taxation policy, and inequality.

== History ==
Clive Hamilton helped establish The Australia Institute in 1994 to generate public debate on building a better society, particularly the environment. It was formally established on 4 May 1994. The first directors of the institute were Professor Max Neutze (inaugural chair); Hugh Saddler, a consultant in energy policy; and John Langmore; then a Labor Party MP; John Neville; Russell Rollason, then executive director of the Australian Council for Overseas Aid; Elizabeth Reid, the former first women's adviser to the prime minister Gough Whitlam in 1973; Barbara Spalding, an expert in social welfare and education; and Professor Marion Simms, an expert in the fields of gender studies and political science.

Hamilton was the executive director until his resignation in 2008. He was succeeded in the role by Richard Denniss, who stepped down in 2015 to take up the role of chief economist.

Ben Oquist was executive director from 2015 to 2022. He was succeeded by Richard Denniss, who returned to the role in 2022. In October 2025, the board announced an executive leadership restructure in which Leanne Minshull was appointed co-Chief Executive Officer alongside Richard Denniss, who continues in the co-CEO role.

== Description and standpoints ==
The Australia Institute claims to take a bipartisan approach to research but has been described as a "progressive" or "left-leaning" think-tank.

=== Climate change and energy ===
The Australia Institute is active in promoting global warming mitigation measures and has been critical of the Australian federal government's perceived lack of action on climate change. The Australia Institute was critical of the Howard government's decision to refuse to ratify the Kyoto Protocol and claims that the former Prime Minister and some senior ministers deny the scientific evidence for global warming and that the resources sector drives government energy policy. Leaked minutes of a meeting between the Energy Minister, the Prime Minister and fossil fuel lobbyists provide evidence for those claims.

The Australia Institute has been active in promoting renewable energy development and other mitigation measures and has campaigned strongly against developing a nuclear industry in Australia.

The Australia Institute criticised the Rudd government's proposed Australian emissions trading scheme (or Carbon Pollution Reduction Scheme) by arguing that it failed to adequately take into account voluntary action and delivered excessive compensation to polluting industries.

The Australia Institute viewed positively the design of the carbon price mechanism implemented by the Gillard government and argued that beginning with a fixed price and transitioning to an emissions trading scheme made sense since there was no consensus about what the emissions reduction target should be.

In 2014, Ben Oquist, who was the Australia Institute's strategy director, was involved in the Palmer United Party's decision to vote against the abolition of the Renewable Energy Target, the Clean Energy Finance Corporation, and the Climate Change Authority. Oquist wrote, "The Australia Institute is disappointed that the carbon price is likely to be repealed". However, "The Palmer-Gore announcement has re-set climate policy and politics. Keeping the CCA, the RET and the CEFC is much more than most expected from the PUP. We have avoided a big step backwards".

In 2017, The Australia Institute reported that Australia's greenhouse gas emissions had been "rising rapidly" since the abolition of the carbon price, with the economist Matt Grudnoff criticising the National Energy Guarantee proposed by the Turnbull government by saying that it would be "likely to cause our emissions to rise even faster".

In 2017, The Australia Institute took over The Climate Institute's intellectual property after that institute's closure, and it subsequently launched a Climate and Energy Program to continue that work. The first Climate of the Nation report produced by The Australia Institute was released in 2018.

=== Tax reform ===
The Australia Institute employs several economists, who have published papers arguing for tax reform, particularly in the areas of superannuation tax concessions, negative gearing, capital gains tax, and goods and services tax.

During the 2016 Australian federal election, The Australia Institute published a series of critiques of the Coalition's proposed policy of cutting the company tax rate.

The Australia Institute criticised the final two stages of the Turnbull government's three-stage income tax cut plan and released research into how the benefits from the tax cut are distributed more heavily to those with incomes, and wealthy Liberal electorates.

== Funding and resourcing ==
The Australia Institute is a registered not-for-profit organisation under the Australian Charities and Not-for-profits Commission. It had a total gross income of A$10.8 million in 2025 (A$10.04M in 2024, and $9.05M in 2023) and is funded by donations from philanthropic trusts and individuals, as well as grants and commissioned research from business, unions, and non-government organisations. The Australia Institute reported 42 full-time equivalent staff.

In its first decade to 2003, The Australia Institute was largely funded by the Poola Foundation and the Treepot Foundation, philanthropic organisations run by the Kantors. Other significant funders include the McKinnon Family Foundation; David Morawetz's Social Justice Fund, a sub-fund of the Australian Communities Foundation; the US Rockefeller Foundation, Diana and Brian Snape, and the Susan McKinnon Foundation. In 2025, it was reported that the Minderoo Foundation, a philanthropic charity established by mining magnate Andrew Forrest, made an undisclosed donation to the Australia Institute. The contribution, described by media sources as "substantial", drew attention due to Minderoo’s policy alignment with the Institute on issues such as emissions reduction and climate policy.

In recent years, The Australia Institute has reported the number of donations that it has received from individuals, with 2,000 individual donors in financial year 2015 and 2,700 in the financial year 2017.

The Australia Institute does not disclose its sources of funding but claims that it does not accept donations or commissioned work from political parties.

== See also ==
- List of Australian think tanks
- Heinrich Böll Foundation
- Verdant (think tank)
