= Growth Fetish =

Book by Clive Hamilton

- First edition
- Author: Clive Hamilton
- Language: English
- Subject: Economics, politics
- Publisher: Allen & Unwin
- Publication date: 2003
- Publication place: Australia
- Pages: 262
- ISBN: 1-74114-078-1
- OCLC: 223516822

Growth Fetish is a book about economics and politics by the Australian progressive political theorist Clive Hamilton. Published in 2003 it became a best-seller in Australia.

The book argues that the policies of unfettered capitalism pursued by the west for the last 50 years has largely failed, since the underlying purpose of the creation of wealth is happiness, and Hamilton claims that people in general are no happier now than 50 years ago, despite the huge increase in personal wealth. Hamilton goes on to claim that the pursuit of growth has become a fetish, pursued at a tremendous cost in terms of the environment, erosion of democracy, and the values of society as a whole.

== Background ==
Clive Hamilton is the former executive director of The Australia Institute, an independent think-tank which has been cited as playing a significant role in debate over social and environmental policies. Hamilton resigned from the Australia Institute in 2007. Growth Fetish itself reflects many of the findings from TAI's report Overconsumption in Australia, which found that 62 per cent of Australians believe they cannot afford everything they need, even though in real terms their incomes have never been higher.

== Synopsis ==
Hamilton's catchphrase "People buy things they don't need, with money they don't have, to impress people they don't like"—an axiom "borrowed" from actor Walter Slezak—sums up his philosophy on consumerism.

Hamilton proposes that where a society has developed to the point at which the majority of people live reasonably comfortably, the pursuit of growth is pointless and should be curtailed. The surplus wealth could then be diverted into the essential infrastructure and to other nations that have not reached this level of wealth. Hamilton adapted the term Eudemonism to denote a political and economic model that does not depend on ever increasing and ultimately unsustainable levels of growth, but instead (page 212) "promotes the full realisation of human potential through ... proper appreciation of the sources of wellbeing", among which he identifies social relationships, job satisfaction, religious belief for some, and above all a sense of meaning and purpose.

Hamilton relates the fetish for growth to a "development mentality", and to a neoliberal "instrumental value theory [which] maintains that, while humans are valuable in and of themselves, the non-human world is valuable only insofar as it contributes to the well-being of humans" (page 191). To this he contrasts the stance of the "transpersonal ecology" described by Warwick Fox: this is "centred on the notion that only the ego-involved, contracted self can imagine itself to be distinct from the natural world and that expansion of the self beyond the boundaries of the personal necessarily means that one's awareness, and ground of concern, extends to the natural world" (page 194).

== See also ==
- Animal Spirits: How Human Psychology Drives the Economy, and Why It Matters for Global Capitalism
