= Affluenza: When Too Much is Never Enough =

2005 book by Clive Hamilton and Richard Denniss

- Author: Clive Hamilton, Richard Denniss
- Language: English
- Publisher: Allen & Unwin
- Publication date: 2005
- Publication place: Australia
- Pages: 224
- ISBN: 1-74114-671-2
- OCLC: 60762940

Affluenza: When Too Much is Never Enough is a book written by Professor Clive Hamilton and Richard Denniss, and was published in 2005. According to the book, Western society is addicted to overconsumption and this situation is unique in human history. Hamilton and Denniss argue that overconsumption is driven by aspiration, in an effort to emulate the lifestyles of the rich and the famous through the identities and fulfilments that commodities are supposed to, but do not necessarily, deliver. Rates of stress, depression and obesity are high as people try to cope with the emptiness and disappointments of consumer life.

Affluenza says that an increasing number of Australians are ignoring advertisers, reducing their spending, and reprioritizing their time.

In 2017, Richard Denniss published a follow-up book called Curing Affluenza.

== See also ==
- Affluenza
- Consumerism
