= Affluenza =

Socio-psychological effects of consumerism

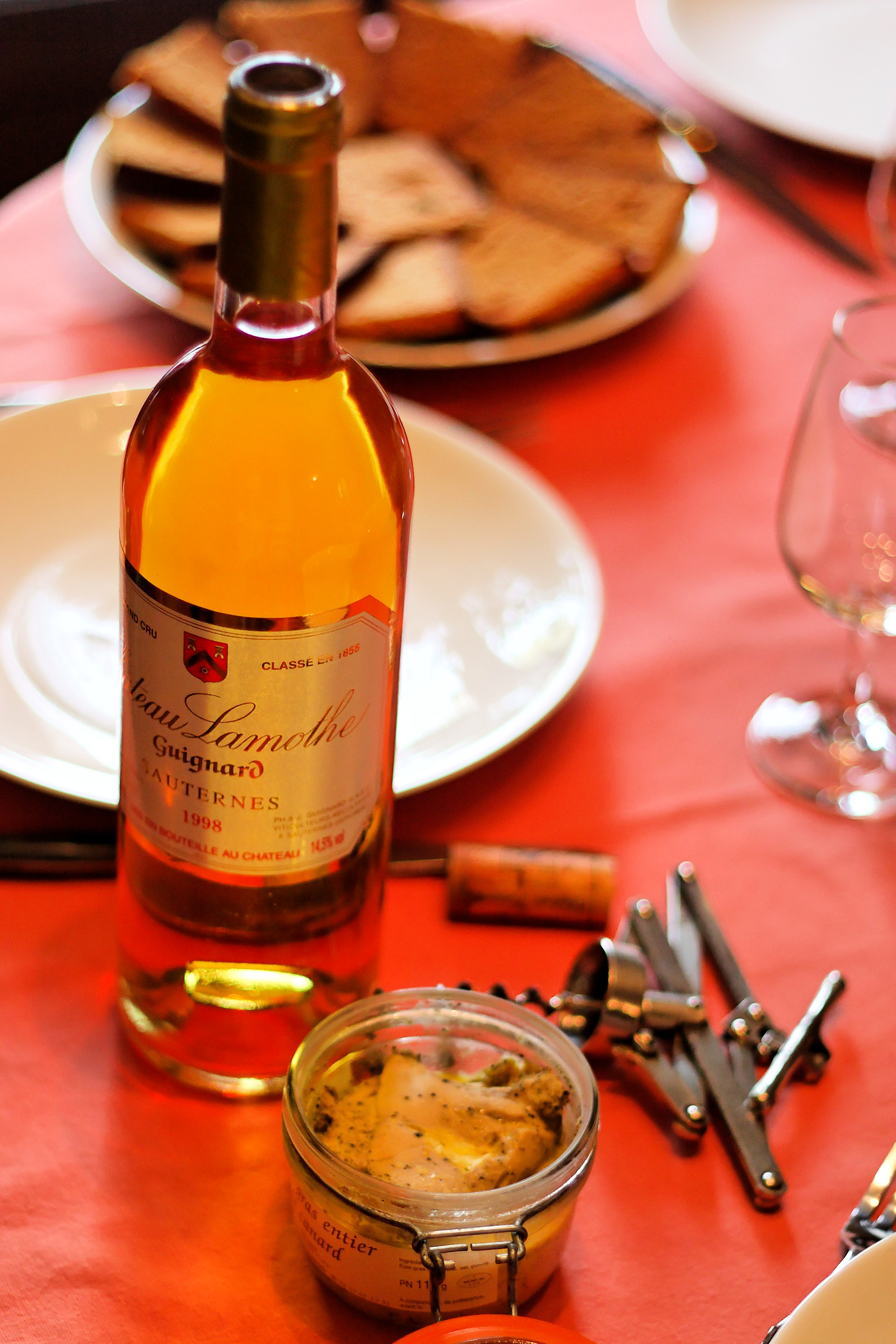
Wine and foie gras are examples of luxury goods.

Affluenza describes the psychological and social effects of affluence. It is a portmanteau of affluence and influenza, and is used most commonly by critics of consumerism. Some psychologists consider it to be a pseudo-scientific term; however, the word continues to be used in scientific literature.

== History ==
The word is thought to have been first used in 1908, and to have been adopted for its most common current usage in California in 1973. It was also used by John Levy, executive director of the C.G. Jung Institute in San Francisco in 1984 to describe the lack of motivation that could dog wealthy people. It was popularized in 1997 with a PBS documentary of the same name and the subsequent book Affluenza: The All-Consuming Epidemic (2001, revised in 2005, 2014). These works define affluenza as "a painful, contagious, socially transmitted condition of overload, debt, anxiety, and waste resulting from the dogged pursuit of more". A more informal definition of the term describes it as "a quasi-illness caused by guilt for one's own socio-economic superiority". The term "affluenza" has also been used to refer to an inability to understand the consequences of one's actions because of financial privilege, as described in discussions of the psychological effects of inherited wealth.

The term "affluenza" was re-popularized in 2013 with the arrest of Ethan Couch, a wealthy Texas teen, for driving while intoxicated and killing four pedestrians and injuring several others. Testimony from a psychologist in court referred to Couch as having a case of affluenza, sparking a media frenzy and victim family outrage. The psychologist testified during the sentencing phase as a part of mitigation of penalty, not, as was reported, as a defence to the charge at trial. The term has been further popularized by the case of Ontario billionaire Marco Muzzo, who, like Couch, was arrested for driving while intoxicated, causing a vehicular collision that killed three children and their grandfather in 2015.

== Theory ==
Clive Hamilton and Richard Denniss's 2005 book, Affluenza: When Too Much is Never Enough, poses the question: "If the economy has been doing so well, why are we not becoming happier?" They argue that affluenza causes overconsumption, "luxury fever", consumer debt, overwork, waste, and harm to the environment. These pressures lead to "psychological disorders, alienation and distress", causing people to "self-medicate with mood-altering drugs and excessive alcohol consumption".

They note that a number of Australians have reacted by "downshifting"—they decided to "reduce their incomes and place family, friends and contentment above money in determining their life goals". Their critique leads them to identify the need for an "alternative political philosophy", and the book concludes with a "political manifesto for wellbeing".

In 2007 British pop psychologist Oliver James asserted that there was a correlation between the increasing occurrence of affluenza and the resulting increase in material inequality: the more unequal a society, the greater the unhappiness of its citizens. Referring to Vance Packard's thesis The Hidden Persuaders on the manipulative methods used by the advertising industry, James related the stimulation of artificial needs to the rise in affluenza. To highlight the spread of affluenza in societies with varied levels of inequality, James interviewed people in several cities including Sydney, Singapore, Auckland, Moscow, Shanghai, Copenhagen and New York.

In 2008 James wrote that higher rates of mental disorders were the consequence of excessive wealth-seeking in consumerist nations. In a graph created from multiple data sources, James plotted "Prevalence of any emotional distress" and "Income inequality", attempting to show that English-speaking nations have nearly twice as much emotional distress as mainland Europe and Japan: 21.6 percent vs 11.5 percent. James defined affluenza as "placing a high value on money, possessions, appearances (physical and social) and fame", which was the rationale behind the increasing mental illness in English-speaking societies. He explained the greater incidence of affluenza as the result of 'selfish capitalism', the market liberal political governance found in English-speaking nations as compared to the less selfish capitalism pursued in mainland Europe. James asserted that societies can remove the negative consumerist effects by pursuing real needs over perceived wants, and by defining themselves as having value independent of their material possessions.

== See also ==
- Affluenza (film)
- Diseases of affluence – Health conditions thought to be a result of increasing wealth in society
- Escape from Affluenza
- Lifestyle disease – Diseases linked with the way people live their life
- People v. Turner – 2015 American criminal case
