= George Waldbott =

George L. Waldbott (January 14, 1898 – July 17, 1982), was an American physician, scientist, and leading activist against water fluoridation.

== Background ==
Waldbott, the son of Leo Waldbott and Hermine Rosenberger, was born in 1898 in Speyer, Germany. Both his parents were Jewish. Waldbott studied medicine in Heidelberg and graduated as a Dr. med. from the Medical School of the University of Heidelberg in 1921. Afterwards he emigrated to the United States, where he interned at the Henry Ford Hospital in Detroit. He specialized in the research and treatment of allergies. In this field he published several books and more than 200 scientific articles, many in American Medical Association journals. His Health Effects of Environmental Pollutants (2nd edition, March 1978) was used as a textbook in universities in the United States and abroad. Waldbott was a pioneer in the study of allergies, and the founder and chief of allergy clinics in four Detroit hospitals. He was president of the Michigan Branch of the American College of Chest Physicians, Chairman of the Air Pollution Committee and of the American Academy of Allergy.

Waldbott is noted for his fundamental research on human anaphylaxis and penicillin shock, allergy-induced respiratory problems, and later in his career, the health impact of air pollutants. Waldbott was one of the first to recognize the connection between allergies and what was then known as "thymic death." His multiple publications in medical journals educated his generation of physicians about the causes and symptoms of anaphylactic shock.

In 1953, Waldbott was the first to recognize and describe a new disease he called "Smoker's Respiratory Syndrome." This was the first association between tobacco smoking and chronic respiratory disease. Up until that point, the condition was known as idiopathic asthma.

In the mid Fifties, Waldbott began conducting research in fluoride toxicity, becoming one of the first physicians to warn against what he believed was adverse health effects of water fluoridation, particularly among patients in his allergy practice he considered "hypersensitive" to fluoride. He conducted double blind studies and published his findings. One of his many awards was from the journal Cutis in March 1972 for his manuscript co-authored with Dr. V. A. Cecilioni on Chizzola Maculae, describing the skin lesion as a diagnostic tool for the identification of chronic fluoride poisoning. A founder of the International Society for Fluoride Research, he was considered one of the key figures in the anti-fluoridation movement for over two decades.

A book review of Waldbott's book Fluoridation: The Great Dilemma in the journal New Scientist closes with this statement "Laymen, including those concerned with decisions on fluoridation, will be impressed by what seems to be the reasonableness of the case, oblivious to the omissions and obsolete presuppositions upon which much of it is based." In addition to medical texts and scientific publications, Waldbott published his personal experience of professional vilification due to his fluoride opposition in A Struggle with Titans, an experience shared by many other fluoridation opponents.

== Books ==
- Waldbott, GL: Contact Dermatitis. Springfield, Ill.: Thomas, 1953
- Waldbott, GL, Exner, FB, Rorty, J (ed.): The American Fluoridation Experiment. Devin-Adair, NY, 1957
- Waldbott, GL: A Struggle With Titans: Forces Behind Fluoridation. Carlton Press, New York, 1965
- Waldbott, GL: Health Effects of Environmental Pollutants. Mosby, St Louis, 1973
- Waldbott, GL, Burgstahler AW, McKinney HL.: Fluoridation: The Great Dilemma. Coronado Press, Lawrence, Kansas, 1978

== See also ==
- Philip RN Sutton
- Mark Diesendorf
- Brian Martin (social scientist)
- Theron Randolph
- Arthur C. Ford
