= IEI =

IEI may mean:

- Idiopathic environmental intolerance, also known as multiple chemical sensitivity
- Inborn errors of immunity, genetic mutations that cause an increased susceptibility to disease
- Intensive English Institute, at the University of Illinois Urbana-Champaign
- Institut d'échanges interculturels
- Institute for Emerging Issues
- Institution of Engineers (India)
- Institution of Engineers of Ireland
- Intuitive Ethical Introvert, in socionics theory
- Iran Electronics Industries
