= Richard Mackarness =

British physician

- Born: 17 August 1916; Murree, India
- Died: 18 March 1996 (aged 79); Mornington, Australia
- Occupations: Physician, writer

Guy Richard Godfrey Mackarness (17 August 1916 – 18 March 1996) was a British psychiatrist and low-carbohydrate diet writer. He is best known for his book Eat Fat and Grow Slim, published in 1958. Mackarness was an early advocate of the Paleolithic diet and authored books on food allergies.

== Biography ==
Mackarness was born in Murree, India. He received his education from Lancing College and the Westminster Teaching Hospital. He later left general practice to become an assistant psychiatrist at Park Prewett Hospital, Basingstoke (1965–1981). Mackarness was an advocate of clinical ecology and was influenced by the research of Theron Randolph on food allergies. He developed a controversial environmental approach to psychiatric disease. His ideas were not accepted by the medical community.

Mackarness met Theron Randolph in the 1950s and applied his methods to treat patients with mental illness at Basingstoke Hospital. In 1979, Mackarness was described as "Britain's foremost champion of clinical ecology." He believed that most patients with psychiatric problems can trace their symptoms to an allergy. He treated patients at Basingstoke Hospital for food and chemical allergies mostly on an outpatient basis.

Mackarness was a founding member of the Clinical Ecology Group, which later became the British Society for Allergy and Environmental Medicine. He also founded the Chemical Victims Association. Mackarness stated he was allergic to eggs and coffee so removed them from his diet. He avoided anything made from flour and processed sugar. Mackarness believed that hidden food allergies from "wrong foods" such as sugar cause violent behavior.

He married Margaret Perry-Walker in 1947. They had a son, Patrick. Mackarness died of a stroke on 18 March 1996 in Mornington, Australia.

== Books ==
=== Eat Fat and Grow Slim ===
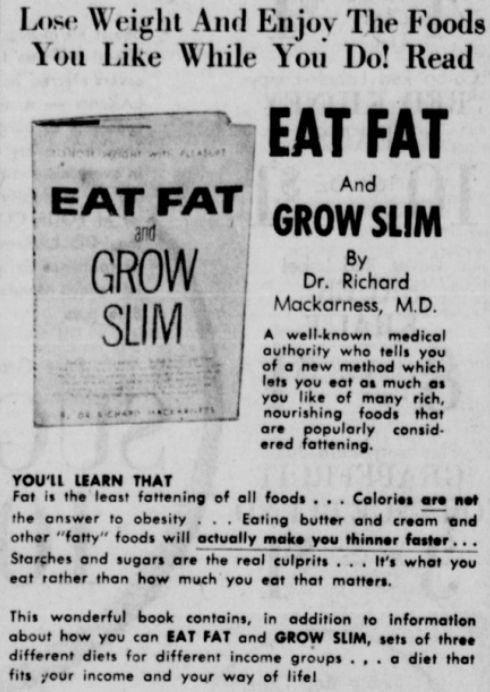
Advert for Eat Fat and Grow Slim

Mackarness authored the book Eat Fat and Grow Slim (1958), which exposed what he termed the "calorie fallacy" and proposed a low-carbohydrate "Stone Age" diet of fat and protein. He took influence from the ideas of William Banting. His Stone Age diet was influenced by the habits of Stone Age people with an emphasis on fish, meat, simple vegetables and roots. Mackarness opposed the consumption of cow's milk, grain, soy and sugar. The book was a success and sold over 1.5 million copies.

Dietitian Margaret A. Ohlson negatively reviewed Eat Fat and Grow Slim, describing it as "another book on diet, based on a minimum of fact but supported by many chapters of what can only be described as propaganda based on a badly digested series of half truths and some outright errors". Ohlson pointed out fallacies in the book such as the claim that an obese body is not capable of metabolizing carbohydrate but can metabolize fat with ease. The book was included in a list of non-recommended nutrition books by the New York State College of Home Economics. Physiologist Ancel Keys criticized Eat Fat and Grow Slim and commented that it "offers no scientific evidence, but the cartoons of imaginary biochemical processes are amusing, though they have nothing to do with scientific reality."

=== Not All in the Mind ===
Mackarness authored Not All in the Mind in 1976, which argued that common foods such as coffee, eggs, milk and white flour may make people mentally and physically ill. He recommended his Stone Age diet in the book and stated that humans have not evolved to consume foods from the rise of agriculture such as milk and wheat resulting in hidden food allergies that can cause chronic health problems.

In the book Mackarness listed four doctors who had used a Stone Age type diet to treat their patients. Mackarness had personally met these doctors in 1958 and termed them "anti-cereal doctors". They were: Ray Lawson, a surgeon from Montreal, Alfred W. Pennington of New Jersey, George L. Thorpe of Wichita, and Blake F. Donaldson of New York.

== Selected publications ==
- Eat Fat and Grow Slim: Or, Banting Up to Date (1958, with a foreword by William Heneage Ogilvie and an Introduction by Franklin Bicknell)
- Stone Age Diet for Functional Disorders (1959)
- Eating Dangerously: The Hazards of Allergies (1976)
- Not All in the Mind (Pan Books, 1976) ISBN 0-330-24592-9
- Food and Health (1978)
- Chemical Victims (1980)
- A Little of What You Fancy: How to Control Smoking and Other Cravings (1985)
- Chemical Allergies (1990)

== See also ==
- Walter L. Voegtlin
