= Staffan Lindeberg =

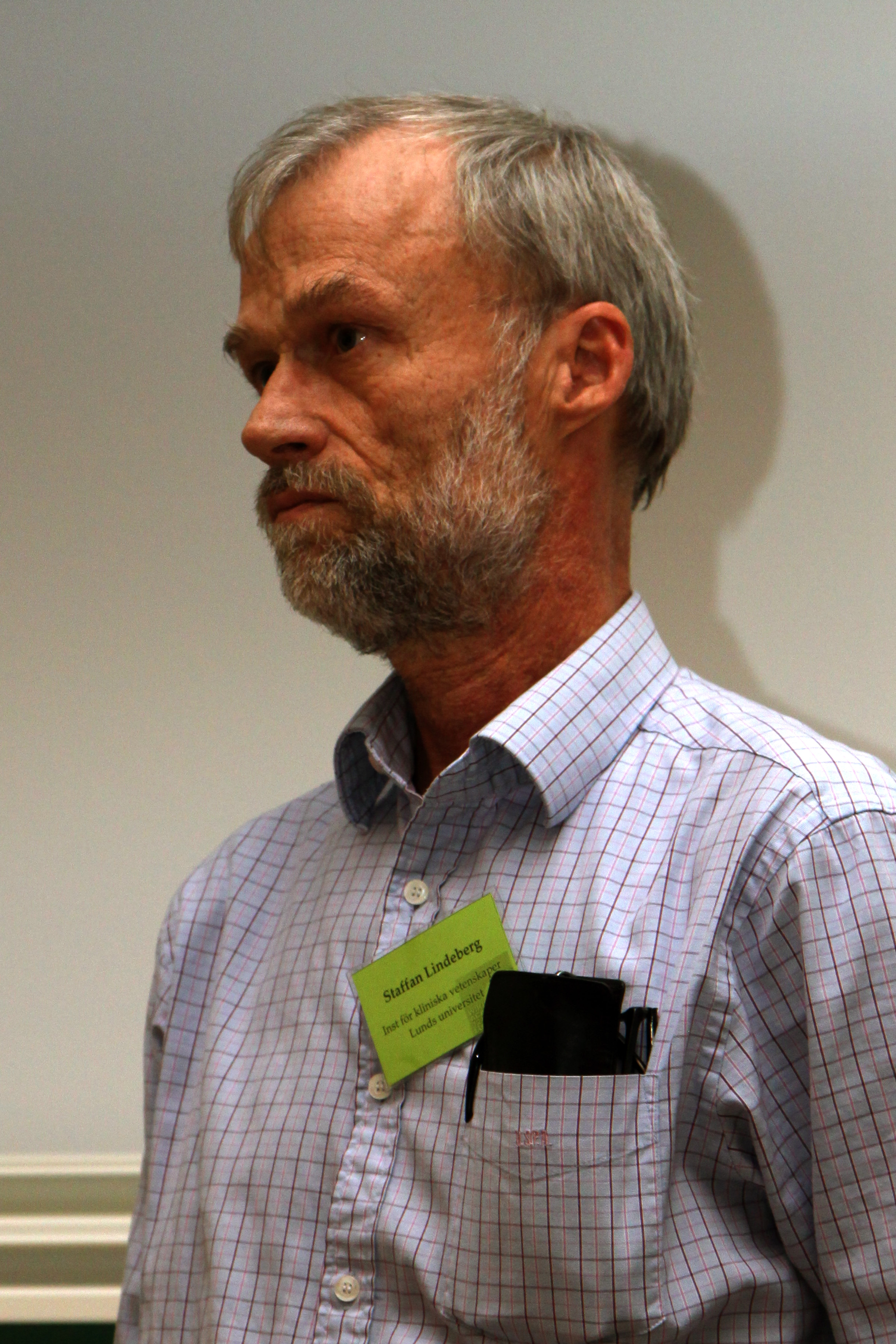
- Born: 1950
- Died: 2016 (aged 65–66)
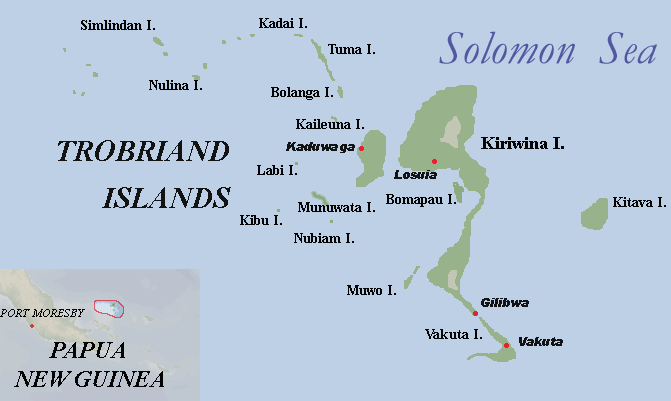
- Known for: The Kitava Study (A study of the diet and health of the people living on Kitava Island, Papua New Guinea; study of a people with a traditional, non-westernized diet) Trobriand Islands, Papua New Guinea, showing location of Kitava Island

Staffan Lindeberg (1950–2016) was an associate professor of family medicine at the Department of Medicine, University of Lund, Sweden. He was a practicing GP at St Lars Primary Health Care Center, Lund, Sweden. Lindeberg researched the Paleolithic diet.

== Works ==
=== Dissertation ===
- Apparent absence of cerebrocardiovascular disease in Melanesians. Risk factors and nutritional considerations – the Kitava Study (Lund, Sweden: Lund University, 1994)

=== Published research articles ===
- Cardiovascular risk factors in a Melanesian population apparently free from stroke and ischaemic heart disease: the Kitava study (Journal of Internal Medicine. 1994 Sep;236(3):331-40.)

=== Books ===
- Food and Western Disease: Health and nutrition from an evolutionary perspective (Wiley-Blackwell, December 2009) ISBN 978-1-4051-9771-7

== See also ==
- Paleolithic diet
- Hunter-gatherer
- Stanley Boyd Eaton, researcher
- Melvin Konner, researcher
- Loren Cordain, researcher
