= Loren Cordain =

American scientist

- Born: October 24, 1950 (age 75)
- Education: Pacific University; University of Nevada-Reno; University of Utah
- Scientific career
- Fields: Health Sciences; Exercise Physiology
- Workplaces: Colorado State University
- Website: The Paleo Diet

Loren Cordain (born October 24, 1950) is an American scientist who specializes in the fields of nutrition and exercise physiology. He is notable as an advocate of the Paleolithic diet.

== Education ==
Loren Cordain obtained a B.S. in Health Sciences from Pacific University, Forest Grove, Oregon in 1972. In 1978 he got his M.Sc. in Exercise Physiology at the University of Nevada-Reno. In 1981 he was awarded his Ph.D. in Exercise Physiology by the University of Utah, Salt Lake City.

== Career ==
He is currently professor emeritus in the Department of Health and Exercise Science at Colorado State University as of 2013.

== Selected works ==
=== Books ===
- The Paleo Diet, John Wiley & Sons (2002)
- The Paleo Diet Revised: Lose Weight and Get Healthy by Eating the Foods You Were Designed to Eat, Houghton Mifflin Harcourt (Revised edition December 7, 2010) ISBN 0470913029
- The Paleo Diet for Athletes: The Ancient Nutritional Formula for Peak Athletic Performance (with Joe Friel) Rodale Books (Revised edition October 16, 2012) ISBN 160961917X
- "The Paleo Diet Cookbook: More Than 150 Recipes for Paleo Breakfasts, Lunches, Dinners, Snacks, and Beverages" (with Nell Stephenson) Houghton Mifflin Harcourt (December 7, 2010) ISBN 0470913045
- "The Paleo Answer: 7 Days to Lose Weight, Feel Great, Stay Young", Houghton Mifflin Harcourt (October 16, 2012) ISBN 1118404157

=== Articles ===
- Cordain, L. (1999). "Cereal grains: humanity’s double-edged sword". World Review of Nutrition and Dietetics. 84:19-73.
- O’Keefe J.H., Cordain L. (2004) "Cardiovascular disease as a result of a diet and lifestyle at odds with our Paleolithic genome: how to become a 21st century hunter-gatherer". Mayo Clinic Proceedings 79:101-108.
- Cordain L, Eaton SB, Sebastian A, Mann, N, Lindeberg S, Watkins BA, O’Keefe JH, Brand Miller J. (2005) "Origins and Evolution of the Western Diet: Health Implications for the 21st Century". American Journal of Clinical Nutrition 81:341-54.
- Cordain L, Eaton SB, Brand Miller J, Lindeberg S, Jensen C, "An evolutionary analysis of the etiology and pathogenesis of juvenile-onset myopia". Acta Ophthalmologica Scandinavica Vol. 80 No. 2:125–35.
- Cordain L, Lindeberg S, Hurtado M, Hill K, Eaton SB, Brand-Miller J, "Acne vulgaris: a disease of Western civilization". Archives of Dermatology V138 No. 12:1584-90.
- Cordain L, (2005) "Implications for the role of diet in acne". Seminars in Cutaneous Medicine and Surgery Vol. 24 No 2:84-91.

== See also ==
- Paleolithic diet
- Walter L. Voegtlin
- Hunter-gatherer
- Stanley Boyd Eaton, researcher
- Melvin Konner, researcher
- Staffan Lindeberg, researcher
