= AAEM =

AAEM may refer to:

- Alkali anion exchange membrane
- American Academy of Emergency Medicine
- American Academy of Environmental Medicine
