= Stanley Boyd Eaton =

American radiologist and nutritionist

S. Boyd Eaton
- Born: March 18, 1938 (age 87); Old Town, Maine
- Occupation: Radiologist
- Known for: Paleo diet
- Notable work: Paleolithic Nutrition

S. Boyd Eaton is a radiologist and one of the originators of the concept of Paleolithic nutrition. In 1985, he and Melvin Konner published a paper, Paleolithic Nutrition, in The New England Journal of Medicine which attracted some attention from other researchers.

== Life ==
Eaton was born on March 18, 1938, in Old Town, Maine. He attended Duke University, graduating cum laude in 1960. He graduated cum laude from Harvard Medical School in 1964. His residency and fellowship training took place at the Massachusetts General Hospital (1965–69).

== Career ==
S. Boyd Eaton practiced diagnostic radiology for 41 years, specializing in musculoskeletal disorders. His patients often included members of the Atlanta Braves, the Atlanta Hawks, and the Atlanta Falcons. He worked in West Paces Ferry Hospital for most of his career.

In 1988, Eaton, Konner and Marjorie Shostak expanded upon their previously proposed “discordance hypothesis” in The Paleolithic Prescription (Harper & Rowe), the first book in what would become one of the bestselling health categories worldwide. This theory proposes that conditions such as high blood pressure, obesity and type 2 diabetes result in part from the mismatch between the lifestyle common in developed nations and that for which the human genome was originally selected (through natural selection) during the Stone Age. Loren Cordain writes, “There is no doubt in my mind that without Dr. Eaton... Paleo would not have become a household term now recognized by millions”.

Eaton was adjunct associate professor of anthropology at Emory University, and also clinical associate professor of radiology at Emory's School of Medicine. In 1996 he was medical director of the Olympic Village Polyclinic during the Centennial Olympic Games.

He was featured in the 2012 documentary The Perfect Human Diet.

== Selected publications ==
- Eaton, Stanley Boyd, and Stanley Boyd Eaton III. "Paleolithic vs. modern diets–selected pathophysiological implications." European journal of nutrition39.2 (2000): 67-70.
- Eaton, S. Boyd, et al. "Dietary intake of long-chain polyunsaturated fatty acids during the paleolithic." World review of nutrition and dietetics 83 (1998): 12-23.
- Eaton, Stanley Boyd. "Radiology of the Pancreas and Duodenum." (1973).
- Eaton, S. Boyd, Stanley B. Eaton III, and Loren Cordain. "Evolution, diet, and health." Human diet: Its origin and evolution (2002): 7-18.
- Eaton, S. Boyd, Stanley B. Eaton III, and Melvin J. Konner. "Paleolithic nutrition revisited." Evolutionary medicine (1999): 313-332.
- Ungar, Peter S., and Mark Franklyn Teaford, eds. Human diet: its origin and evolution. Greenwood Publishing Group, 2002.

== See also ==
- Paleolithic diet
- Hunter-gatherer
- Melvin Konner, researcher
- Loren Cordain, researcher
- Staffan Lindeberg, researcher
- Jared Diamond
- Richard Leakey
- Louis Leakey
- Mary Leakey
