= Arthur C. Ford =

First African American to become commissioner in the government of New York City

Arthur C. Ford (1892 - April 13, 1985) became the first African American to become commissioner in the government of New York City when Mayor Robert F. Wagner appointed him president of the New York City Department of Water Supply, Gas and Electricity in 1954. Ford was subsequently appointed president of the Board, later Bureau, of Water Supply in September 1957, a post he held until retirement in 1965. He first employment with NYC was in 1924, as a structural-steel draftsman with the Board of Transportation.

Ford was born in Washington, D.C., and raised in Montana, where he earned an engineering degree at Montana State College. He opposed the addition of fluoride to city waters from the mid fifties until his retirement in 1965, famously informing the New York City Board of Estimate that, “The water supply system of this city is not a gigantic medicine bottle into which one may combine ingredients and shake well before using. We control the concentration of fluoride going into the water at the beginning. But no one knows what concentration will reach the households, except that it will be different all over the city.”

== See also ==
- George Waldbott
- Philip R. N. Sutton
- List of African-American firsts
