= Margaret Diesendorf =

Australian poet, editor and translator

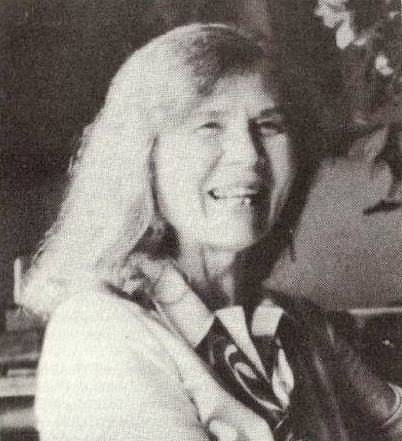
- Born: 15 May 1912; Vienna
- Died: 22 April 1993 (age 80); Canberra
- Occupations: Linguist, poet
- Spouse: Walter Diesendorf

Margaret Diesendorf née Máté (MA, D.Phil.), (1912–1993), was an Australian linguist, poet, editor, translator, and educationist. Born in Vienna, Austria, Diesendorf migrated to Australia in 1939. She published two books of poetry, made numerous translations of other people's works, and with Grace Perry, edited Poetry Australia.

== Life ==
=== Early years ===
Diesendorf was born Margaretha Amalia Gisela Máté, in Vienna on 15 May 1912, of Catholic parents, Stefan Máté and Amalia Maiwald of Hungarian and Viennese background. During World War I she was sent to her grandparents in Hungary, where she spoke Hungarian and so became bilingual at an early age. At school in Vienna, young Margaretha Máté was advanced, missing the fourth year, and passing the entrance for a selective school where only 5% of the students were girls, with "Nicht ein roter Strich" ("not a single red mark"). She studied Latin and soon mastered English, devouring the works of Shakespeare, Charles Dickens and the Brontës. Dissatisfied with a badly revised performance of Schlegel's translation of Macbeth, she commenced her own translation of the Witches Scene (Act 1, Scenes 1 & 3). She read German and French including Goethe, Émile Zola and Racine, and took a particular interest in the neglected area of Austrian literature. She studied the works of Sigmund Freud and was strongly influenced by the German Expressionist Movement. When Máté was fourteen, John Galsworthy visited the University of Vienna as a guest lecturer. As an avid reader of Galsworthy, she was taken to the lecture by her teacher, and called to the stage by Galsworthy when it turned out she was the only person in the largely academic audience who had read his latest work. They discussed Indian Summer. This was the beginning of the first of her many communications with writers, artists and philosophers which were ultimately to comprise an archive of letters, including her responses, always duplicated with carbon paper.

Three important aspects of Máté's life at this time were to affect her later life and work. Firstly, she discovered her aptitude for story-telling, and often used this skill at school. Secondly, Máté formed a close friendship with a beautiful Jewish girl, Maria, who, with her raven hair, white skin and red lips, became linked in Máté's vivid imagination, alternately with Snow White and the female heroines of the Bible. It was through her association with Maria, whose family disappeared in 1938, that Máté was personally confronted with Aryan racism. The families of the two girls shared a connection with the Viennese Opera. A passionate love of song and dance was to remain with Máté all her life and influence the rhythm of her poetry. The third important aspect of this time was the death of her beloved uncle, who she nursed through his last illness, doing her homework at his desk by his bedside. This event brought her to a sudden realisation of the reality of death, and the fact that she herself would die. This was later to become an aspect of her poetry.

Máté attended the University of Vienna, where at the age of twenty-three, she was the youngest-ever recipient of a PhD for her thesis Die Dichtungssprache des Expressionismus (The Literary Language of Expressionism). She then gained the "Lehramt", a master's degree in education. Máté was in France undertaking post-doctoral work at the time of the "Anschluss", March 1938.

=== Australia ===
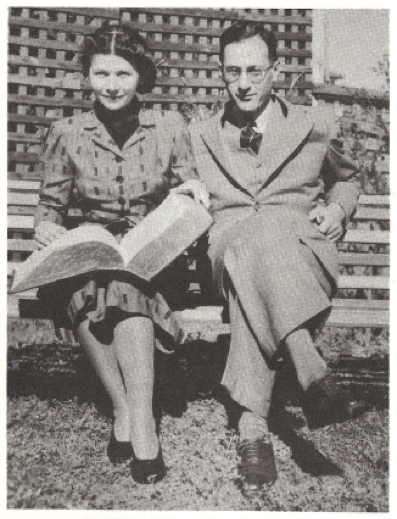
Margaret Diesendorf and her husband, the engineer Walter Diesendorf, in Sydney, (1940s)

In September 1938, determined that her "linguistic brilliance should not serve Aryan totalitarianism", Margaretha Máté fled Austria, crossing the Swiss border at Buchs, and finding shelter with friends of her admirer, the Jewish engineer, Dr Walter Diesendorf, who was soon to sail for Australia, and who obtained her a visa to join him.

She sailed from Antwerp on the German cargo ship MV Leuna in March 1939 in continual fear of exposure. She attracted the attention of Australian immigration authorities by departing the ship early, at Adelaide, due to a war scare and travelling to Melbourne by train, and in May 1939 was reunited with Walter Diesendorf in Sydney, where Walter had found employment with the Sydney County Council as an electrical engineer. In mid-1939 Máté found a position teaching languages at Sydney Church of England Girls Grammar School, Moss Vale, where her vivacious nature and dedication, which included protecting her class from a savage bull, endeared her to both staff and students. However, she remained at SCEGGS only briefly, as she left to marry Walter Diesendorf in 1940.

The Diesendorfs lived for a time at Rose Bay, where Margaret taught at the Convent of the Sacred Heart and at Ascham School. In 1946, with their young sons Mark and John, the family purchased a home in Eastwood, where Margaret was to live for more than forty years. From 1946 onwards Margaret Diesendorf made contributions to the letters columns of The Sydney Morning Herald on feminist and social issues which earned her the title of "the Conscience of New South Wales". Among her projects were successful campaigns to increase Australian research into poliomyelitis and to stop the use of X-ray machines in shoe shops.

Throughout the 1950 and 60s, while teaching part-time, Diesendorf had numerous involvements in education, among them addressing the Wyndham Enquiry into public education. She was active in the Teachers Federation and the Federation of Parents and Citizens, and was the leading speaker at meetings throughout New South Wales in a campaign against Wyndham's recommendation to adopt solely comprehensive high schools, and in favour of the retention of selective high schools for talented students. She advocated the teaching of languages to young children, and presented Moliere's one-act plays, with ten-year-old actors, in the local church hall. She was elected to the committee of the Sydney University Arts Association, was editorial secretary of the Sydney University English Association and urged for the establishment of a chair in Australian Literature.

=== Translation ===
From 1956 Diesendorf collaborated with the French poet Louis Dautheuil, translating a series of his poems into English, resulting in a bilingual publication in 1959 of Sonnets de l'ingénieur (Sonnets of an Engineer). In 1960 she accompanied her husband Walter Diesendorf on a business trip to Europe for the Snowy Mountains Authority, and was reunited with her mother and stepfather after twenty two years separation. On this trip she also met Dautheuil in person and established a friendship and collaboration across the globe translating poetry between English and French.

Diesendorf's vision for cross-cultural fertilisation in creative writing was embraced by Grace Perry, editor of Poetry Magazine. A double issue was published in 1964 as a bilingual edition containing 24 poems by 16 leading Australian poets with facing translations to French by Dautheuil and Diesendorf.

This publication embodied the editorial vision that "poetry shall cross linguistic barriers". It was enthusiastically supported by the French Embassy which distributed 3000 copies in the French-speaking world. But the project met with inflexible opposition from some executive members of the Poetry Society of Australia who held conservative editorial views This clash of views led Grace Perry to found South Head Press and publish a new journal Poetry Australia with the committed support of Diesendorf and other progressives. This was effectively an Australian "secession" that modernised and internationalised the Australian literary scene, and paved the way for numerous other multicultural literary and artistic ventures that followed.

By the mid-1960s, being highly regarded as a translator between English, French and German, Diesendorf and was engaged by the Australian Broadcasting Corporation to translate a series of field interviews with contemporary French writers, including Louis Aragon, René Victor Pilhes, Claude Simon and Alain Robbe-Grillet for the program Today's Writing.

1967 saw two significant international publications of Australian poetry recreated in French. Editions Seghers (Paris) published, in their Autour du Monde series, L'Enfant Au Cacatoès (Child with a Cockatoo), poems of Australian poet Rosemary Dobson with facing translations by Dautheuil and Diesendorf. In the same year a leading French-Canadian journal, in an issue of recent international poetry, included a substantial section on new poetry from Australia, with an introduction by Diesendorf and her translations of poems by six leading Australian poets to French.

In subsequent years, when her main creative focus had become original poetry, Diesendorf continued to publish translations between English French and German, and would also create poems for bilingual publication in English and a second language together.

In 1988 Poetry Australia published The Body the Altar/ Der Körper Der Altar a bilingual volume of 72 translations into German by Diesendorf of selected poems of Grace Perry as "a last act of love to a colleague and friend". Diesendorf's approach to the translation of poetry was not to translate word for word, but to get to the heart of the original poet's inspiration and recreate it, with the same sentiments, style and meter, in the new language. She said:

"The innocent first vision of the original has to be carried intact and fresh.... through the Death Valley of experience. ..... The translator must retrace the poet's creative process solely in the footsteps of his imagination"

By the time of her death in 1993, Diesendorf had also created a large number of her own English translations of her favourite poet in the German language, the Bohemian-Austrian poet Rainer Maria Rilke.

=== Editing and writing ===
I have locked myself in my room
chewing the betelnut of despair,
when the Devil knocks at the door:
"Let me in let me in let me in!
I can cure your lover with magic."
I open the door and say: "You're
known for setting your price rather high,"
and he grins with a hundredweight
sigh.....

—The Magic Bullet, Light, (1981)

From about 1963 Diesendorf began to focus more on her own writing than on teaching. In 1964, together with Dr Grace Perry, she founded the literary magazine Poetry Australia, with an aim to bring "a more adventurous and multi-cultural flavour" to the publication of Australian poetry. From 1964, she continued as associate editor, until 1981.

In 1970 Diesendorf accompanied her husband Walter to America where he undertook a half sabbatical as visiting professor at Rensselaer Polytechnic Institute in New York. In this period Diesendorf became more familiar with the Literary scene in the USA. This led to an editorial collaboration with Syed Amanuddin in the journal Creative Moment and other publications of Poetry Eastwest, including the publication in 1975 of a small volume of Diesendorf's original poetry. In 1973 Walter was diagnosed with cancer. At the time of her husband's illness, Diesendorf's poem Light won the Borestone Mountain Poetry Award for the best poem in the English language, an award that she was to win again in 1976 with The Hero.

After Walter's death in 1976, and suffering from acute allergies which made social contact difficult for her, Diesendorf turned increasingly to writing poems, many of which were published in papers and journals, both in Australia and the US, including Poetry Australia, Quadrant, The Bulletin, Arena, and New Poetry from Australia (USA). Two collections of poetry were published: Light in 1981 and Holding the Golden Apple in 1991.

In 1991 Diesendorf moved from her home at Eastwood to be nearer family in Canberra, where she quickly found friends in Canberra's literary circles, and became a literary advisor of Redoubt, a journal published three times a year by the University of Canberra to highlight the work of promising young writers.

=== Death and legacy ===
In 1993, Diesendorf, not well, had a happy weekend with her children, grandchildren and friends, attending a Spring Festival in Bowral, where her poetry was read and she was the toast of the party. On the Sunday she went to an exhibition of French Impressionist paintings at the National Gallery, and wrote her last poem on a page of a calendar showing Monet's Waterlilies. The following day, it was apparent that she had pneumonia. Diesendorf refused medication and hospitalisation, asking the doctor only that she take care of her cat, Bibby. She died in Canberra, Australian Capital Territory on 22 April 1993.

"There is much about light that we don't understand:
the way it gathers in a man
suddenly
to shine with the brightness of ten thousand watts
from his eyes....

—Light, Light (1981)

Margaret Diesendorf arrived in Australia at a time of cultural insularity. She used her knowledge of language and her passionate commitment to education to contribute to both a world view of literature in young Australians, and a knowledge of contemporary Australian literature outside Australia. Her published poetry contributed greatly to the expanding body of literary works by recent immigrants. Her editing presented to the reading public the works of many contemporary Australian poets, both established and previously unknown. She left to the nation her archive of poetry, prose and letters which include her correspondence with Robert Graves, A.D. Hope, Gwen Harwood, Lloyd Rees, Rosemary Dobson, Grace Perry, D.J. Enright and Judith Wright.

John Diesendorf, writing of his parents' achievements, compared his mother's gifts to those of his father, Walter Diesendorf the electrical engineer:

"The lives of Walter and Margaret Diesendorf have brought light to Australia: physical light and spiritual light, with the energy of water and the sun, and with the power of love for humanity."

=== Poetry ===
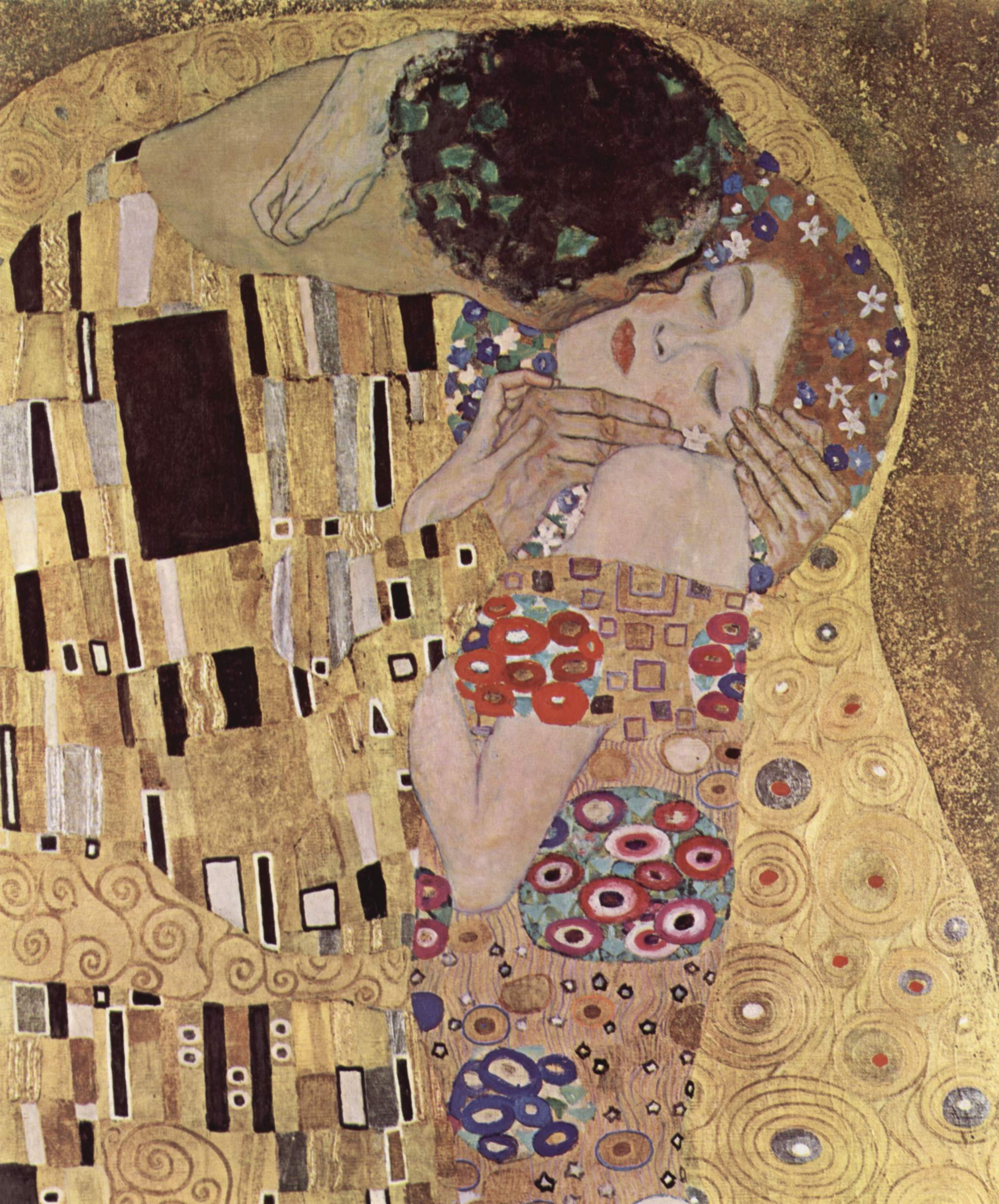
The Kiss by Gustav Klimt. Many of Diesendorf's poems were inspired by paintings.

Of Margaret Diesendorf's original poetry, more than 600 poems were published during her lifetime in literary journals, anthologies and newspapers. In 1981 the first major book of her collected poems in English was published by Edwards and Shaw, Sydney, with the assistance of the Literature Board of the Australia Council. This book is named Light, after the poem with which she had won The Borestone Mountain Poetry Award for 1974. It is characteristic of Diesendorf that another substantial volume, published ten years later at the age of 69 by Phoenix Press, Holding the Golden Apple, comprised love poems.

The poem Light encapsulates those qualities of personal vision that characterise Diesendorf's poetry. She brought to insular Australia her experiences of Europe, memories of music, art and gaiety, tempered by loss, deprivation and courage. In one short poem she touches on the love of her dying husband, her childhood poverty and the death of her baby brother, transforming each image with the radiance of light into something beautiful.

The book Light is divided into two sections, the first of which, titled On Canvas, contains a number of poems which are direct responses to art works, both European and Australian. Among those which are the subject for her pen are Modigliani's Portrait of Jeanne Hebuterne, Vincent van Gogh's Church at Auvers, Gustav Klimt's The Kiss, Salvador Dalí's La Beigneuse, Brett Whiteley's Soup Kitchen, and Lloyd Rees's The Pinnacle, Mt Wellington.

Her later book, Holding the Golden Apple, dedicated to Robert Graves, is described as a collection of poems "that have sprung wholly and directly from personal and vicarious encounters with love". In the introduction Jacques Delaruelle says that in Diesendorf's poems, the modest phenomena of nature, the beating heart, the trembling hand, "are endowed with the aura of the most sacred rituals, and the pristine simplicity of the poet's words tells us that the process of life is identical to the process of creation."

== Awards and tributes ==
- Pacific Books Publishers 'Best Poems' Awards for 1972 and 1973
- The Borestone Mountain Poetry Award for 1974 and 1976.
- Works dedicated to Margaret Diesendorf include Gwen Harwood's Three Poems to Margaret Diesendorf, Grace Perry's Translation and Philip Grundy's To a Trilingual Poet.

== Works ==
- Towards the Sun: (Poems by Margaret Diesendorf), World Poetry Pamphlet No.1, Poetry Eastwest, 1975 ISBN 0 912206 59 4
- Light: Poems by Margaret Diesendorf, Edwards and Shaw, Sydney, (1981) ISBN 0 85551 030 7
- Holding the Golden Apple: Love Poems, Phoenix Publications, Brisbane (1991) ISBN 0 949780 18 9

=== Translation ===
- Rosemary Dobson, L'Enfant au Cacatoès trans. M. Diesendorf & L. Dautheuil (Pierre Seghers, 1965)
- Grace Perry, Der Kőrper der Altar trans. M. Diesendorf (South Head Press, 1988)

== Bibliography ==
- The Australian Literary Resource, Margaret Diesendorf
- Debra Adelaide, Australian Women Writers, A Bibliographic Guide, Pandora Press – an imprint of Allen & Unwin Australia Pty Ltd (1988), ISBN 0 86358 149 8
- Heather Cam, Hypothesis tested and found wanting, Sydney Morning Herald, (23 June 1989), (accessed: 22 May 2012)
- John Diesendorf, Light, in Strauss to Matilda : Viennese in Australia, 1938–1988, Karl Bittman, editor, Wenkart Foundation, Leichhardt (1988). ISBN 0731609824
- Margaret Diesendorf, Zwischenland, The Secondary Teacher, (May 1970) pp. 12–18
- Margaret Diesendorf, sub judice, Outrider, No.1. (1987) pp. 39–44
- Rudi Krausmann, M.A.T.I.A. Literature: Multicultural Arts Today in Australia: Interview of Margaret Diesendorf, Australia Council, (1987) pp. 1–3.
- Elizabeth Perkins, Gender and Equality in the Poetry of Margaret Diesendorf and Dorothy Auchterlonie, Book: Poetry and Gender, Statements and Essays in Australian Women's Poetry and Poetics, Editors David Brooks & Brenda Walker, University of Queensland Press, 1989. ISBN 0 7022 2240 2
- Manfred Jurgensen, Eagle and Emu: German – Australian Writing 1930 – 1990,(Historical Critical Analysis), Ch. 8, pp. 301–314, University of Queensland Press, (1992). ISBN 0 7022 2240 2
- Oxford Companion to Australian Literature: Margaret Diesendorf (accessed:22-05-2012)
