= Walter Diesendorf =

Dr Walter Diesendorf, about 1970

Walter Diesendorf (1906–1975), was an Austrian-born Australian electrical engineer known for his work on high-voltage transmission systems, in particular for the Snowy River Hydro-electric Scheme.

== Early life and emigration ==
Walter Diesendorf was born in Vienna on 14 December 1906, the son of Jewish parents, Eljukim Wolf and Henie Diesendorf. He attended the Technische Hochschule (later Technical University of Vienna) qualifying in engineering in 1929. He attained a doctorate of technical sciences in 1934 and worked in industry. When Austria was annexed by Nazi Germany in 1938, Diesendorf emigrated to Australia and settled in Sydney. Diesendorf was followed to Australia by his fiancée, the teacher and poet, Dr Margaret Máté whom he married on 22 December 1939. Walter and Margaret Diesendorf, who were both multi-lingual, quickly established themselves in the local engineering and literary communities. They became naturalised Australians in 1944, and had two sons, scientist Dr Mark Diesendorf and engineer John Diesendorf.

== Career ==
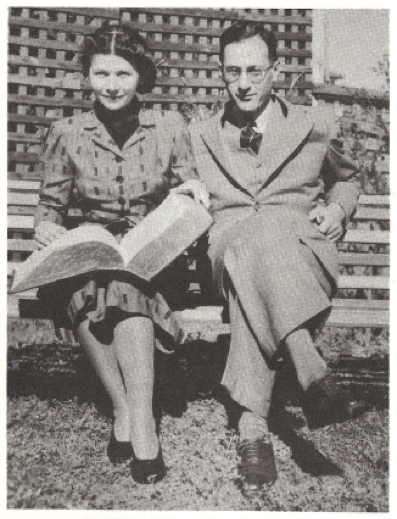
Walter Diesendorf and his wife the poet Margaret Diesendorf, Sydney (1940s)

In 1939 Diesendorf gained employment as an assistant-engineer for the power-distribution body, Sydney County Council, to make "abstruse technical calculations for high voltage transmission systems which could not be done by an ordinary engineer in Australia or anywhere else". This description was proffered by the County Council to silence criticism of their employment of a migrant Jew. During World War II Diesendorf planned the development of Sydney's 33,000-volt underground-cable network. After the war he designed transmission systems for a major expansion of the New South Wales power industry.

With the establishment of the Electricity Commission of New South Wales in 1950 Diesendorf joined the Snowy Mountains Hydro-electric Authority as system design engineer and in 1958 was appointed Senior Executive Engineer for electrical and mechanical activities. His joint paper "The 330kV Transmission System in New South Wales" was awarded the institution's electrical engineering prize and was instrumental in bringing about the adoption of the 330,000-volt system in Australia, at a time when the maximum voltage at use worldwide was generally 200,000 volts. Diesendorf lived at this time at Cooma in the Snowy Mountains, with his wife and sons visiting to enjoy mountain walking and skiing holidays.

Diesendorf was a member of the Institution of Engineers, Australia, of which he became a Fellow in 1957; the Société des Ingénieurs de France and the Conférence Internationale des Grands Réseaux Electriques à Haute Tension. On his retirement from the Snowy River Authority in 1967, he became Senior Lecturer in electrical engineering at the University of Sydney. In 1970–71 he was visiting professor at the Rensselaer Polytechnic Institute, Troy, New York State, US. His Overvoltages on High Voltage Systems (Troy, 1971) became a standard text.

== Death ==
Diesendorf died of cancer on 29 December 1975 at Camperdown, Sydney, and was buried in Northern Suburbs cemetery.

== Awards ==
- Institution of Engineers, Australia, prize for electrical engineering 1955
- Institution of Engineers, Australia, prize for electrical engineering 1962

== Publications ==
- Walter Diesendorf, The 330kV Transmission System in New South Wales, Journal of the Institution of Engineers Australia, (1955)
- Walter Diesendorf, The Snowy Mountains scheme : phase 1, the Upper Tumut projects, Horwitz, Sydney, (1961)
- Walter Diesendorf, The Snowy Mountains scheme, Horwitz, Sydney, (1961)
- Walter Diesendorf, Pumping for hydro-electric power generation. part 1., fields of application, Monarc Group, Institute of Engineers (Aust.) (1961)
- Walter Diesendorf, Report on remote control and telemetering installations for Murray Development and system control, Snowy Mountains Hydro Electric Authority, Cooma, (1963)
- Walter Diesendorf, Overvoltages on High Voltage Systems: insulation design of transmission lines and substations, Troy, New York, Rensselaer Bookstore, (1971)
- Walter Diesendorf, Insulation co-ordination in high-voltage electric power systems, Butterworths, London, (1974), ISBN 0-408-70464-0
