= Ryan Bolton =

American triathlete

Ryan Bolton (born March 26, 1973, in Rapid City, South Dakota) is an American athlete and coach who competed in triathlon at the 2000 Summer Olympics.

Bolton competed in cross country, swimming and track for Campbell County High School in Gillette, Wyoming. He ran cross country and track for the University of Wyoming.

Bolton competed in the first Olympic triathlon, at the 2000 Summer Olympics. He finished in 25th place with a total time of 1:50:52.95. Bolton won the 2002 Ironman Triathlon at Lake Placid, New York. Bolton was coached by Joe Friel. He retired from competition in 2004, and has since been a coach for USA Triathlon.

Since 2009, Bolton has coached runners in Santa Fe, New Mexico with the Harambee Track Club, where he coached Caroline Rotich, winner of the 2015 Boston Marathon.
