= Melvin Konner =

American anthropologist

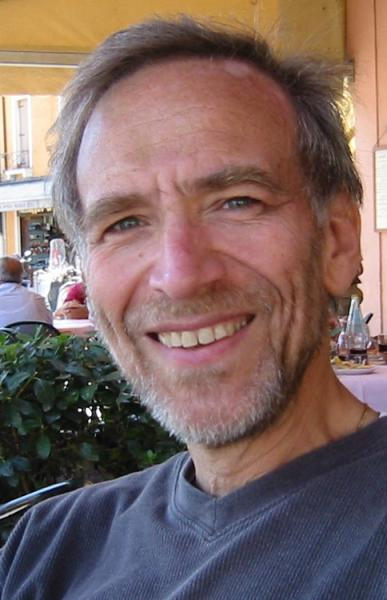
- Born: August 30, 1946 (age 79)
- Education: Brooklyn College (BA); Harvard University (PhD, MD)
- Scientific career
- Fields: Anthropology, behavioral biology
- Institutions: Harvard University; Emory University
- Thesis: Infants of a foraging people (1973)
- Website: www.melvinkonner.com

Melvin Joel Konner (born August 30, 1946) is an American anthropologist who is the Samuel Candler Dobbs Professor of Anthropology and of Neuroscience and Behavioral Biology at Emory University.

== Biography ==
Raised in an Orthodox Jewish family, Konner has stated that he lost his faith at age 17. He studied at Brooklyn College, CUNY (1966), where he met Marjorie Shostak, whom he later married and with whom he had three children. He earned a Ph.D. from Harvard University in 1973 and a M.D. from Harvard Medical School in 1985.

From 1985 on, he contributed substantially to developing the concept of a Paleolithic diet and its impact on health, publishing along with Stanley Boyd Eaton, and later also with his wife Marjorie Shostak and with Loren Cordain.

Konner has argued that women make better leaders than men.

== Selected bibliography ==
- Konner, Melvin J. (2019) Believers: Faith in Human Nature. W. W. Norton & Company. ISBN 978-0393651867
- Konner, Melvin J. (2015) Women After All: Sex, Evolution, and the End of Male Supremacy. W. W. Norton & Company. ISBN 978-0393352313
- Konner, Melvin J. (2010) The Evolution of Childhood. Cambridge, MA : The Belknap Press of Harvard University Press. ISBN 978-0674045668
- Konner, Melvin J. (2009) The Jewish Body. Knopf. ISBN 978-0805242362
- Konner, Melvin J. (2003) Unsettled: An Anthropology of the Jews. New York : Viking Compass. ISBN 978-0670032440
- Konner, Melvin J. (2002) The Tangled Wing: Biological Constraints on the Human Spirit, 2nd ed. (original 1982) New York: Times Books. ISBN 978-0805072792
- Konner, Melvin J. (1993) Medicine at the Crossroads: The Crisis in Healthcare. Pantheon Books. ISBN 978-0679415459
- Konner, Melvin J. (1990) Why the Reckless Survive . . . and Other Secrets of Human Nature. New York: Viking. ISBN 978-0670829361
- Konner, Melvin J. (1987) Becoming a Doctor: A Journey of Initiation in Medical School. New York: Viking. ISBN 978-0140111163

== See also ==
- Paleolithic diet
- Hunter-gatherer
- Stanley Boyd Eaton, researcher
- Loren Cordain, researcher
- Staffan Lindeberg, researcher
