= Joe Friel =

American triathlon coach

Joe Friel is an endurance sports coach, best known as an elite triathlon and cycling coach as well as an author.

Friel holds a master's degree in exercise science and is a USA Triathlon and USA Cycling certified elite-level coach. He is a founder and past Chairman of the USA Triathlon National Coaching Commission. He has also been active in business as the founder of TrainingPeaks, a web-based software company, and TrainingBible Coaching. His views on matters related to training for endurance sports have been featured in such publications as VeloNews, Outside, Runner’s World, and The New York Times.

Friel coached Ryan Bolton, an Olympic athlete and the winner of the 2002 Ironman Triathlon at Lake Placid. Friel uses the training philosophy of periodization developed by Tudor Bompa.

== Published works ==
- The Cyclist's Training Bible, Joe Friel (2018, previous editions 2012)
- Triathlon Science, Joe Friel & Jim Vance (2018)
- The Triathlete's Training Bible, Joe Friel (2024; previous English-language editions 2004, 2009, 2012, 2016; Spanish-language editions 2016, 2018)
- Fast after 50: How to race strong for the rest of your life, Joe Friel (2015)
- Going Long: Training for Triathlon's Ultimate Challenge, Joe Friel & Gordon Byrn (2013)
- The Power Meter Handbook: A User's Guide for Cyclists and Triathletes, Joe Friel (2012)
- The Paleo Diet for Athletes, Loren Cordain & Joe Friel (2012)
- Total Heart Rate Training, Joe Friel (2009)
- The Mountain Biker's Training Bible, Joe Frel and Ned Overend (2009)
- Your First Triathlon (2006)
- Going Long: Training for Ironman-Distance Triathlons (2003)
