= Paleo Foundation =

Organization that certifies food products related to the Paleolithic diet

- Industry: Food Industry
- Key people: Karen Pendergrass
- Website: paleofoundation.com

The Paleo Foundation is a private American organization that certifies food products related to the Paleolithic and ketogenic diet.

== Programs ==
The organization currently issues a 'Certified Paleo' certification mark, with a previous iteration called "Paleo Friendly", for food products and dietary supplements that meet its standards. By 2018, it had certified food products from various food retailers and companies including Whole Foods, Walmart, and General Mills. Recently, the organization also begun certifying food products for its 'Keto Certified' program.

== Standards development ==
More recently, the organization has described the diet "as a diet based on the types of foods presumed to have been eaten by early humans before the advent of agriculture... These foods included meat and seafood, nuts and seeds, roots and tubers, and fruits and berries. The diet of our ancient Paleolithic ancestors presumably excluded dairy, grains, and highly refined foods."

In 2015, its founder, Karen Pendergrass, stated that the organization developed its standards for the Paleo diet based on "current research, archaeological records, paleogenetics, sustainability concerns, proposed health benefits, and input from various leading health experts of the Paleo Movement."

== Criticism ==
Many nutrition and law experts have also been critical of such food certification programs, citing fears of arbitrary criteria that lack evidence within the certification standards and the lack of regulation by government agencies. They have since not been investigated.

== See also ==
- Paleolithic diet
- Product certification
- Certification mark
- Mark Sisson
