= Clinical ecology =

Clinical ecology was the name given by proponents in the 1960s to a claim that exposure to low levels of certain chemical agents harm susceptible people, causing multiple chemical sensitivity and other disorders. Clinical ecologists are people that support and promote this offshoot of conventional medicine. They often have a background in the field of allergy or otorhinolaryngology, and the theoretical approach is derived in part from classic concepts of allergic responses, first articulated by Theron Randolph and developed by Richard Mackarness.

Clinical ecologists support a cause-and-effect relationship for non-specific symptoms reported by some people after low-dose exposure to chemical, biologic, or physical agents. This pattern of low-dose reaction is not generally accepted by toxicologists. Although some of the mainstream medical community continue to reject these claims, the concept is gaining some recognition under the modern and more clearly articulated classification of environmental medicine.

== Training and qualifications ==
"Clinical Ecologist" is an environmental approach that is consistent with the practice of holistic medicine. Practitioners with this orientation do not use the term "Clinical Ecologist," although those opposed to this complementary medicine approach to illness often still do. Unlike terms such as physician or nurse, the term clinical ecologist is not legally regulated in any jurisdiction, which means that any person may legally claim to be a clinical ecologist. If wanted, they may obtain an extralegal certification or membership from the unregulated private organization American Academy of Environmental Medicine upon payment of a fee.

Many clinical ecologists are traditionally licensed healthcare professionals who hold advanced traditional medical certifications. Others may have a more alternative training.

== History ==
Randolph published a number of books to promote clinical ecology and environmental medicine, including:

- Randolph, Theron G. (1962). Human ecology and susceptibility to the chemical environment. Springfield, Ill: Thomas. ISBN 0-398-01548-1.
- Moss, Ralph W.; Randolph, Theron G. (1980). An alternative approach to allergies: the new field of clinical ecology unravels the environmental causes of mental and physical ills. New York: Lippincott & Crowell. ISBN 0-690-01998-X.
- Randolph, Theron G. (1987). Environmental medicine: beginnings and bibliographies of clinical ecology. Fort Collins, CO: Clinical Ecology Publications. ISBN 0-943771-00-5.

In 1965, Randolph founded the Society for Clinical Ecology to promote his theories, based on his patients' symptoms, known as multiple chemical sensitivities (MCS).

During the 1980s, the movement was rejected by some medical organizations and judges, and health insurance companies often refused to pay their bills. According to its opponents, the society's name was changed from the Society for Clinical Ecology to The American Academy of Environmental Medicine (AAEM) to avoid its bad reputation.

Despite the confusion in the traditional medical establishment regarding the classification and treatment of MCS, MCS has achieved credibility in workers' compensation claims, tort liability, and regulatory actions. The pragmatic determination of MCS includes four elements: (1) the syndrome is acquired after a documentable environmental exposure that may have caused objective evidence of health effects; (2) the symptoms are referable to multiple organ systems and vary predictably in response to environmental stimuli; (3) the symptoms occur in relation to measurable levels of chemicals, but the levels are below those known to harm health; and (4) no objective evidence of organ damage can be found.

== Controversy ==
Randolph's theories about chemical effects have been criticized by toxicologists. His broader interpretation of "allergies" beyond that of IgE antibodies in true allergy conflicted with traditional allergists of his time. Of course, Randolph did not claim that environmental sensitivities were "true allergies" mediated by IgE, claiming this fine point was irrelevant to people suffering from non-allergic sensitivities. The turf war waged by allergists and defense expert witnesses during those years also has less relevance today than it once did. Several National Academy of Sciences workshops and Research Councils into Gulf War syndrome have validated the idiosyncratic effect low chemical exposure on sensitized individuals.

Clinical ecology is not a recognized medical specialty. Practitioners have been criticized for tricking mentally ill and suggestible patients into thinking that they were chemically sensitive. Twentieth century critics of clinical ecology charged that multiple chemical sensitivity (MCS) had never been clearly defined, no scientifically plausible mechanism has been proposed for it, no diagnostic tests have been substantiated, and not a single case has been scientifically proven. Well-conducted studies establishing the theories and practices of clinical ecology were not found in reviews of evidence supporting its practices by the American Medical Association in 1992, the American College of Physicians in 1989, the Canadian Psychiatric Association, the International Society of Regulatory Toxicology and Pharmacology in 1993, the American Academy of Allergy, Asthma and Immunology, and more recently by the American College of Occupational and Environmental Medicine in 1999.

The development of GMO food and the increased use of herbicides on food crops has resulted in an increased interest in the area of environmental sensitivities. A polarized debate has grown between supporters of the new agri-technology who characterize themselves as rational scientists and opponents as ignorant alarmists. On the other hand, the opponents characterize the supporters as dogmatic industry shills and themselves as critical thinkers and environmentalists. Both groups claim to be the majority opinion, although the only consensus that has weight is within the government organizations that rule on safety. At issue is the non-industry science that characterizes herbicides and the genetically engineered pesticides of GMO crops as endocrine disruptors. That disruption also triggers autoimmune system responses consistent with those observed by clinical ecologists.
