= Human Ecology, Human Economy =

1997 book edited by Mark Diesendorf and Clive Hamilton

Human Ecology, Human Economy: Ideas for an Ecologically Sustainable Future
- Author: Mark Diesendorf, Clive Hamilton
- Language: English
- Genre: Nonfiction
- Publisher: Allen & Unwin
- Publication date: 1997
- Pages: 378
- ISBN: 1864482885
- OCLC: 803740920

Human Ecology, Human Economy: Ideas for an Ecologically Sustainable Future is a 1997 book edited by Mark Diesendorf and Clive Hamilton. The authors' intent is to "develop some of the basic ideas, concepts and tools that are needed to create a set of preferred futures for the Earth". According to the editors, the book provides equal measures of human ecology and ecological economics, in order to assist the process of working towards a better future.

Human Ecology, Human Economy has been reviewed in Ecological Economics and The Australian Journal of Agricultural and Resource Economics.

== See also ==
- List of Australian environmental books
- Sustainability
- Ecologically sustainable development
