= American Academy of Environmental Medicine =

- Abbreviation: AAEM
- Formation: 1965
- Type: Professional association
- Headquarters: Wichita, KS
- Location: United States
- Official language: English
- President: Robin Bernhoft, M.D.
- Key people: President-Elect: Alvis L. Barrier, M.D., FAAOA; Secretary: James F. Coy, M.D.; Treasurer: James W. Willoughby, II, D.O.
- Website: www.aaemonline.org

The American Academy of Environmental Medicine (AAEM), founded in 1965 as the Society for Clinical Ecology, is an international association of physicians and associated professionals interested in the clinical aspects of ecological or environmental illnesses, which is called clinical ecology. The academy aims for recognition of ecologic illness as a medical diagnosis.

Composed primarily of traditionally trained physicians from many specialties, the principal goals of the AAEM are physician education and the expansion of medical knowledge about often-overlooked effects on human health of environmental exposures encountered in everyday life.

The AAEM opposes the use of mercury-containing compounds in any product for human consumption, including mercury in vaccines. The AAEM also opposes water fluoridation and has called for a moratorium on food from genetically modified crops. The AAEM has been cited as a questionable organization by Quackwatch for promoting discredited diagnoses like multiple chemical sensitivity, chronic candidiasis, and toxic mold syndrome.

== History ==
The Society for Clinical Ecology was founded in 1965, and inspired by the ideas of Theron Randolph. Clinical ecologists claimed that exposure to low levels of certain chemical agents harm susceptible people, causing multiple chemical sensitivity and other disorders.

Members of the academy may have a background in the field of allergy, and their theoretical approach is derived in part from non-standard concepts of allergic responses that were first articulated by Randolph in the 1960s.

In 1984 the Society changed its name to the American Academy of Environmental Medicine.

== Objectives ==
Some of the objectives of the academy are:

- To demonstrate that the concepts and techniques of environmental medicine are applicable to all fields of medical practice in which the physician is directly involved in patient care,
- To have the concept of optimal dose immunotherapy and the rotary diversified diet recognized as safe and effective, and
- To promote education and research in environmental medicine.

The academy aims at expanding the understanding of interactions between human individuals and their environment, with the ultimate objective of improving the individual's total health. The AAEM works towards the greater recognition, treatment and prevention of illnesses induced by exposures to various biological and chemical agents encountered in our environment, such as in air, food and water.

== Legitimacy ==
Proponents of clinical ecology may claim cause-and-effect relationships or low-dose effects that are not generally accepted by toxicologists (allergy, immunology and toxicology). Randolph's theories about how allergies happen, which he promoted from the founding of the field, are the original basis for the suspicious attitude of mainstream medical, legal, and scientific experts towards clinical ecology as a whole. Clinical management of MCS is often considered to be inconsistent with science.

Quackwatch lists the American Academy of Environmental Medicine as a questionable organization, and its certifying board, the American Board of Environmental Medicine as a dubious certifying board. They are not recognized by the American Board of Medical Specialties. In an article last updated in 2016, Quackwatch listed 29 AAEM doctors who were subject to regulatory actions.

== Activities ==
The academy holds meetings and seminars and provides information on diagnosis and treatment of ecologic illnesses.

The academy publishes a directory of members, which includes the procedures they employ in their practices. Proceedings of seminars, including some tape recordings, also have been published. The academy publishes a quarterly newsletter, The Environmental Physician.

== See also ==
- Clinical ecology
- Theron Randolph
- List of organizations opposing mainstream science

== Bibliography ==
- Nicholas A. Ashford, Claudia Miller, Chemical exposures: low levels and high stakes. 2nd ed. John Wiley & Sons, 1998. ISBN 0-471-29240-0
- Randolph, Theron G. (1962). Human ecology and susceptibility to the chemical environment. Springfield, Ill: Thomas. ISBN 0-398-01548-1.
- Moss, Ralph W.; Randolph, Theron G. (1980). An alternative approach to allergies: the new field of clinical ecology unravels the environmental causes of mental and physical ills. New York: Lippincott & Crowell. ISBN 0-690-01998-X.
- Randolph, Theron G. (1987). Environmental medicine: beginnings and bibliographies of clinical ecology. Fort Collins, CO: Clinical Ecology Publications. ISBN 0-943771-00-5.
