= John Millett (poet) =

Australian poet (1921–2019)

John Millett OAM
- Born: John Antill Millett; 3 February 1921; Woollahra, New South Wales, Australia
- Died: 19 May 2019 (aged 98); Labrador, Queensland, Australia
- Occupations: Poet, editor, lawyer
- Years active: 1962–2019
- Spouse: Marion Millett

John Antill Millett OAM (3 February 1921 – 19 May 2019) was an Australian poet, reviewer and poetry editor. He was editor of Poetry Australia magazine from 1987 until its demise in 1992.

== Early years ==
Millett was born in the Sydney suburb of Woollahra. His grandmother introduced him to adventure classics such as Robinson Crusoe, Ivanhoe, The Last of the Mohicans and the poems of Walter Scott.

Millett served in England during World War II as a wireless air gunner with the all-Australian RAAF No 10 Squadron, from which experience he wrote the popular Tail Arse Charlie, also adapted for ABC Radio.

After the war he worked in the Repatriation Department. He then went to study law at Sydney University graduating with LLB.

His book Blue Dynamite was dramatised by Bradley R. Strahan (editor of Visions International, where he had been regularly published) with the assistance of the Source theater group in Washington, D.C. where it was performed at several venues in 1988, including the Australian Embassy.

From 1962 he was involved with Poetry Australia, advising on legal and accountancy matters then becoming editor from 1987. The magazine was conceptualised by Grace Perry to be international while maintaining an Australian presence. International contributors included Ezra Pound, Ted Hughes, Seamus Heaney, Richard Murphy, Robert Peters and Margaret Atwood. Translations included early Russian poets by Rosemary Dobson and David Campbell, Laurence Springarn's translations from Portuguese and Mark Scrivener's translations of German classics. Poetry Australia also published special issues of New Zealand, Canadian, Italian, Japanese, Dutch and Flemish, American, Gaelic, French, Austrian, Swedish and Papua New Guinean poetry.

== Later years ==
John Millett continued as editor until 1992 when Poetry Australia ceased production. Millett subsequently helped to establish the Poetry Australia Fund and this fund was instrumental in the establishment in 2002 of the magazine Blue Dog: Australian Poetry, which editor Ron Pretty declared was in "direct line of succession from Poetry Australia".

His poetry has been likened to that of Kenneth Slessor. He became a member the Gold Coast Writers' Association. Millett won many rewards; the Victorian Premier’s Literary Award, the Scottish International Poetry Competition twice, the Max Harris Literary Award for poetry, and being short listed four times for the NSW Premier’s Awards. He was also honored in 1999 with a Medal of the Order of Australia for services to literature. He died in May 2019 at the age of 98.

== Poetry and other works ==
- Calendar Adam (1971)
- The Silences (1973)
- Love Tree of the Coomera (1975)
- West of the Cunderang (1977)
- "Tail Arse Charlie" in Poetry Australia (1982)
- A chapbook in the USA in 1983, Come Down Cunderang (1985)
- The Nine Lives of Big Meg O'Shannessy (1990)
- A play with Grace Perry, Last Bride at Longsleep (1981)
- Blue Dynamite (1987), also distributed in the USA by Black Buzzard Press and adapted for stage in 1988.

== External sources ==
- Brief Bio
- More details
