= Environmental medicine =

Medical specialty

Environmental medicine is a multidisciplinary field involving medicine, environmental science, chemistry and others, overlapping with environmental pathology. It can be viewed as the medical branch of the broader field of environmental health. The scope of this field involves studying the interactions between environment and human health, and the role of the environment in causing or mediating disease. This specialist field of study developed after the realisation that health is more widely and dramatically affected by environmental factors than previously recognized.

Environmental factors in the causation of environmental diseases can be classified into:

- Physical
- Chemical
- Biological
- Social (including Psychological and Culture variables)
- Ergonomic
- Safety
- Any combination of the above

In the United States, the American College of Preventive Medicine oversees board certification of physicians in Occupational and Environmental Medicine.

== Current focuses of environmental medicine ==
While environmental medicine is a broad field, some of the currently prominent issues include:

- The effects of ozone depletion and the resulting increase in UV radiation on humans with regard to skin cancer.
- The effects of nuclear accidents or the effects of a terrorist dirty bomb attack and the resulting effects of radioactive material and radiation on humans.
- The effects of chemicals on humans, such as dioxin, especially with regard to developmental effects and cancer. Others include PFOA/PFAS.
- Plastic pollution from Microplastics and Nanoplastics
- Radon gas exposure in individuals' homes.
- Air and water pollution on the health of individuals.
- Mercury poisoning and exposure to humans through including fish and sea life in their diet.
- Lead poisoning from leaded gasoline, paint, and plumbing.
- Water-borne diseases
- Food poisoning
- Indoor air quality

According to recent estimates, about 5 to 10% of disability-adjusted life years (DALY) lost are due to environmental causes. By far, the most important factor is fine particulate matter pollution in urban air.

== Scope of environmental medicine ==
Environmental medicine is concerned primarily with prevention. Food-borne infections or infections that are water-borne (e.g. cholera and gastroenteritis caused by norovirus or campylobacteria) are typical concerns of environmental medicine, but some opinions in the fields of microbiology hold that the viruses, bacteria and fungi that they study are not within the scope of environmental medicine if the spread of infection is directly from human to human. Much of epidemiology, which studies patterns of disease and injury, is not within the scope of environmental medicine, but e.g. air pollution epidemiology is a highly active branch of environmental health and environmental medicine. Any disease with a large genetic component usually falls outside the scope of environmental medicine, but in diseases like asthma or allergies both environmental and genetic approaches are needed.

== Military "environmental medicine" ==
The U.S. Army has, since at least 1961, used the term "environmental medicine" in a sense different from the above. Its U.S. Army Research Institute of Environmental Medicine, at Natick, Massachusetts, conducts basic and applied research to determine how exposure to extreme heat, severe cold, high terrestrial altitude, military occupational tasks, physical training, deployment operations, and nutritional factors affect the health and performance of military personnel. Research on the effect of environmental pollutants on military personnel is not part of USARIEM's mission, but is within the purview of the U.S. Army Center for Environmental Health Research at Fort Detrick, Maryland.

== See also ==
- Environmental disease
- Environmental health
- Environmental Toxicology
- Toxicology
- Multiple chemical sensitivity
- Clinical ecology
