= Franklin Bicknell =

British physician and writer

- Born: 20 March 1906; Great Amwell
- Died: 1964 (aged 57–58)
- Occupations: Physician, writer

Franklin Ethrayne Bicknell (20 March 1906 – 1 December 1964) M.D, M.R.C.P was a British physician, nutritionist and writer.

== Biography ==
Bicknell was born at Great Amwell, the son of Ethrayne Adrimar Bicknell, a solicitor, and his wife Ethel Elizabeth Richards, daughter of Franklin Thomas Richards and sister of Grant Richards. He was educated at Marlborough College, and read medicine at New College, Oxford. He qualified as D.M.(Oxon) and M.B.

Bicknell was the consulting physician for the French Hospital, London. He practised medicine at 14 Wimpole Street. In a paper published in 1934 he was a registrar at St Thomas's Hospital. He became a member of the Royal College of Physicians in 1935.

The Nutrition Society of London was formed in 1941. Bicknell is recorded in its Proceedings in 1943 with a comment about vitamins, at 79 Wimpole Street. In 1948 Bicknell became a Fellow of the Hunterian Society. In 1949 he was physician dealing with nutrition at London's Margaret Street Hospital, in the National Health Service and treating mainly tuberculosis patients.

== Nutrition ==
Bicknell argued for more fats and meat in diet. He advocated low-carbohydrate dieting, and wrote the introduction for Eat Fat and Grow Slim (1958) by Richard Mackarness.

By 1961, Bicknell had a reputation. It was said of him that he was "well known for his antagonism to almost anything done by the food manufacturer" and as an opponent of "artificially coloured food such as jams, iced cakes, sweets, ices, canned peas, margarine, custard powder, etc."

=== The Vitamins in Medicine ===
The Vitamins in Medicine was a reference work written by Bicknell and Frederick Prescott, which ran to three editions. The first edition (1942) had 662 pages, the second edition (1946), an "admirable compendium" according to The Lancet's reviewer, went over 900 pages. The British Medical Journal called the 1946 edition a "very fine work". The third British edition appeared in 1953. The 1956 Grune & Stratton (New York) edition was positively reviewed by physician Paul S. Rhoads in AMA Archives of Internal Medicine. There had been a US third edition in 1953 published by the Lee Foundation for Nutritional Research. Bicknell's co-author Frederick Prescott (1904–1989) was director of clinical research at the Wellcome Foundation from 1941 to 1960. He is noted for his self-administration of curare in 1945.

In 1940, both Bicknell and in the United States Israel Spanier Wechsler made announcements that Vitamin E could be used as an effective treatment for amyotrophy. By 1943 the early results in this area were being considered deceptive. In February of that year, in discussion at the Nutrition Society with Hugh Macdonald Sinclair and Thomas Moore (1900–1999), Bicknell resisted the idea that the vitamin E cure had been thrown into question.

=== "Dying England" ===
In May 1947, Bicknell wrote a controversial article "Dying England" in The Medical Press supporting Albert Howard's idea that English people are malnourished. The Medical Press editorial presented it as a response to an article in April of that year in the British Medical Journal, "Rations and nutritional needs", which it called misleading. It was written by Ernest Roy Bransby and Hugh Edward Magee, physicians working in the Ministry of Health. The article was sensationalist and attracted newspaper headlines. The Sun News-Pictorial of Melbourne, Australia mentioned Bicknell in an editorial on 8 May, and the original article was reprinted later that month in the South African Medical Journal. There were also some reservations about the work of Bransby and Magee expressed in the British Medical Journal.

Bicknell stated that "England is dying from starvation" and that the average person was only getting 2,100 calories a day when they needed 3,000. He believed the British population were suffering from prolonged chronic malnutrition. Bicknell ended his polemic with "once we were a great, a prosperous, a happy nation: once we were well fed." John Strachey commented that Bicknell had failed to take into account important factors such as the amount of food consumed in canteens and restaurants.

Lord Woolton, a former Minister of Food, brought up the article in a House of Lords debate on the "Food Situation", on 7 May 1947, and supported Bicknell's view on the need for dietary fat. At the end of the debate, he was rebuked by Lord Addison, who described Bicknell's claim as a "monstrous falsehood". He had checked with the Ministry of Food and contradicted Bicknell's claim that the average person was getting 2,100 calories a day. The actual figure, he stated, was 2,900. Lord Cherwell brought up the issue again on 22 May. The Economist wrote

What emerges from the blast and counterblast of calorie estimates is the existence, concealed under the apparent equality of the rationing scheme, of a new "submerged tenth" in matters of diet. Their plight is not now wholly or even mainly due to poverty, but depends on family circumstance and the accidents of restaurant and canteen convenience.

The Conservatives Lady Grant and James Reid also raised concerns about the national diet. From the scientific side, later in the year, Sir Jack Drummond criticised Bicknell's assertions. Drummond had been Scientific Advisor to the Ministry of Food, from 1939 to 1946, and was a founder of the Nutrition Society. In November, at a formal debate at the Hunterian Society, chaired by Alexander Ernest Roche FRCS, Bicknell and Drummond spoke on "Our Present Diet".

In the aftermath, a defensive attitude towards attacks such as Bicknell's had an impact on a 1949 report on nutrition, after Drummond, Lord Horder and Harriette Chick failed to agree on recommendations of proportions of animal protein and plant protein in diet.

=== The English Complaint (1952) ===
The Vitamins in Medicine had reported a finding from volunteers in vitamin deficiency trials, namely that, independent of the vitamin excluded from diet, the common symptom first reported was tiredness. The English Complaint or Your Fatigue and its Cure (1952) made broad claims about inferior nutrition as implicated in fatigue. The book warned about chemical residues, and broached food safety and antimicrobial resistance topics on which Bicknell expanded later in Chemicals in Food and in Farm Produce.

A House of Lords debate on "Processed Food" in June 1953 saw The English Complaint cited. Lord Hankey drew attention to its mention of agene as a preservative for flour, and generally to its querying of food additives, such as emulsifiers. Lord Douglas of Barloch illustrated Bicknell's advocacy of nutrition facts labelling with an example from Egypt.

=== Food Education Society ===
Bicknell was for a period in the 1950s Chairman of the Food Education Society, at a time when Lord Horder was President. It was originally the National Food Reform Association, set up in 1908 by Eustace Miles. The society's purpose was defined in 1955 as "promoting knowledge in the choice and preparation of food and in the vital relationship between soil fertility, food quality and human health."

In 1960, Bicknell gave up his position as Chairman, and was succeeded by Leslie Harry Hardern (1903–1974). Hardern was a public relations professional, and BBC television broadcaster for the programme "Inventor's Club". The Society was registered as a charitable company in 1962.

=== Chemicals in Food and in Farm Produce (1960) ===
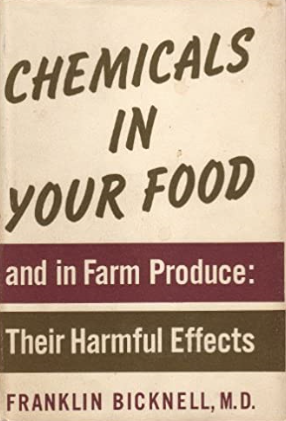
Chemicals in Food and in Farm Produce, 1961 book cover of the US edition

Bicknell in this book argued that birth defects both mental and physical are caused by alien substances added to foods. It was negatively reviewed in the British Journal of Industrial Medicine as scientifically misleading. A review in The Quarterly Review of Biology suggested that "while all will agree that we are against poisons in our foods, this volume contributes little to understanding how difficult it is at times to determine what is a poison."

== Selected publications ==
- The Vitamins in Medicine (with Frederick Prescott, 1946)
- The English Complaint or Your Fatigue and its Cure (1952)
- Introduction Richard Mackarness. Eat Fat and Grow Slim (1958)
- Enuresis or Bed-Wetting (1959)
- Chemicals in Food and in Farm Produce: Their Harmful Effects (1960, 1961)
