= Walter L. Voegtlin =

American gastroenterologist

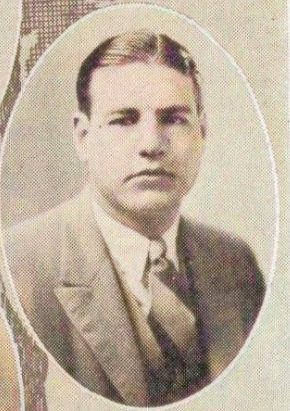
- Voegtlin in 1926
- Born: March 4, 1904; Des Moines, Iowa
- Died: 1975 (aged 70–71)
- Occupations: Gastroenterologist, writer

Walter Lyle Voegtlin (March 4, 1904 – 1975) was an American gastroenterologist and pioneer of the Paleolithic diet.

== Biography ==
Voegtlin was born at Des Moines, Iowa. He was educated at West Des Moines High School and Broadway High School. He studied at the University of Washington (1926–1929) and Northwestern University Medical School (1929–1933). He obtained his BA from Northwestern University in June, 1932. Voegtlin's Master of Science thesis at Northwestern University was titled Evacuation of the Gall Bladder with Cholecystokinin as Studied by Duodenal Drainage. He received his M.D. in 1935.

In the 1930s, Voegtlin and psychiatrist Frederick Lemere at the Shadel Sanatorium (now Schick Shadel Hospital) in Seattle promoted the use of aversion therapy to treat alcoholics. Between 1936–1950 the facility treated over 5000 patients. It has been described as the first successful treatment for alcoholism based on scientific principles. In 1950, Voegtlin and Lemere reported that based on data from 4096 patients over 14 years there was a 60% abstinence at the 1-year point, 51% for two years, 38% for five years, and 23% for 10 years.

== The Stone Age Diet ==
Voegtlin was the first to publish a book The Stone Age Diet, based on the supposed principles of Paleolithic nutrition, in 1975. The book has been cited as pioneering the Paleolithic diet.

Voegtlin argued that humans are predominately carnivorous and should eat an animal-based diet of fat and protein with a minimum of carbohydrates. He stated that humans are anatomically closer to the carnivorous dog than the herbivorous sheep. It was an eccentric book, in which Voegtlin advocated the mass slaughter of dolphins and tigers.

Voegtlin emphasized the importance of meat in the diet with a very low percentage of carbohydrates and no raw vegetables. Voegtlin who promoted an early version of the Paleo diet did not oppose consumption of all dairy products and legumes. In an appendix to the book, Voegtlin promoted a low-carbohydrate diet consisting of meat, eggs, fish, cooked fruits and vegetables, green beans, cheese and sour cream.

== Personal life ==
Voegtlin married his wife Elene in 1932. Elene C. Voegtlin (1907–1962), died age 54.

Voegtlin was in the US Navy and was on board the USS Missouri in Tokyo Bay during the Japanese Instrument of Surrender on September 2, 1945.

He was a medical officer at the hospital on Pearl Harbor. A flag from the USS Arizona was given to Voegtlin by a wounded seaman. Voegtlin gave it to his son Karl F. Voegtlin and it was donated to the Naval Station Everett.

His son Karl F. Voegtlin is also a gastroenterologist.

== Criticisms ==
Food historian Adrienne Rose Johnson has commented that "Paleo leaders today have largely disavowed Voegtlin for his white supremacist, eugenicist, and generally unpalatable politics." Sylvia R. Karasua, a Clinical Professor of Psychiatry has noted that "Voegtlin believed humans were “strictly carnivorous” until 10,000 years ago, something we now know to be patently false."

== Selected publications ==
- Voegtlin, W., & Lemere, F. (1942). The Treatment of Alcohol Addiction: A Review of the Literature. Quarterly Journal of Studies on Alcohol 2: 717-803.
- Voegtlin, W., & Lemere, F. (1950). An Evaluation of the Aversion Treatment of Alcoholism. Quarterly Journal of Studies on Alcohol 11: 199-204.
- The Stone Age Diet: Based on In-Depth Studies of Human Ecology and the Diet of Man (Vantage Press, 1975)

== See also ==
- Richard Mackarness
