= Multiple chemical sensitivity =

Controversial medical diagnosis

Multiple chemical sensitivity (MCS) is an unrecognized and controversial diagnosis characterized by chronic symptoms attributed to exposure to low levels of commonly used chemicals. Symptoms are typically vague and non-specific. They may include fatigue, headaches, nausea, shortness of breath, cognitive difficulties and dizziness.

Recent imaging studies have shown that it is likely a neurological condition.

MCS is a chronic disease that requires ongoing management. In the long term, about half of people with MCS get better and about half continue to be affected, sometimes severely.

== Classification ==
In nosological terms, MCS may be more than one disease.

It is generally considered a subtype of non-allergic chemical intolerance (also called chemical sensitivity).

MCS is considered an acquired disorder, meaning that it was not present from birth but instead developed later.

Compared to other conditions with medically unexplained physical symptoms, such as Myalgic encephalomyelitis/chronic fatigue syndrome, fibromyalgia or Gulf War syndrome, MCS symptoms are only present in response to environmental triggers.

=== Name ===
The name multiple chemical sensitivity has been criticized, partly because MCS is not a sensitivity in the allergic or immunological meaning of that word. Being more sensitive than average to some chemical exposures (e.g., secondhand smoke) is fairly common. MCS is generally used to refer to more significant disability.

The name has also been criticized because it suggests that chemical exposure is the actual cause or etiology, which has not been proven. The word chemical in the name is used loosely and includes natural substances (e.g., the aromas produced by citrus or other fragrant plants). Other names, such as idiopathic environmental intolerance, have been recommended as more accurate alternatives.

=== Definitions ===
Different researchers and proponents use different definitions, which complicates research and can affect diagnosis. For example, the 1987 definition that requires symptoms to begin suddenly after an identifiable, documented exposure to a chemical, but the 1996 definition by the WHO/ICPS says that the cause can be anything, including other medical conditions or psychological factors.

In 1996, an expert panel at WHO/ICPS was set up to examine MCS. The panel accepted the existence of "a disease of unclear pathogenesis", rejected the claim that MCS was caused by chemical exposure, and proposed these three diagnostic requirements for a group of conditions that includes MCS, which they called idiopathic environmental intolerances (IEI):

1. the disease was acquired (not present from birth) and must produce multiple relapsing symptoms;
2. the symptoms must be closely related to "multiple environmental influences, which are well tolerated by the majority of the population"; and
3. it could not be explained by any other medical condition.

In Japan, MCS is called chemical hypersensitivity or chemical intolerance (化学物質過敏症; kagaku bushitsu kabinsho), and the 1999 Japanese definition requires one or more of four major symptoms – headaches; malaise and fatigue; muscle pain; joint pain – combined with laboratory findings and/or some minor symptoms, such as mental effects or skin conditions. The defined lab findings are abnormalities in parasympathetic nerves, cerebral cortical dysfunction diagnosed by SPECT testing, visuospatial abnormalities, abnormalities of eye movement, or a positive provocation test.

Another definition requires a known precipitating event (e.g., an injury or an illness) followed by the appearance of multi-organ symptoms that predictably wax and wane in response to a variety of exposures that do not bother other people. For example, this could describe someone who always feels sick after using ordinary household cleaning products, when exposed to new car smell, or having a live Christmas tree in the house, and then feels better again when not around these things. Additionally, the symptoms cannot be explainable through other conditions that can be identified with ordinary medical tests, such as an allergic reaction.

== Symptoms ==
Symptoms are typically vague and non-specific, such as fatigue or headaches. These symptoms, although they can be disabling, are called non-specific because they are not associated with any single specific medical condition.

Symptoms affect a variety of different organ systems. Different people have different symptoms and different affected systems, but cognitive and neurologic symptoms (e.g., headache and brain fog) are common, as are systemic symptoms (e.g., fatigue). Other people have symptoms affecting the eyes, ears, and nose (e.g., stuffy nose), the respiratory system (e.g., shortness of breath), gastrointestinal system (e.g., nausea), musculoskeletal system (e.g., joint pain), or dermatological system (e.g., itching).

A 2010 review of MCS literature said that the following symptoms, in this order, were the most reported in the condition: headache, fatigue, confusion, depression, shortness of breath, arthralgia, myalgia, nausea, dizziness, memory problems, gastrointestinal symptoms, respiratory symptoms.

Symptoms mainly arise from the autonomic nervous system (such as nausea or dizziness) or have psychiatric or psychological aspects (such as difficulty concentrating).

== Possible causes ==
Various different causes for MCS have been hypothesized, including immunological, toxicological, and neurobiological ideas.

There is a general agreement among most MCS researchers that the cause is not specifically related to sensitivity to chemicals, but this does not preclude the possibility that symptoms are caused by other known or unknown factors. Various health care professionals and government agencies are working on giving those who report the symptoms proper care while searching for a cause.

In 2017, a Canadian government Task Force on Environmental Health said that there had been very little rigorous peer-reviewed research into MCS and almost a complete lack of funding for such research in North America. "Most recently," it said, "some peer-reviewed clinical research has emerged from centres in Italy, Denmark and Japan suggesting that there are fundamental neurobiologic, metabolic, and genetic susceptibility factors that underlie ES/MCS."

The US Occupational Safety and Health Administration (OSHA) says that MCS is highly controversial and that there is insufficient scientific evidence to explain the relationship between any of the suggested causes of MCS – it lists "allergy, dysfunction of the immune system, neurobiological sensitization, and various psychological theories" as the suggested causes – and its symptoms.

=== Immunological ===
Researchers have studied immunity biomarkers in people with MCS to determine whether MCS could be an autoimmune disorder or allergic response, but the results have been inconclusive. Some people with MCS appear to have excess production of inflammatory cytokines, but this phenomenon is not specific to MCS and overall there is no evidence that low-level chemical exposure causes an immune response.

=== Genetic ===
It has been hypothesized that there is a heritable genetic trait which pre-disposes people to be hypersensitive to low-level chemical exposure and so develop MCS. To investigate, researchers compared the genetic makeup of people with MCS, to people without. The results were generally inconclusive and contradictory, thus failing to support the hypothesis.

Gaétan Carrier and colleagues write that the genetic hypothesis appears implausible when the evidence around it is judged by the Bradford Hill criteria.

=== Psychological ===
A 2018 systematic review concluded that the evidence suggests that abnormalities in sensory processing pathways combined with peculiar personality traits best explains this condition.

== Diagnosis ==
In practice, diagnosis relies entirely upon the self-reported claim that the symptoms are triggered by exposure to various substances. Commonly attributed substances include scented products (e.g. perfumes), pesticides, plastics, synthetic fabrics, smoke, petroleum products, and paint fumes.

Many other tests have been promoted by various people over the years, including testing of the immune system, porphyrin metabolism, provocation-neutralization testing, autoantibodies, the Epstein–Barr virus, testing for evidence of exposure to pesticides or heavy metals, and challenges involving exposure to chemicals, foods, or inhalants. None of these tests correlate with MCS symptoms, and none are useful for diagnosing MCS.

The stress and anxiety experienced by people reporting MCS symptoms are significant. Neuropsychological assessments do not find differences between people reporting MCS symptoms and other people in areas such as verbal learning, memory functioning, or psychomotor performance. Neuropsychological tests are sensitive but not specific, and they identify differences that may be caused by unrelated medical, neurological, or neuropsychological conditions.

Another major goal for diagnostic work is to identify and treat any other medical conditions the person may have. People reporting MCS-like symptoms may have other health issues, ranging from common conditions, such as depression or asthma, to less common circumstances, such a documented chemical exposure during a work accident. These other conditions may or may not have any relationship to MCS symptoms, but they should be diagnosed and treated appropriately, whenever the patient history, physical examination, or routine medical tests indicates their presence. The differential diagnosis list includes solvent exposure, occupational asthma, and allergies.

== Management ==
There is no single proven treatment for MCS and no scientific consensus on supportive therapies. The literature generally agrees on the need for MCS patients to avoid the specific substances that trigger reactions for them as well as xenobiotics in general, in order to prevent further sensitization. The goal of treatment is to improve quality of life, with fewer distressing symptoms and the ability to maintain employment and social relationships, rather than to produce a permanent cure.

Some literature recommends a multidisciplinary treatment approach that takes into account the uncommon personality traits often seen in affected individuals and physiological abnormalities in sensory pathways and the limbic system.

Common self-care strategies include avoiding exposure to known triggers and emotional self-care. Healthcare providers can provide useful education on the body's natural ability to eliminate and excrete toxins on its own and support positive self-care efforts. Avoiding triggers, such as by removing smelly cleaning products from the home, can reduce symptoms and increase the person's sense of being able to reclaim a reasonably normal life. However, for other people with MCS, their efforts to avoid suspected triggers will backfire, and instead produce harmful emotional side effects that interfere with the overall goal of reducing distress and disability. Treatments that have not been scientifically validated, such as "elimination or rotary diversified diets", hormone supplement and chemical detoxification through exercise have been used by people with MCS. "Controversial treatment methods offer hope of improvement to many individuals with MCS." Unproven treatments can be expensive, may cause side effects, and may be counterproductive.

Various combinations of different antioxidants together with "detoxifying" measures that are not evidence based are recommended by some authors. "Treatment with a multitude of pills and infusions may lead to "catastrophizing", thus making patients perceive their disorder particularly negatively; this phenomenon is known to have a negative impact on the subsequent disease course ... such treatments place a significant financial strain on patients."

== Epidemiology ==
Prevalence rates for MCS vary according to the diagnostic criteria used. For example, a 2014 study estimated that 0.9% of Canadian males and 3.3% of Canadian females had a diagnosis of MCS by a health professional. A 2018 study found that 6.5% of Australian adults reported having a medical diagnosis of MCS. In Germany, 9% of adults say they have MCS, and 12% of adults in the US say they have been diagnosed. When self-reports are included, about 20% of Australians and 25% of Americans say that they are more sensitive to chemicals than average. As of 2022, the number of people with MCS has either plateaued or is declining.

The condition is reported across industrialized countries. It affects significantly more women than men. A typical age of onset is near middle age. People with MCS are more likely to have high socioeconomic status and to be well educated. They are also more likely to have stressful work situations and a history of subjective health complaints.

For about half of people with MCS, the symptoms could be considered disabling.

=== Related syndromes ===
Symptoms attributed to Gulf War syndrome are similar to those reported for MCS, including headache, fatigue, muscle stiffness, joint pain, inability to concentrate, sleep problems, and gastrointestinal issues. Gulf War veterans are somewhat more likely to have symptoms consistent with MCS.

MCS is also similar to sick building syndrome, with both showing non-specific symptoms such as headaches, respiratory irritation and fatigue. There is also some overlap in symptoms between MCS and myalgic encephalomyelitis/chronic fatigue syndrome (ME/CFS), though chemical exposures are not suspected in ME/CFS.

== Prognosis ==
About half of those with MCS get better over the course of several years, while about half continue to experience distressing or disabling symptoms.

== History ==
MCS was first proposed as a distinct disease by Theron G. Randolph in 1950. In 1965, Randolph founded the Society for Clinical Ecology as an organization to promote his ideas about symptoms reported by his patients. As a consequence of his insistence upon his own, non-standard definition of allergy and his unusual theories about how the immune system and toxins affect people, the ideas he promoted were widely rejected, and clinical ecology emerged as a non-recognized medical specialty.

Since the 1950s, many hypotheses have been advanced for the science surrounding multiple chemical sensitivity.

In the 1990s, an association was noted with chronic fatigue syndrome, fibromyalgia, and Gulf War syndrome.

In 1994, the AMA, American Lung Association, US EPA and the US Consumer Product Safety Commission published a booklet on indoor air pollution that discusses MCS, among other issues. The booklet further states that a pathogenesis of MCS has not been definitively proven, and that symptoms that have been self-diagnosed by a patient as related to MCS could actually be related to allergies or have a psychological basis, and recommends that physicians should counsel patients seeking relief from their symptoms that they may benefit from consultation with specialists in these fields.

In 1995, an Interagency Workgroup on Multiple Chemical Sensitivity was formed under the supervision of the Environmental Health Policy Committee within the United States Department of Health and Human Services to examine the body of research that had been conducted on MCS to that date. The work group included representatives from the Centers for Disease Control and Prevention, United States Environmental Protection Agency, United States Department of Energy, Agency for Toxic Substances and Disease Registry, and the National Institutes of Health. The Predecisional Draft document generated by the workgroup in 1998 recommended additional research in the basic epidemiology of MCS, the performance of case-comparison and challenge studies, and the development of a case definition for MCS. However, the workgroup also concluded that it was unlikely that MCS would receive extensive financial resources from federal agencies because of budgetary constraints and the allocation of funds to other, extensively overlapping syndromes with unknown cause, such as chronic fatigue syndrome, fibromyalgia, and Gulf War syndrome. The Environmental Health Policy Committee is currently inactive, and the workgroup document has not been finalized.

The different understandings of MCS over the years have also resulted in different proposals for names. For example, in 1996 the International Programme on Chemical Safety proposed calling it idiopathic environmental illness, because of their belief that chemical exposure may not the sole cause, while another researcher, whose definition includes people with allergies and acute poisoning, calls it chemical sensitivity.

== Society and culture ==
Memoirs about multiple chemical sensitivity tend to follow a predictable pattern, with a description of various toxins and their effects alongside requests for others to help the writers by changing their behavior (e.g., by not wearing perfume). Frequently the memoirs focus more on things than on people, with interpersonal relationships fading into the background as the writers describe the vigilance they apply to everyday life, such as holding their breath whenever a car drives by, or trying to guess whether nearby people are likely to be smoking or wearing perfumes.

Multiple chemical sensitivity has been featured in the film Safe, a 1995 fictional psychological horror film.

=== International Statistical Classification of Diseases ===
The International Statistical Classification of Diseases and Related Health Problems (ICD), maintained by the World Health Organization, is a medical coding system used for medical billing and statistical purposes – not for deciding whether any person is sick, or whether any collection of symptoms constitutes a single disease. However, this does not mean that people with MCS-related symptoms cannot be treated or billed for medical services.MCS was illegally, without a proper proposal, added to USA ICD10 medical diagnostic code system 2011-2016, then, it was removed. https://icd.codes/icd10cm/F459# The public health service in Germany permits healthcare providers to bill for MCS-related medical services under the ICD-10 code T78.4, which is for idiosyncratic reactions, classified under the heading T78, Unerwünschte Nebenwirkungen, anderenorts nicht klassifiziert ("adverse reactions, not otherwise specified"). Being able to get paid for medical services and collect statistics about unspecified, idiosyncratic reactions does not mean that MCS is recognized as a specific disease or that any particular cause has been defined by the German government. MCS is named in evidence-based ("S3") guidelines for the management of patients with nonspecific, functional symptoms.

== See also ==
- Allergic Contact Dermatitis
- Drug intolerance
- Drug metabolism
- Electromagnetic hypersensitivity
- Environmental health
- Environmental medicine
- Food Intolerance
- Hyperosmia
- Hypersensitivity
- Indoor air quality
- List of questionable diseases
- Mast Cell Activation Syndrome
- Sense of smell#Disorders
- Sensory processing disorder
- Sensory processing sensitivity
- Sick building syndrome
