= Idiopathic environmental intolerance =

Idiopathic environmental intolerances (IEI) are medical syndromes with no proven cause, but which the affected people attribute to various environmental situations. The most common forms are multiple chemical sensitivity, electromagnetic hypersensitivity (electricity), and wind turbine syndrome (noise).

== Commonalities ==
Although the identified environmental factor differs, there are several qualities shared by all of these conditions. All of them are controversial, and none of them result from a scientifically proven pathogenesis and pathophysiology.

There is a wide variety of symptoms, with no pattern associating particular exposures with particular symptoms. Symptoms do not appear consistently after exposure in blinded experiments. However, the expectancy-induced nocebo effect seems to produce symptoms when they believe they have been exposed, even if they have not been exposed to it. That is, people generally do not feel bad when they believe they are safe, but they may learn to fear exposure to a particular substance or situation, if something unrelated but unpleasant happens at the same time.

Evidence indicates that at least part of the distress has a psychological or behavioral component. For example, people with IEIs are often hypervigilant about how their bodies feel. One medical challenge relates to the mind–body problem, with people's experiences being dismissed as "all in their heads" and debates about whether it is a "real" or "physical" condition.

It can be difficult to distinguish IEIs from other somatic symptom disorders and from poorly understood syndromes, such as myalgic encephalomyelitis/chronic fatigue syndrome and fibromyalgia.

== Attributed causes ==
=== Chemicals ===
Multiple chemical sensitivity (MCS) is a chronic condition involving non-specific physical and psychological symptoms that appear when the affected person has been exposed to "chemicals", or at least believes they have been exposed to. Typical triggers include substances with strong or bad odors, such as vehicle exhaust, smoke, or cleaning products. Symptoms often relate to the central nervous system (e.g., difficulty concentrating, feeling lightheaded), musculoskeletal system (e.g., pain), gastrointestinal system (e.g., indigestion), and skin (e.g., rash), but any organ system can be affected. Emotional and mood-related symptoms are common (e.g., feeling anxious after a perceived exposure). They are less likely to attribute their symptoms to psychological factors than healthier people. For example, a healthier person might say that a headache was probably caused by stress, but a person with MCS is more likely to blame an external factor, such as chemicals.

People with MCS frequently have other medical conditions, including somatic symptom disorder, affective disorder, anxiety disorder, and psychotic disorders. They are often neurotic, have high negative affectivity (e.g., feeling anxious), and tend to be absorbed by perceived exposures. They also tend to have very strong concerns about chemicals and pollution.

=== Electromagnetic fields ===
Electromagnetic hypersensitivity (EHS or IEI-EMF) is a chronic condition very similar to MCS, except that the affected person blames electromagnetic fields for their symptoms, rather than chemicals. Typical claims for triggers involve mobile phones and cell sites, cordless telephones, and power lines. Symptoms produced involve sleep disorders, headaches, nervousness, fatigue, and difficulty with concentrating.

People with EHS frequently have other mental disorders, such as major depressive disorder, generalized anxiety disorder, and somatic symptom disorder.

=== Sounds ===
Infrasound hypersensitivity (IHS) is a collection of symptoms that appears when the person has been exposed to low-frequency or infrasound noise, usually from machinery such as a wind turbine. It is sometimes called wind turbine syndrome or vibroacoustic syndrome. The trigger for this is the noise produced, and not, e.g., disliking the visual appearance of wind turbines. Symptoms include ear-related symptoms (e.g., tinnitus), balance problems (e.g., dizziness), problems with concentration and memory, heart palpitations, fatigue, and sleep problems. The psychological symptoms, which can be significant, include feelings of frustration, anger, depression, and anxiety. Feeling annoyed by the presence of wind turbines is correlated with poor sleep.

IHS is not the same as hyperacusis.

== Others ==
Other IEIs include sick building syndrome and some types of food intolerance.
