= Philip R. N. Sutton =

Australian dental researcher (1914–1995)

Philip R. N. Sutton (12 September 1914 – 12 March 1995) was an Australian dental researcher and statistician. Sutton was a leading activist in the opposition of water fluoridation.

Sutton graduated with honors from the University of Melbourne with a degree in Dental Science. His subsequent degrees included Doctor of Dental Science, the highest dental research degree available. His post-graduate studies also included research in physiology, biochemistry and statistics for research workers.

In 1939, Dr Sutton enlisted in the Australian Army. He was part of the medical team in North Borneo. He was elected chairman of the Victorian Branch of the Biometric Society. He was also a Foundation Fellow of the Royal Australian College of Dental Surgeons, and a member of the Council of the Victorian branch of the Australian Dental Association. He did extensive research in the South Pacific, studying tooth abnormalities and related dietary factors. He was appointed Senior Lecturer in Dental Science in 1964.

In 1957, while a senior research fellow in the University of Melbourne in the Department of Oral Medicine and Surgery, Sutton was asked by Sir Arthur Amies, Dean of the Faculty of Dental Science, to check the numerical data and methods published in the American trials on artificial water fluoridation. Sutton's analysis resulted in a 72-page monograph that questioned those studies' findings, and culminated in another publication, Fluoridation: Errors and Omissions in Experimental Trials in 1960 which included the responses of the trials authors' to the original critique and Sutton's comments. Sutton's other publications included studies on the relationship between mental stress and dental disease, the first appearing in the journal, Nature, in 1962. In 1979 he published another critique of water fluoridation studies, Fluoridation 1979: Scientific Criticisms and Fluoride Dangers. His last book, The Greatest Fraud: Fluoridation, was published posthumously in 1996.

== See also ==
- George Waldbott
- Mark Diesendorf
- Brian Martin (social scientist)
