= Mark Diesendorf =

Australian academic and environmentalist

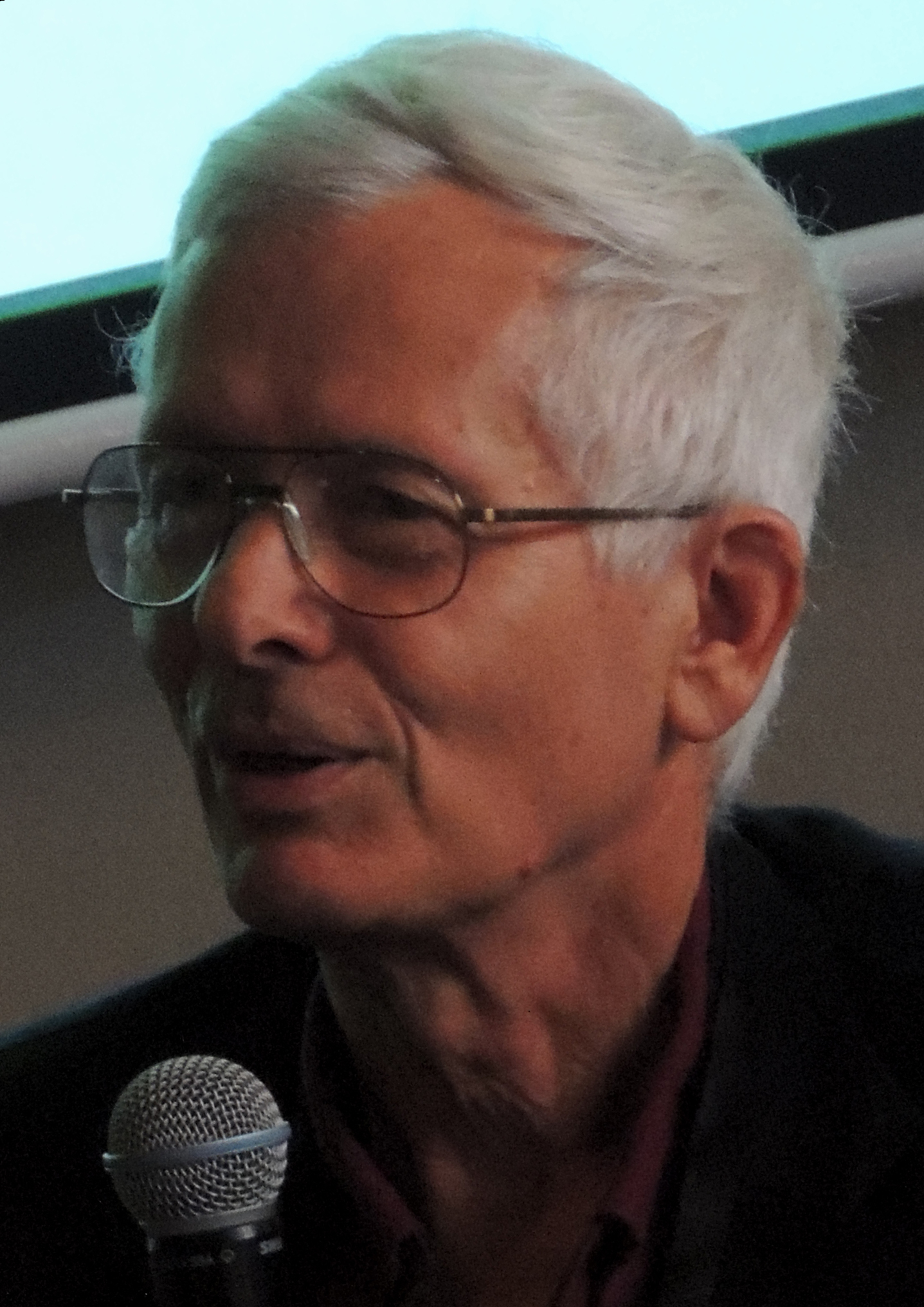
Mark Diesendorf at CARECRC forum, Adelaide (2015)

Mark Diesendorf is an Australian academic and environmentalist, known for his work in sustainable development and renewable energy. He currently researches at the University of New South Wales. He was formerly professor of environmental science and founding director of the Institute for Sustainable Futures at the University of Technology, Sydney and before that a principal research scientist with CSIRO, where he was involved in early research on integrating wind power into electricity grids. His most recent books are The Path to a Sustainable Civilisation (2023) and Sustainable Energy Solutions for Climate Change (2014).

== Biography ==
Diesendorf is the son of the engineer Walter Diesendorf and the poet Margaret Diesendorf. His PhD research was focused on applied mathematics and theoretical physics applied to the solar interior. His early postdoctoral research was diverse, including the analysis of ground and satellite data on VLF emissions, mechanisms of insect olfaction and vision, and biological catalysts. From 1975 to 1985, he worked in the CSIRO Division of Mathematics & Statistics, the Australian national research organisation, on topics such as the integration of wind power into electricity grids. He became a principal research scientist and leader of the Applied Mathematics group in CSIRO. He left CSIRO in 1985 after the organisation had terminated all research on renewable energy. From 1996 to 2001, he was Professor of Environmental Science and Founding Director of the Institute for Sustainable Futures at University of Technology Sydney and then director of a company Sustainability Centre Pty Ltd.

From 2004 to 2016, Diesendorf was a Senior Lecturer and then Associate Professor and Deputy Director of the Institute of Environmental Studies at the University of NSW. In 2015, IES was abolished by the university and Diesendorf retired (nominally) in mid-2016 to become Honorary Associate Professor at UNSW. He continues to teach (as a guest lecturer), research and consult in the interdisciplinary fields of sustainable energy, sustainable urban transport, theory of sustainability, ecological economics, and practical processes by which government, business and other organisations can achieve ecologically sustainable and socially just development.

Based on his belief that science, technology and economics should serve the community at large, Dr Diesendorf has been at various times the Secretary of the Society for Social Responsibility in Science (Australian Capital Territory), President of the Australia New Zealand Society for Ecological Economics, co-founder and Vice-President of the Sustainable Energy Industries Council of Australia, and co-founder and President of the original Australasian Wind Energy Association.

Much of his recent research is on environmental justice. Before that, he researched climate mitigation, especially transitioning electricity supply systems to 100% renewable energy. To this end he was involved with colleagues in the Centre for Energy & Environmental Markets at UNSW in scenario development, computer simulation modelling and energy policy. Previously Dr Diesendorf was one of the leading proponents calling for the ethical, scientific debate over public water fluoridation. On this issue Diesendorf has authored several papers, including a major 1986 article entitled "The mystery of declining tooth decay" in the journal Nature, examining the need for a scientific re-evaluation of fluoridation, and has highlighted some of the contrary evidence.

== Publications ==
=== Books ===
- Diesendorf M & Taylor R 2023. The Path to a Sustainable Civilisation: Technological, socioeconomic and political change. Palgrave Macmillan, Singapore. ISBN 978-981-99-0662-8.
- Diesendorf M 2014. Sustainable Energy Solutions for Climate Change. Routledge-Earthscan and UNSW Press. ISBN 9781742233901. 356+xx pp.
- Diesendorf M 2009. Climate Action: A campaign manual for greenhouse solutions, UNSW Press, Sydney. ISBN 978 1 74223 018 4. 242+xiv pp.
- Diesendorf M 2007. Greenhouse Solutions with Sustainable Energy, UNSW Press, Sydney, ISBN/0868409731.
- Diesendorf M, Hamilton C (eds) 1997. Human Ecology, Human Economy: Ideas for an Ecologically Sustainable Future, Sydney: Allen & Unwin, 378 pp. ISBN 1 86448 288 5. 378+xvi pp.
- Diesendorf M (ed.) 1979. Energy and People-- social implications of different energy futures. Canberra: Society for Social Responsibility in Science.180 pp, ISBN 0 909509 14 X and 0 909509 12 5.
- Diesendorf M, Furnass B (eds) 1977. The Impact of Environment and Lifestyle on Human Health. Canberra: Society for Social Responsibility in Science. 180 pp, ISBN 0 909509 10 7.
- Diesendorf M (ed.) 1976. The Magic Bullet -- social implications and limitations of modern medicine -- an environmental approach. Canberra: Society for Social Responsibility in Science. viii+153pp, ISBN 0 909509 09 3.

=== Selected articles ===
- Diesendorf M; Roser D; Washington H, 2023, 'Analyzing the Nuclear Weapons Proliferation Risk Posed by a Mature Fusion Technology and Economy', Energies 16, http://dx.doi.org/10.3390/en16031123
- Diesendorf M; Hail S, 2022, 'Funding of the Energy Transition by Monetary Sovereign Countries', Energies 15, http://dx.doi.org/10.3390/en15165908
- Diesendorf M, 2022, 'Can energy descent be justified by critiquing 100% renewable energy scenarios? A reply to Floyd et al.', Futures 137, pp. 102907, http://dx.doi.org/10.1016/j.futures.2022.102907
- Diesendorf M, 2022, 'Comment on Seibert, M.K.; Rees, W.E. Through the Eye of a Needle: An Eco-Heterodox Perspective on the Renewable Energy Transition. Energies 2021, 14, 4508', Energies 15, pp. 964, http://dx.doi.org/10.3390/en15030964
- Diesendorf M, 2022, 'Scenarios for mitigating CO2 emissions from energy supply in the absence of CO2 removal', Climate Policy 22, pp. 882 - 896, http://dx.doi.org/10.1080/14693062.2022.2061407
- Diesendorf M, 2022, 'Scenarios for the rapid phase-out of fossil fuels in Australia in the absence of CO2 removal', Australasian Journal of Environmental Management 29, pp. 275 - 283, http://dx.doi.org/10.1080/14486563.2022.2108514
- Diesendorf M; Wiedmann T, 2020, 'Implications of Trends in Energy Return on Energy Invested (EROI) for Transitioning to Renewable Electricity', Ecological Economics 176, pp. 106726, http://dx.doi.org/10.1016/j.ecolecon.2020.106726
- Diesendorf M, 2020, 'COVID-19 and economic recovery in compliance with climate targets', Global Sustainability 3, pp. e36, http://dx.doi.org/10.1017/sus.2020.32
- Diesendorf M, 2019, 'Energy futures for Australia', in Newton P; Prasad D; Sproul A; White S (ed.), Palgrave Macmillan, Singapore, pp. 35 – 51, http://dx.doi.org/10.1007/978-981-13-7940-6
- Diesendorf M, Elliston B 2018. The feasibility of 100% renewable electricity systems: A response to critics. Renewable and Sustainable Energy Reviews 93:318-330.
- Howard BS, Hamilton NE, Diesendorf M, Wiedmann T 2018. Modeling the carbon budget of the Australian electricity sector's transition to renewable energy. Renewable Energy 125:712-728.
- Diesendorf M 2018. Learning from Fukushima: Nuclear Power in East Asia. Energy Research & Social Science 39:162-163.
- Hamilton NE, Howard BS, Diesendorf M, Wiedmann T 2017. Computing life-cycle emissions from transitioning the electricity sector using a discrete numerical approach. Energy 137:314-324.
- Diesendorf M, 2017, 'Ecologically sustainable energy', in Washington H (ed.), CASSE NSW, Sydney, pp. 137–143
- Diesendorf M 2016. Shunning nuclear power but not its waste: assessing the risks of Australia becoming the world's nuclear wasteland. Energy Research & Social Science 19:142-147.
- Mey F, Diesendorf M, MacGill I 2016. Role of local government in facilitating renewable energy and community energy. Energy Research & Social Science 21:33-43.
- Delina L, Diesendorf M 2016. Strengthening the climate action movement: strategies and tactics from contemporary social action. Interface 8(1):117-141.
- Diesendorf M 2016. Subjective judgments in the nuclear energy debate. Conservation Biology 30(3):666-669.
- Wolfram P, Wiedmann T, Diesendorf M 2016. Carbon footprint scenarios for renewable electricity in Australia. J. Cleaner Production 124:236-245.
- Yangka D, Diesendorf M 2016. Modeling the benefits of electric cooking in Bhutan: a long-term perspective. Renewable and Sustainable Energy Reviews, 59:494–503.
- Delina L, Diesendorf M 2015. Strengthening the climate action movement: strategies from histories. Carbon Management 5(4):397-409.
- Elliston B, MacGill I, Diesendorf M. 2014. Comparing least cost scenarios for 100% renewable electricity with low emission fossil fuel scenarios in the Australian National Electricity Market. Renewable Energy 66:196-204.
- Delina L, Diesendorf M 2013. Is wartime mobilisation a suitable policy model for rapid national climate mitigation? Energy Policy 58:371-380.
- Elliston B, MacGill I, Diesendorf, M. 2013. Least cost 100% renewable electricity scenarios in the Australian National Electricity Market. Energy Policy 59:270-282.
- Turner GM, Elliston B, Diesendorf M 2013. Impacts on the biophysical economy and environment of a transition to 100% renewable electricity in Australia. Energy Policy, 54:288-299.
- Elliston B, Diesendorf M, MacGill I 2012. Simulations of scenarios with 100% renewable electricity in the Australian National Electricity Market. Energy Policy 45:606-613.
- Diesendorf M 2011. Scenarios and strategies for climate mitigation. Journal of Australian Political Economy no. 66:98-117.
- Buckman G & Diesendorf M 2010. Design limitations in Australian renewable energy policies. Energy Policy, 38: 3365–76; addendum 38:7539–40.
- Messali E, Diesendorf M 2009. Potential sites for off-shore wind power in Australia. Wind Engineering 33(4): 335-348.
- Mudd GM, Diesendorf M 2008. Sustainability of uranium mining and milling: toward quantifying resources and eco-efficiency. Environmental Science & Technology 42 (7): 2624–2630.
- Saddler H, Diesendorf M, Denniss R 2007. Clean energy scenarios for Australia. Energy Policy 35 (2): 1245–56.

=== Grey literature ===
- Mark Diesendorf & Dennys Angove, 'What is a fair carbon budget for Australia?' RenewEconomy, 21 February 2020.
- Mark Diesendorf & Richard Broinowski, 'A covert push for nuclear weapons?' Australian Outlook, 26 August 2019; reprinted in RenewEconomy and also by Beyond Nuclear International.
- 'Ecological economics: The economics of sustainability', NENA Journal, vol. 1, no. 4, July 2019.
- 'An environmental science perspective on population' NENA Journal, vol. 1, no. 3, June 2019.
- 'New grid needs cooperation', Canberra Times, 1 May 2019.
- 'Fixing the gap between Labor's greenhouse gas goals and their policies', The Conversation, 3/5/2019.
- 'The government's electricity shortlist rightly features pumped hydro (and wrongly includes coal)', The Conversation, 29/3/2019.
- '100% renewable electricity: reliability, economics, impediments & key policies', 100% Renewables Workshop, ANU, 15/2/2019.
- 'Busting myths about renewable energy', Renew Magazine, issue 146, Jan. 2019
- 'Renewable electricity policy for Australia', The Australia Institute, Nov. 2018.
- 'Four key steps to take Australia towards 100% renewable electricity', RenewEconomy, 2018.
- 'Is coal power dispatchable?', RenewEconomy, 22/8/2018.
- Video of seminar, 'Busting myths about renewable energy', 52 min., School of Photovoltaic & Renewable Energy Engineering, 13 Sept. 2018.
- 'Renewable energy breeding can stop Australia blowing the carbon budget -- if we're quick', The Conversation, 16/4/2018.
- 'How rapidly can we transition to 100% renewable electricity?', RenewEconomy 2018.
- 'How South Australia can function reliably while moving to 100% renewable power', The Conversation 2017.
- 'Ecologically sustainable energy', in Washington H (ed.) Positive Steps to a Steady State Economy. Sydney: CASSE NSW, pp. 137–143, 2017.
- Risks, ethics and consent: Australia shouldn't become the world's nuclear wasteland. The Conversation 28 June 2016.
- Rapid transition to clean energy will take massive social change. The Conversation 9 May 2016; reprinted in RenewEconomy
- Renewable energy versus nuclear: dispelling the myths. The Ecologist, 19 April 2016, reprinted in RenewEconomy 22 April 2016.
- Dispelling the nuclear 'baseload' myth: nothing renewables can't do better! The Ecologist, 10 March 2016.
- Coal closures give South Australia the chance to go 100% renewable. The Conversation, 2015, http://theconversation.com/coal-closures-give-south-australia-the-chance-to-go-100-renewable-43182
- Accidents, waste and weapons: nuclear power isn't worth the risks. The Conversation, 2015, https://theconversation.com/accidents-waste-and-weapons-nuclear-power-isnt-worth-the-risks-41522
- Nuclear energy is dirty, unsafe and uneconomic: environmental scientist. New Matilda, 2015, https://web.archive.org/web/20150315062926/https://newmatilda.com/2015/02/21/nuclear-energy-dirty-unsafe-and-uneconomic-environmental-scientist
- Renewing renewables: busting myths about sustainable energy. ABC national radio, Ockham's Razor, 2014, http://www.abc.net.au/radionational/programs/ockhamsrazor/renewing-renewables/5282500
- Renewable energy is ready to go. The Conversation, 2014, http://theconversation.com/renewable-energy-is-ready-to-supply-all-of-australias-electricity-29200
- Corporate efforts to impede renewable energy. Chain Reaction no.121:38-40, July 2014.
- Review of Ian Plimer's book 'Not for Greens'. Crikey, 2014, http://www.crikey.com.au/2014/07/14/get-fact-testing-ian-plimer-on-wind-and-solar-power/
- The value of interdisciplinary research. http://www.science.unsw.edu.au/news/opinion-value-interdisciplinary-research/, 2012, (with Crelis Rammelt)

== See also ==
- Andrew Blakers
- Hugh Saddler
- Philip RN Sutton
- Brian Martin (social scientist)
- Wind power in Australia
- Wind power in South Australia
- Renewable energy commercialisation
- Renewable energy commercialisation in Australia
- International Renewable Energy Agency
- Jim Green (activist)
- Anti-nuclear movement in Australia
- Ian Lowe
- Water fluoridation controversy
- Human Ecology, Human Economy: Ideas for an Ecologically Sustainable Future
