= Grace Perry =

Australian poet, playwright and press editor

- Born: Grace Perry; 26 January 1927; Melbourne, Australia
- Died: 3 July 1987 (aged 60); Berrima, New South Wales
- Occupations: Poet, editor, pediatrician
- Years active: 1962–1987

Dr. Grace Perry AM (26 January 1927 — 3 July 1987) was an Australian poet, playwright, and founder and editor of the South Head Press and Poetry Australia magazine. Her press and magazine provided launching pads for many noted Australian poets such as Bruce Beaver, Les Murray, John Tranter, and John Millett.

She was born in Melbourne and educated in Queensland and Sydney. She graduated in medicine from the University of Sydney in 1951. She split her time between pediatrics and literary affairs as poet, editor, publisher. She was a member of the Australian Society of Authors. She organised poetry workshops and writing schools in Sydney. At Berrima, where she lived in her last years, she ran a 2000-acre property and maintained an interest in stud breeding.

== Editorship ==
Perry controlled her magazine, Poetry Australia, and was committed to publishing diverse styles and subjects. Perry aimed for international significance while maintaining a strong Australian presence. The work of many international writers, including translations, appeared in Poetry Australia. Unusually, most issues did not identify the contributors' nationalities. International contributors included Ezra Pound, Ted Hughes, Seamus Heaney, Louis Simpson, Robert Peters and Margaret Atwood. Translations included early Russian poets (by Rosemary Dobson and David Campbell), Laurence Springarn's translations from Portuguese and Mark Scrivener's translations of German classics. Poetry Australia published special issues of New Zealand, Canadian, Italian, Japanese, Dutch and Flemish, American, Gaelic, French, Austrian, Swedish and Papua New Guinean poetry.

== Perry's published works ==
- Staring at the Stars (1942)
- I Live a Life of Dreams (1943)
- Red Scarf (1963), in two sections: 'Where the Wind Moves' offers love poems in which natural scenery, usually seascapes, is used to reflect personal emotions; and 'Red Scarf', featuring striking verse born out of her medical experiences, expressing the horror and fascination of disease and death.
- Frozen Section (1967), highlights Perry's central concern, the accommodation of the clinician's detachment to the poet's sensitive involvement.
- Two Houses (1969) contains the sequence 'Notes on a Journey', small intense landscape images of the picturesque Warrumbungles and western New South Wales (NSW), and poems of contemporary events such as President Lyndon B. Johnson's Australian visit.
- Black Swans at Berrima (1972), a sequence of individual pieces, begins with the building of the historic magistrate's house at Berrima, describes a journey from Sydney to Berrima, and explores the passing of time and the approach of age and death.
- Berrima Winter (1974)
- Journal of a Surgeon's Wife and Other Poems (1976). The title poem is a long verse diary of the experiences of an immigrant doctor's wife in early colonial Australia. The poem captures the sense of exile that so oppressed the early settlers.
- Snow in Summer (1980)
- Last Bride at Longsleep 1981 is a play, with John Millett.
- German translator Margaret Diesendorf translated some of Perry's poetry for Poetry Australia No. 119 (1989).

== Perry's unpublished works ==
- "Grace Perry aggregated collection of papers". State Library of NSW catalogue.

== Awards and Accolades ==
In 1985, Perry won the NSW Premier's Special Literary Award for services to literature. In 1986, she was awarded the Member of the Order of Australia (AM) for "service to Australian literature, particularly as editor of Poetry Australia". Australia Fund. This fund was instrumental in the establishment in 2002 of the magazine Blue Dog: Australian Poetry, which editor Ron Pretty declared was in "direct line of succession from Poetry Australia". The Grace Perry Memorial Award recognises achievements by Australian poets.
