= Paleolithic diet =

Fad diet based on the presumed diet of Paleolithic humans

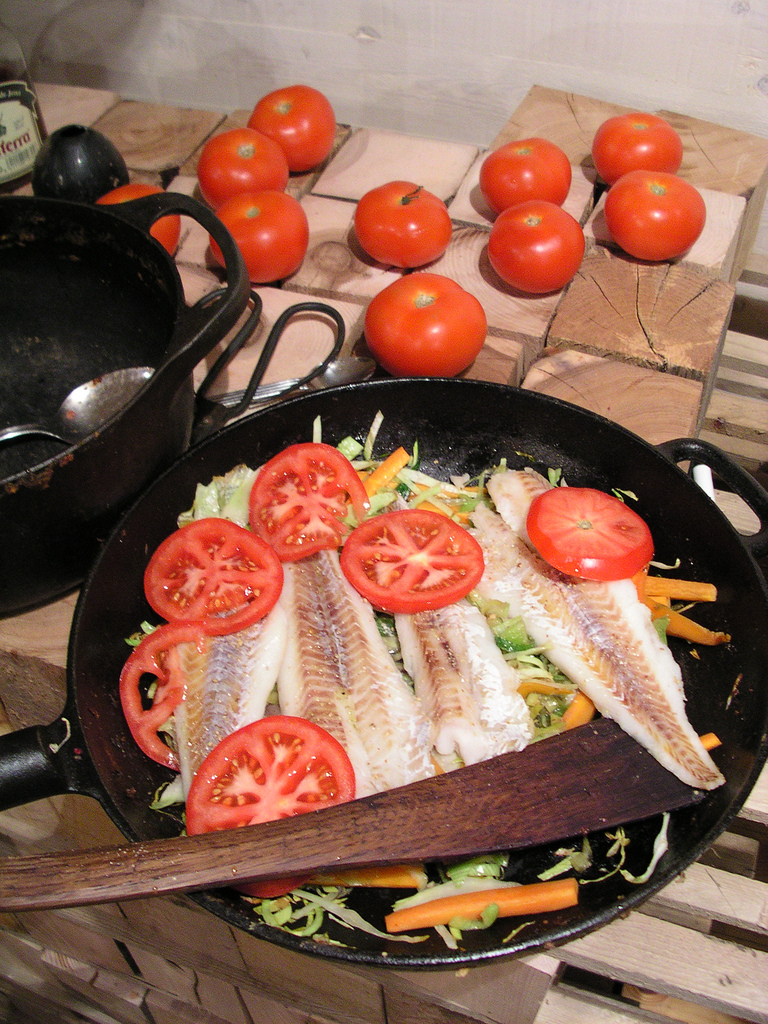
A meal compatible with the Paleolithic diet

The Paleolithic diet, Paleo diet, caveman diet, or Stone Age diet is a modern fad diet consisting of foods thought by its proponents to mirror those eaten by humans during the Paleolithic era.

The diet avoids food processing and typically includes vegetables, fruits, nuts, roots and meat and excludes dairy products, grains, sugar, legumes, processed oils, salt, alcohol, and coffee. Historians can trace the ideas behind the diet to "primitive" diets advocated in the 19th century. In the 1970s, Walter L. Voegtlin popularized a meat-centric "Stone Age" diet; in the 21st century, the best-selling books of Loren Cordain popularized the "Paleo diet". As of 2019 the Paleolithic diet industry was worth approximately US$500 million.

In the 21st century, the sequencing of the human genome and DNA analysis of the remains of anatomically modern humans have found evidence that humans evolved rapidly in response to changing diet. This evidence undermines a core premise of the Paleolithic diet, that human digestion has remained essentially unchanged over time. Paleoanthropological evidence has indicated that prehistoric humans ate plant-heavy diets that regularly included grains and other starchy vegetables, in contrast to the claims made by proponents of the Paleolithic diet.

Advocates promote the Paleolithic diet as a way of improving health. There is some evidence that following it may lead to improvements in body composition and metabolism compared with the typical Western diet or compared with diets recommended by some European nutritional guidelines. However, following the diet can lead to nutritional deficiencies, such as an inadequate calcium intake, and side effects can include weakness, diarrhea, and headaches.

== History and terminology ==
Adrienne Rose Johnson writes that the idea that the primitive diet was superior to current dietary habits dates back to the 1890s with such writers as Emmet Densmore and John Harvey Kellogg, the founder of the eponymous breakfast cereal company. Densmore proclaimed that "bread is the staff of death", while Kellogg supported a diet of starchy and grain-based foods in accord with "the ways and likings of our primitive ancestors". Arnold DeVries advocated an early version of the Paleolithic diet in his 1952 book, Primitive Man and His Food. In 1958, Richard Mackarness authored Eat Fat and Grow Slim, which proposed a low-carbohydrate "Stone Age" diet.

In his 1975 book The Stone Age Diet, gastroenterologist Walter L. Voegtlin advocated a meat-based diet, with low proportions of vegetables and starchy foods, based on his declaration that humans were "exclusively flesh-eaters" until 10,000 years ago.

In 1985 Stanley Boyd Eaton and Melvin Konner published a controversial article in the New England Journal of Medicine proposing that modern humans were biologically very similar to their primitive ancestors and so "genetically programmed" to consume pre-agricultural foods. Eaton and Konner proposed a "discordance hypothesis" by which the mismatch between modern diet and human biology gave rise to lifestyle diseases, such as obesity and diabetes.

The diet started to become popular in the 21st century, where it attracted a largely internet-based following using web sites, forums and social media.

This diet's ideas were further popularized by Loren Cordain, a health scientist with a Ph.D. in physical education, who trademarked the words "The Paleo Diet" and who wrote a 2002 book of that title.

In 2012 the Paleolithic diet was described as being one of the "latest trends" in diets, based on the popularity of diet books about it; in 2013 and 2014 the Paleolithic diet was Google's most searched weight-loss method.

The Paleolithic or Paleo diet is also sometimes referred to as the caveman or Stone Age diet.

== Foodstuffs ==
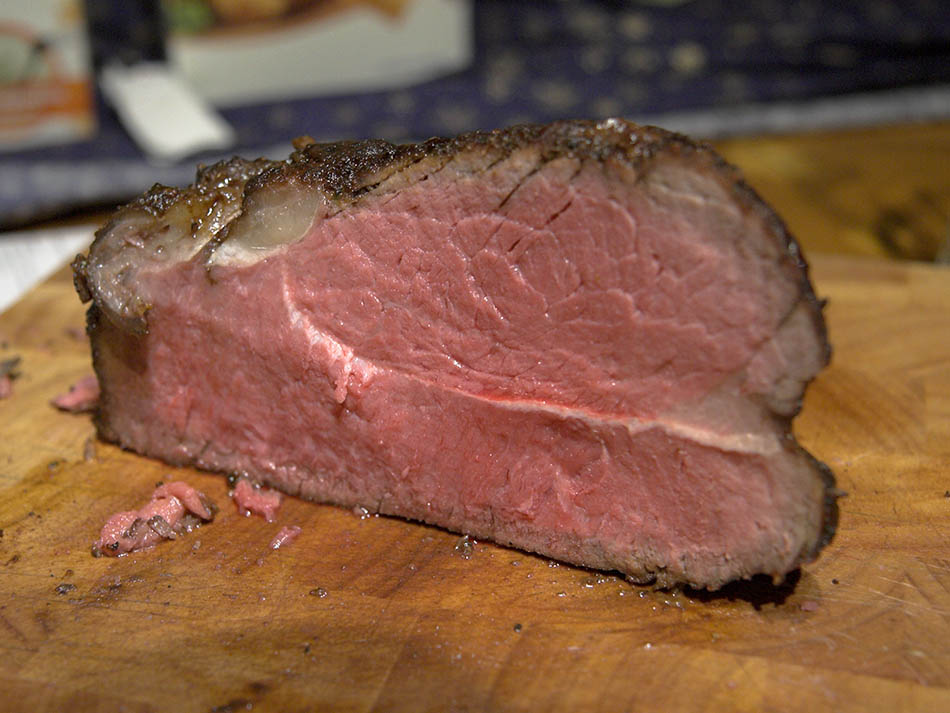
Roast beef. Some recent paleo diet variants emphasize the consumption of unprocessed animal products.

The basis of the diet is a re-imagining of what Paleolithic people ate, and different proponents recommend different diet compositions. Eaton and Konner, for example, wrote a 1988 book The Paleolithic Prescription with Marjorie Shostak, and it described a diet that is 65% plant based. This is not typical of more recently devised paleo diets; Loren Cordain's – probably the most popular – instead emphasizes animal products and avoidance of processed food. Diet advocates concede the modern Paleolithic diet cannot be a faithful recreation of what Paleolithic people ate, and instead aim to "translate" that into a modern context, avoiding such likely historical practices as cannibalism.

Foodstuffs that have been described as permissible include:

- "vegetables, fruits, nuts, roots, meat, and organ meats";
- "vegetables (including root vegetables), fruit (including fruit oils, e.g., olive oil, coconut oil, and palm oil), nuts, fish, meat, and eggs, and it excluded dairy, grain-based foods, legumes, extra sugar, and nutritional products of industry (including refined fats and refined carbohydrates)"; and
- "avoids processed foods, and emphasizes eating vegetables, fruits, nuts and seeds, eggs, and lean meats".

The diet forbids the consumption of all dairy products. This is because milking did not exist until animals were domesticated after the Paleolithic era.

=== Ancestral diet ===
Adopting the Paleolithic diet assumes that modern humans can reproduce the hunter-gatherer diet. Molecular biologist Marion Nestle argues that "knowledge of the relative proportions of animal and plant foods in the diets of early humans is circumstantial, incomplete, and debatable and that there are insufficient data to identify the composition of a genetically determined optimal diet. The evidence related to Paleolithic diets is best interpreted as supporting the idea that diets based largely on plant foods promote health and longevity, at least under conditions of food abundance and physical activity." Ideas about Paleolithic diet and nutrition are at best hypothetical.

The data for Cordain's book came from six contemporary hunter-gatherer groups, mainly living in marginal habitats. One of the studies was on the !Kung, whose diet was recorded for a single month, and one was on the diet of the Inuit. Due to these limitations, the book has been criticized as painting an incomplete picture of the diets of Paleolithic humans. It has been noted that the rationale for the diet does not adequately account for the fact that, due to the pressures of artificial selection, most modern domesticated plants and animals differ drastically from their Paleolithic ancestors; likewise, their nutritional profiles are very different from their ancient counterparts. For example, wild almonds produce potentially fatal levels of cyanide, but this trait has been bred out of domesticated varieties using artificial selection. Many vegetables, such as broccoli, did not exist in the Paleolithic period; broccoli, cabbage, cauliflower, and kale are modern cultivars of the ancient species Brassica oleracea.

Trying to devise an ideal diet by studying contemporary hunter-gatherers is difficult because of the great disparities that exist; for example, the animal-derived calorie percentage ranges from 25% for the Gwi people of southern Africa to 99% for the Alaskan Nunamiut. Descendants of populations with different diets have different genetic adaptations to those diets, such as the ability to digest sugars from starchy foods. Modern hunter-gatherers tend to exercise considerably more than modern office workers, protecting them from heart disease and diabetes, though highly processed modern foods also contribute to diabetes when those populations move into cities.

A 2018 review of the diet of hunter-gatherer populations found that the dietary provisions of the Paleolithic diet had been based on questionable research, and were "difficult to reconcile with more detailed ethnographic and nutritional studies of hunter-gatherer diets".

Researchers have proposed that cooked starches met the energy demands of an increasing brain size, based on variations in the copy number of genes encoding amylase.

== Health effects ==
The methodological quality of research into the Paleolithic diet has been described as "poor to moderate". Some of the paleo diet's proponents have made exaggerated health claims, such as the claim that the diet can reverse diabetes and cure autoimmune diseases, miring the diet in controversy.

Following the Paleolithic diet results in the consumption of fewer processed foods, less sugar, and less salt. Reduced consumption of such is consistent with mainstream advice about diet. Diets reflecting a Paleolithic pattern of nutrition also share some similarities with traditional ethnic diets, such as the Mediterranean diet, which has been found to result in more health benefits than the Western diet. Following the paleolithic diet can lead to nutritional deficiencies, such as those of vitamin D and calcium, which can in turn lead to compromised bone health. The increased fish consumption suggested by the diet can also lead to an elevated risk of exposure to toxins.

There is some evidence that the diet can help in achieving weight loss, due to the increased satiety from the foods typically eaten. One trial of obese postmenopausal women found improvements in weight and fat loss after six months, but the benefits had ceased by 24 months. Side effects among these participants included "weakness, diarrhea, and headaches". As with any other diet regime, the Paleolithic diet leads to weight loss because of overall decreased caloric intake, rather than any specific feature of the diet itself.

There is no good evidence that following a Paleolithic diet reduces the risk of cardiovascular disease or metabolic syndrome, nor is there any evidence that the Paleolithic diet is effective in treating inflammatory bowel disease.

The Paleolithic diet is similar to the Atkins diet, in that it encourages the consumption of large amounts of red meat, especially meats high in saturated fat. Increased consumption of red meat can lead to a higher incidence of cardiovascular disease.

== Proposed rationale and reception ==
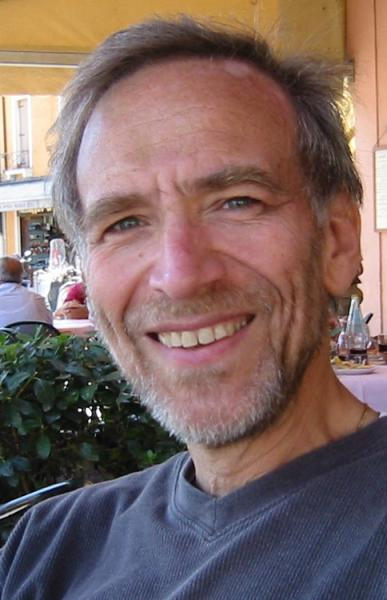
Melvin Konner, co-author of a 1985 paper setting out a hypothetical basis for the Paleolithic diet

The stated rationale for the Paleolithic diet is that human genes today are not different from human genes of 10,000 years ago, and that the diet of that time is therefore the best fit with humans today. Loren Cordain has described the paleo diet as "the one and only diet that ideally fits our genetic makeup".

The argument is that modern humans have not been able to biologically adapt to contemporary circumstances. According to Cordain, before the agricultural revolution, hunter-gatherer diets rarely included grains, and obtaining milk from wild animals would have been "nearly impossible". Advocates of the diet argue that the increase in diseases of affluence after the dawn of agriculture was caused by these changes in diet. Others, however, have countered that it may be that pre-agricultural hunter-gatherers did not suffer from the diseases of affluence because they did not live long enough to develop them.

According to the model from the evolutionary discordance hypothesis, "many chronic diseases and degenerative conditions evident in modern Western populations have arisen because of a mismatch between Stone Age genes and modern lifestyles." Advocates of the modern paleo diet have formed their dietary recommendations based on this hypothesis. They argue that modern humans should follow a diet that is nutritionally closer to that of their Paleolithic ancestors.

The evolutionary discordance is incomplete, since it is based mainly on the genetic understanding of the human diet and a unique model of human ancestral diets, without taking into account the flexibility and variability of the human dietary behaviors over time. Studies of a variety of populations around the world show that humans can live healthily with a wide variety of diets and that humans have evolved to be flexible eaters. Lactase persistence, which confers lactose tolerance into adulthood, is an example of how some humans have adapted to the introduction of dairy into their diet. While the introduction of grains, dairy, and legumes during the Neolithic Revolution may have had some adverse effects on modern humans, if humans had not been nutritionally adaptable, these technological developments would have been dropped.

Since the publication of Eaton and Konner's paper in 1985, analysis of the DNA of primitive human remains has provided evidence that evolving humans were continually adapting to new diets, thus challenging the hypothesis underlying the Paleolithic diet. Evolutionary biologist Marlene Zuk writes that the idea that our genetic makeup today matches that of our ancestors is misconceived, and that in debate Cordain was "taken aback" when told that 10,000 years was "plenty of time" for an evolutionary change in human digestive abilities to have taken place. On this basis Zuk dismisses Cordain's claim that the paleo diet is "the one and only diet that fits our genetic makeup".

Paleoanthropologist Peter Ungar has written that the paleo diet is a "myth", on account both of its invocation of a single suitable diet when in reality humans have always been a "work in progress", and because diet has always been varied because humans were spread widely over the planet.

Anthropological geneticist Anne C. Stone has said that humans have adapted in the last 10,000 years in response to radical changes in diet. In 2016, she was quoted as saying "It drives me crazy when Paleo-diet people say that we've stopped evolving—we haven't."

Melvin Konner has said the challenge to the hypothesis is not greatly significant since the real challenges to human non-adaptation have occurred with the rise of ever-more refined foodstuffs in the last 300 years.

== Environmental impact ==
A 2019 analysis of diets in the United States ranked consumption of a Paleolithic diet as more environmentally harmful than consumption of an omnivorous diet, though not so harmful as a ketogenic diet.

Elizabeth Kolbert has written the Paleolithic diet's emphasis on meat consumption is a "disaster" on account of meat's comparatively high energy production costs.

== Popularity ==
A lifestyle and ideology have developed around the diet. "Paleolithic" products include clothing, smartphone apps, and cookware. Many Paleolithic cookery books have been bestsellers.

As of 2019 the market for products with the word "Paleo" in their name was worth approximately $US500 million, with strong growth prospects despite criticism by the scientific community. Some products were taking advantage of the trend by touting themselves as "paleo-approved" despite having no apparent link to the movement's tenets.

Like many other diets, some proponents promote the Paleolithic diet by an appeal to nature and a narrative of conspiracy theories about how nutritional research, which does not support the supposed benefits of the paleolithic diet, is controlled by a malign food industry. Paleolithic diet advocate John Durant has blamed suppression of the truth about diet in the United States on "the vegetarian lobby".

== See also ==
- List of historical cuisines
- List of diets
- Low-carbohydrate diet
- Modern primitive
- Nutritional genomics
- Paleo Foundation
- Peganism
- Pleistocene human diet
- Raw foodism
