= Margaret A. Ohlson =

American dietitian and writer

- Born: 1901; Chicago
- Died: 5 October 1996 (aged 94–95); Seattle
- Occupations: Dietitian, writer

Margaret Alexander Ohlson (1901 – 5 October 1996) was an American dietitian and writer.

Ohlson was born in Chicago. She obtained her BA in Home Economics from Washington State College and her MS in nutrition and PhD in Clinical Nutrition from the University of Iowa. Ohlson was assistant professor in Home Economics Department at Michigan State College and at Iowa State College for 9 years. She was the head of the Food and Nutrition Department of Michigan State College.

She authored more than 60 research papers on metabolic investigation and nutrition. Ohlson was President of the American Dietetic Association (ADA) during 1951–1952. She was President of the Iowa Dietetic Association, Chairman of the Research Committee and Vice-Chairman of the Food and Nutrition Division of the American Home Economics Association. She was a member of the Food and Nutrition Board of the National Research Council.

In 1950, Ohlson obtained the Borden Award for her research in nutrition and ADA's highest honour, the Marjorie Hulsizer Copher Award in 1966. Ohlson represented the ADA at the first International Congress of Dietetics (ICD) in Amsterdam and served as Chairman (1952–1956). Her expertise in nutrition was recognized across the United States. She was a pioneer of nutrition counseling.

Ohlson died at her residence in Seattle on 5 October 1996.

== Selected publications ==
- Live Lean and Like It (1956)
- Handbook of Experimental and Therapeutic Diets (1962, with Ruth N. Lutz)
