= Marjorie Shostak =

American anthropologist (1945–1996)

- Born: May 11, 1945; United States
- Died: October 6, 1996 (aged 51)
- Education: Brooklyn College
- Known for: Descriptions of the lives of women in hunter-gatherer society
- Spouse: Melvin Konner
- Children: 3
- Scientific career
- Fields: Anthropology
- Institutions: Emory University

Marjorie Shostak (May 11, 1945 – October 6, 1996) was an American anthropologist. Though she never received a formal degree in anthropology, she conducted extensive fieldwork among the !Kung San people of the Kalahari Desert in south-western Africa and was widely known for her descriptions of the lives of women in this hunter-gatherer society.

== Life ==
Shostak was raised in Brooklyn, New York. She received her B.A. in literature from Brooklyn College, where she was a supporter of the women's equal rights movement, and met her future husband, Melvin Konner.

From 1969 to 1971, Shostak and Konner lived among the !Kung San in the Dobe region of southwest Africa, on the border between Botswana and South Africa. There they learned the !Kung language and conducted anthropological fieldwork. While her husband looked at medical issues like nutrition and fertility, Shostak examined the role of women in the !Kung San society, becoming close with one woman in particular, known by the pseudonym "Nisa". Shostak's book on the subject, Nisa: The Life and Words of a !Kung Woman, was first published by Harvard University Press in 1981, and is now a standard work in anthropology. It weaves together the different voices of Shostak and Nisa, alternating between anthropological observation and the life story of a "primitive" woman told in her own words. In the book Shostak argues that !Kung San women had higher status and autonomy than women in Western cultures because of their food contributions.

During the 1980s, Shostak and Konner also wrote a popular book and a number of articles advocating a "Paleolithic diet", which is based on the idea that many illnesses found in agricultural and industrialized societies result at least in part from diets that differ significantly from those that human beings evolved to eat.

Shostak and Konner had three children together. In 1983 they moved to Atlanta, Georgia, when Konner was offered a position as chair of the department of anthropology at Emory University and Shostak became a research associate at the Institute of Liberal Arts. She also taught courses in anthropology on life history methods and the Kalahari.

In 1989, Shostak, following treatment for breast cancer, returned to the Kalahari to interview Nisa again. She died in 1996, aged 51, while her second book, Return to Nisa, was in preparation. It was released posthumously in 2000. In it, Shostak describes a traditional ceremony in Botswana in which Nisa attempted to heal Shostak's cancer. She was survived by her husband, children, parents, and sister.

== Selected works ==
- Shostak, Marjorie (1981). Nisa, the Life and Words of a !Kung Woman. Cambridge, MA: Harvard University Press. ISBN 978-0-674-00432-0.
- Eaton, S. Boyd; Shostak, Marjorie; Konner, Melvin (1988). The Paleolithic Prescription: A Program of Diet & Exercise and a Design for Living. New York: Harper & Row. ISBN 978-0-06-015871-2.
- Eaton, S. Boyd; Shostak, Marjorie; Konner, Melvin (1989). Stone-Age Health Programme. Angus & Robertson Children's. ISBN 978-0-207-16264-0.
- Shostak, Marjorie (2000). Return to Nisa. Cambridge, MA: Harvard University Press. ISBN 978-0-674-00829-8.
