= Theron Randolph =

American physician

Theron Grant Randolph
- Born: July 7, 1906
- Died: September 29, 1995 (aged 89)
- Education: University of Michigan
- Known for: Clinical ecology
- Scientific career
- Fields: Medicine

Theron Grant Randolph (July 7, 1906 – September 29, 1995) was a physician, allergist, and researcher from the United States. He studied food allergies, chemical sensitivities, and preventive care. Randolph, along with some other American allergists, objected to the definition of allergies as arising from serological abnormalities; this definition, common among European allergists of Randolph's day, excluded from consideration the kinds of non-immunological adverse environmental reactions that Randolph studied.

Randolph authored four books and over 300 medical articles and is considered the "Father of Clinical Ecology". According to his obituary in The New York Times, "traditional medical bodies ... which contended there was no scientific basis for his approach, are sharply skeptical of Dr. Randolph's unorthodox therapies". The obituary then goes on to note a, "small but discernible shift in attitude toward the issue of chemical sensitivity. In 1991, a workshop of the National Academy of Sciences agreed on a definition, designating as a syndrome cases in which patients react to chemicals at levels far lower than what is normally tolerated."

== Research area ==
Randolph was an allergologist who graduated from the University of Michigan Medical School, was a research fellow in allergy and immunology at the Harvard Medical School, and then taught at the Northwestern University Medical School until, as he put it, he was forced out because of his unorthodox teaching. He wrote extensively about his clinical research into what has become known as multiple chemical sensitivity (MCS), a controversial condition at that time.

The National Institute of Environmental Health Sciences definition of MCS as a "chronic, recurring disease caused by a person's inability to tolerate an environmental chemical or class of foreign chemicals" is consistent with Dr. Randolph's writings. The general prevalence of MCS in the U.S. is considered to be approximately 15% of the population. However, the 2008 Research Advisory Committee on Gulf War Veterans’ Illnesses confirmed that at least 25% of previously healthy young soldiers suffered from MCS, having become sensitized during their tours of duty. Demonstrating that Theron Randolph was a man before his time, the committee wrote, “It is well established that some people are more vulnerable to adverse effects of certain chemicals than others, due to variability in biological processes that neutralize those chemicals, and clear them from the body.”

== Books ==
Randolph wrote four books and over 300 articles, many of which were about clinical ecology and environmental medicine, two non-recognized medical specialties:

- Moss, Ralph W.; Randolph, Theron G. (1980). An alternative approach to allergies: the new field of clinical ecology unravels the environmental causes of mental and physical ills. New York: Lippincott & Crowell. ISBN 0-690-01998-X.
- Randolph, Theron G. (1987). Environmental medicine: beginnings and bibliographies of clinical ecology. Fort Collins, CO: Clinical Ecology Publications. ISBN 0-943771-00-5.
- Randolph, Theron G. (1962). Human ecology and susceptibility to the chemical environment. Springfield, Ill: Thomas. ISBN 0-398-01548-1.

== See also ==
- Multiple chemical sensitivity
- Clinical ecology
