= Heidi Cullen =

American climatologist

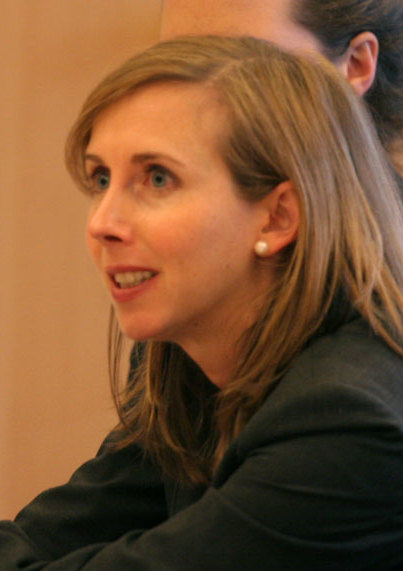
- Born: Staten Island, New York

Academic background
- Education: Columbia University

Academic work
- Institutions: National Center for Atmospheric Research; Climate Central; Princeton University
- Notable works: The Weather of the Future

Heidi Cullen is the Director of Communications and Strategic Initiatives at the Monterey Bay Aquarium Research Institute (MBARI). Her efforts there are focused on inspiring the next generation of ocean explorers, communicating about the ocean’s critical role in our climate system, and advancing the use of autonomous technology to protect ocean health. Cullen was previously the Chief Scientist for the non-profit science communication organization Climate Central, where she was part of the team that incubated and launched the World Weather Attribution initiative. She taught a course in science communication at nearby Princeton University and is the author of The Weather of the Future. A climate scientist and science communicator, she served as The Weather Channel's climate expert from 2003 to 2008 and co-hosted Forecast Earth, the first hour-long television show dedicated to communicating climate change science, impacts, and solutions.

== Life and career ==
Heidi Cullen was born on Staten Island, a borough of New York City, and attended grade school at Blessed Sacrament. She received a B.S. in industrial engineering and operations research from Columbia University, followed by a doctorate in climatology and ocean-atmosphere dynamics from the Lamont–Doherty Earth Observatory, also at Columbia. Her thesis centered on understanding the large-scale drivers of rainfall in the Middle East, including the role of the North Atlantic Oscillation. Interested in paleoclimatology and human history, Cullen collaborated with Harvey Weiss at Yale University to understand if climate was a factor in the collapse of the Akkadian Empire. Her research provided strong paleoclimatic evidence that the Akkadian collapse was coeval in time with a sustained period of widespread drought. Using marine sediment cores from the Persian Gulf, Cullen developed a record of drought for the Holocene that showed a fivefold increase in the mineral dolomite – a paleo proxy for drought – radiocarbon dated at 4025+/-125 calendar yr B.P. The timing of the dolomite increase coincides with when the empire is believed to have collapsed.

After completing her Ph.D., Cullen was awarded a National Oceanic and Atmospheric Administration (NOAA) Climate and Global and Global Change Fellowship and was based at Columbia University’s International Research Institute for Climate and Society. Her post-doc focused on applying seasonal forecasts of El Niño to the hydropower sector in Brazil and Paraguay. In 2001, she accepted a research science appointment at the National Center for Atmospheric Research (NCAR), located in Boulder, Colorado, where she continued to work on applying seasonal climate forecasts and understanding the large-scale climate drivers of drought.

In 2003, Cullen joined The Weather Channel, becoming their first on-air climate expert. She helped educate viewers about climate change and provided a general introduction to climate science. In October 2006, The Weather Channel launched a new 30-minute program, The Climate Code, which Cullen hosted. In April of the following year, The Climate Code would change to an hour format, and be retitled, Forecast Earth; Cullen was part of the creation process of both shows.

Cullen departed The Weather Channel in October 2008 to help launch Climate Central, a non-profit science communication organization based in Princeton, New Jersey. She continued as a contributor to The Weather Channel until November 2008, when NBC, the parent company of The Weather Channel at the time, canceled the program and shuttered the climate division. While at Climate Central, she was part of the team that established the Climate Matters program, which produces free, localized climate science content for weathercasters. In 2013, Climate Central assembled a multi-institutional team of climate scientists with expertise in extreme event attribution to develop and launch an initiative called World Weather Attribution, whose goal is to quantify and communicate the role of climate change in individual extreme weather events (heat waves, droughts, floods) in near real-time. In addition to her responsibilities at Climate Central, she lectured at nearby Princeton University and served as a senior research fellow at the Penn's Wharton Risk Management and Decision Processes Center.

In 2010 she authored the book The Weather of the Future, which reviews the history of climate science and extreme event attribution and ends with a look at future weather forecasts based on climate change scenarios. She also served as Chief Science Advisor for the Emmy-award-winning Showtime series, The Years of Living Dangerously.

Since 2018, Cullen has focused her efforts on raising awareness of the ocean and the important climate services it provides. She is part of the SOCCOM project and GO-BGC initiative to deploy autonomous biogeochemical-sensing floats and is a champion for building an ocean health and carbon observatory.

== Boards, Awards, and Selected Media ==
- Oct. 11, 2019: Ocean Overlooked When it Comes to Climate Change, San Francisco Chronicle, op-ed
- June 22, 2019: What’s Killing Pacific Whales?, New York Times, op-ed contributor
- 2019 - Friend of the Planet Award - National Center for Science Education.
- 2017 - Rachel Carson Award - Audubon Society
- June 25, 2017: Most people don't see how climate change is affecting their lives–and that's a problem: Heidi Cullen is the blame changer
- August 20, 2016: Think It’s Hot Now? Just Wait, New York Times, op-ed contributor
- March 25, 2016: What Weather is the Fault of Climate Change?, New York Times, op-ed contributor
- May 25, 2014: Face The Nation to discuss IPCC report
- May 31, 2012: Clouded Forecast, New York Times, op-ed contributor
- Aug. 25, 2010: The Colbert Report on Comedy Central to discuss The Weather of the Future
- 2008 - National Conservationist Award for Science - National Wildlife Federation
- Associate Editor - Weather, Climate, Society
- American Geophysical Union - member
- American Meteorological Society - member
- Society of Environmental Journalists - member
- NOAA Science Advisory Board

== See also ==
- Scientific opinion on climate change

== Selected publications ==
- Maibach, Edward; Cullen, Heidi; Placky, Bernadette; Witte, Joe; Gandy, Jim (August 2022). "Improving public understanding of climate change by supporting weathercasters". Nature Climate Change. 12 (8): 694–695. Bibcode:2022NatCC..12..694M. doi:10.1038/s41558-022-01433-2.
- van der Wiel, Karin; Kapnick, Sarah; van Oldenborgh, Geert Jan; Whan, Kirien; Phillip, Sjoukje; Vecchi, Gabriel; Arrighi, Julie; Singh, Roop; Cullen, Heidi (February 2017). "Rapid attribution of August 2016 flood inducing extreme precipitation in south Louisiana to climate change". Hydrology and Earth System Sciences. 21 (2): 897–921. Bibcode:2017HESS...21..897V. doi:10.5194/hess-21-897-2017.
- Barlow, Mathew; Wheeler, Matthew; Lyons, Bradfield; Cullen, Heidi (December 2005). "Modulation of Daily Precipitation over Southwest Asia by the Madden-Julian Oscillation". Monthly Weather Review. 133 (12): 3579–94. Bibcode:2005MWRv..133.3579B. doi:10.1175/MWR3026.1.
- Glantz, Michael H.; Cullen, Heidi (2003). "Zimbabwe's Food Crisis". Environment: Science and Policy for Sustainable Development. 45 (1): 9–11. doi:10.1080/00139150309604518. S2CID 154460444.
- Barlow, Mathew; Cullen; Lyons, Bradfield (April 2002). "Drought in Central and Southwest Asia: La Nina, the warm pool, and Indian Ocean precipitation". Journal of Climate. 15 (7): 697–700. Bibcode:2002JCli...15..697B. doi:10.1175/1520-0442(2002)015<0697:DICASA>2.0.CO;2. S2CID 55834642.
- Visbeck, M.; Hurrell; Polvani, L.; Cullen, Heidi (6 November 2001). "The North Atlantic Oscillation: Past, present, and future". Proceedings of the National Academy of Sciences of the United States of America. 98 (23): 12876–7. Bibcode:2001PNAS...9812876V. doi:10.1073/pnas.231391598. PMC 60791. PMID 11687629.
- Cullen, Heidi; deMenocal, Peter B. (30 June 2000). "North Atlantic Influence on Tigris-Euphrates Streamflow". International Journal of Climatology. 20 (8): 853–863. Bibcode:2000IJCli..20..853C. doi:10.1002/1097-0088(20000630)20:8<853::AID-JOC497>3.0.CO;2-M.
- Cullen, Heidi; deMenocal, Peter B.; Hemming, S.; Hemming, G. (April 2000). "The Possible Role of Climate in the collapse of the Akkadian Empire: evidence from the deep sea". Geology. 28 (4): 379–382. Bibcode:2000Geo....28..379C. doi:10.1130/0091-7613(2000)28<379:CCATCO>2.0.CO;2.
- Cullen, Heidi; D’Arrigo, Roseanne; Cook, Edward; Cook, Edward (February 2001). "Multiproxy reconstructions of the North Atlantic Oscillation". Paleoceanography. 16 (1): 27–39. Bibcode:2001PalOc..16...27C. doi:10.1029/1999PA000434. S2CID 17419180.
- Visbeck, Martin; Cullen, Heidi; Krahmann, Gerd; Naik, Naomi (15 December 1998). "An ocean model's response to North Atlantic Oscillation-like wind forcing" (PDF). Geophysical Research Letters. 25 (24): 4521–5. Bibcode:1998GeoRL..25.4521V. doi:10.1029/1998GL900162. S2CID 14258796.
- Bond, Gerard; Showers, William; Maziet, Cheseby; Lotti, Rusty; Almasi, Peter; deMenocal, Peter; Priore, Paul; Cullen, Heidi; Hajdas, Irka; Georges, Bonani (14 November 1997). "A pervasive millennial-scale cycle in North Atlantic Holocene and glacial climates". Science. 278 (5341): 1257–66. Bibcode:1997Sci...278.1257B. doi:10.1126/science.278.5341.1257. S2CID 28963043.
- What Weather Is the Fault of Climate Change? March 11, 2016 New York Times
