= Tim Flannery =

Australian scientist and global warming activist

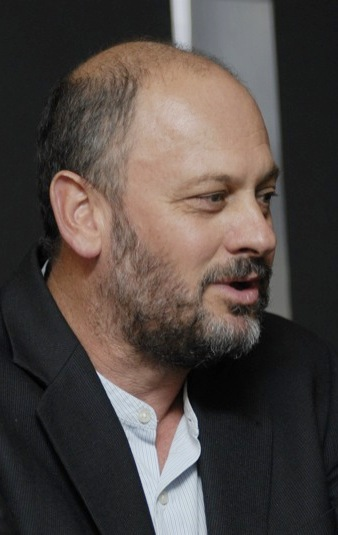
- Tim Flannery at the 5th World Conference of Science Journalists, 2007
- Born: Timothy Fridtjof Flannery; 28 January 1956 (age 70); Melbourne, Victoria, Australia
- Education: La Trobe University, Monash University, University of New South Wales
- Occupations: Palaeontologist; Mammalogist; Science communicator; Author; Environmentalist; Climate change activist
- Organisation(s): Climate Council; University of Melbourne; Graduate Institute of International and Development Studies
- Known for: Writing and speaking about climate change
- Notable work: The Future Eaters; The Weather Makers
- Spouses: Paula Kendall, Alexandra Szalay
- Children: 3
- Awards: Australian of the Year (2007); Full list

Timothy Fridtjof Flannery FAA (born 28 January 1956) is an Australian mammalogist, palaeontologist, environmentalist, conservationist, explorer, author, science communicator, activist, and public scientist. He is especially known for his 1994 book The Future Eaters, on the natural history of Australia, which was adapted for television in 2006, and his 2006 book The Weather Makers, about the effects of climate change in Australia.

As a researcher, Flannery had roles at several universities and museums in Australia, specialising in fossil marsupials and mammal evolution. He made notable contributions to the palaeontology of Australia and New Guinea during the 1980s, including reviewing the evolution and fossil records of Phalangeridae and Macropodidae. While mammal curator at the Australian Museum, he undertook a survey of the mammals of Melanesia, where he identified 17 previously undescribed species. He has published widely on the systematics, zoogeography, and biochronology of the mammals of Australia and New Guinea.

He has since written many more books on natural history and environmental topics, including Throwim Way Leg and Chasing Kangaroos, and has appeared on television and in the media. He was awarded Australian of the Year in 2007 for his work and advocacy on environmental issues.

Flannery became prominent for his role in communication, research and advocacy around the issue, particularly in his native Australia. In 2011, he was appointed the Chief Commissioner of the Climate Commission, a federal government body providing information on climate change to the Australian public, until its abolition by the Abbott government in 2013. Flannery and other sacked commissioners later formed the independent Climate Council, which continues to communicate independent climate science to the Australian public. An environmentalist and conservationist, Flannery is a supporter of climate change mitigation, renewable energy transition, phasing out coal power, and rewilding.

== Early life and education ==
Timothy Fridtjof Flannery was born on 28 January 1956 in Melbourne, Victoria. He was raised in a Catholic family along with his two sisters in the Melbourne suburb of Sandringham, close to Port Phillip Bay. He described himself as a "solitary" child, spending time looking for fossils and learning to fish and scuba dive. He said he first became aware of marine pollution and its effects on living organisms during this period. He attended Catholic school, and later said that he did not enjoy it and became an atheist. He was expelled in year 12 for suggesting a prominent abortion activist be invited to speak to counter the anti-abortionist views at the school, but was later allowed to return after an intervention from his father.

After failing to achieve the required school marks to study science, Flannery first studied English literature at La Trobe University, graduating in 1977 with a Bachelor of Arts. After being impressed by Flannery's knowledge of natural history, palaeontologist Tom Rich and his wife encouraged him to pursue the subject. After doing some postgraduate studies in geology, while tutoring at the School of Earth Sciences at Monash University, he changed focus to zoology and palaeontology, earning a Master of Science (MSc) from Monash in 1981.

In 1984 or 1985, after also tutoring in zoology at the School of Biological Sciences at the University of New South Wales for three years, he earned his PhD from UNSW Sydney.

He then left Melbourne for Sydney, enjoying its subtropical climate and species diversity. In 1984, Flannery earned a PhD at the University of New South Wales in Palaeontology for his work on the evolution and fossils of macropods under palaeontologist Mike Archer.

== Academic career ==
In 1984 Flannery was appointed principal research scientist and head of the Department of Mammalogy at the Australian Museum. He then undertook his first trips to Papua New Guinea, the Solomon Islands and elsewhere, later becoming mammal curator at the museum. He took 15 trips in total to New Guinea (both Papua New Guinea and Irian Jaya) starting in 1981 and into the 1990s, working closely with local tribes to undertake fieldwork, which he later recounted in Throwin Way Leg (1998). A tapeworm he sent to a parasitologist following one trip was revealed to be a new species, and was later named Burtiela flanneryi after him. During this time he also worked to save the bandicoot population on North Head.

From 1997 until 2001 he was also conjoint professor in Faculty of Science and Mathematics at the University of Newcastle, NSW. In 1998 to 1999 he was a visiting professor of Organismic and Evolutionary Biology, as well as chair of Australian studies at Harvard University. He left the post at the Australian Museum in 1999.

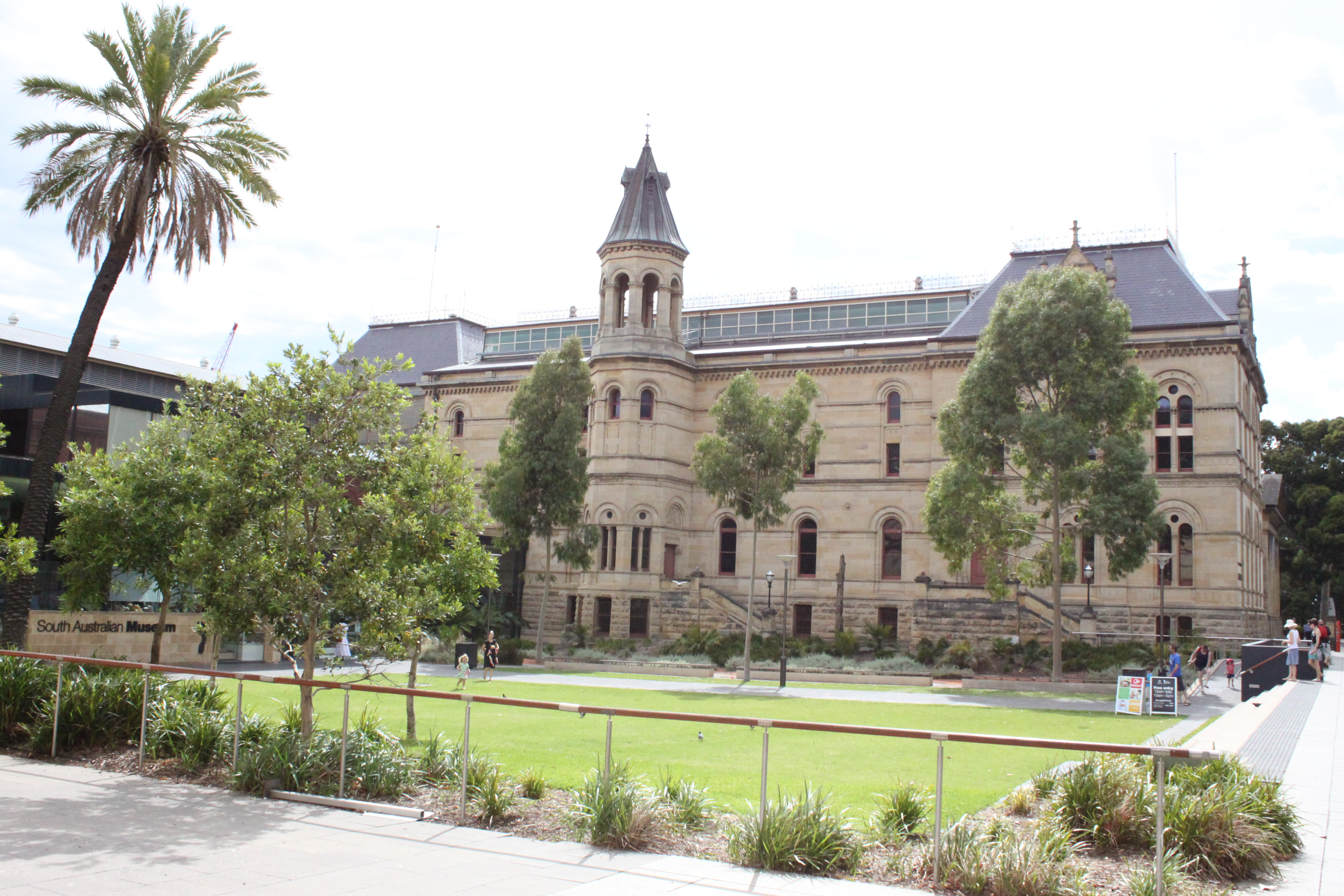
Flannery was director of South Australian Museum for 7 years.

From 1999 until 2006 he was a professor at the University of Adelaide, at the same time serving as director of the South Australian Museum in Adelaide, South Australia.

In 2007, Flannery became professor in the Climate Risk Concentration of Research Excellence at Macquarie University. He held the Panasonic Chair in Environmental Sustainability. He left Macquarie University in mid-2013. He has contributed to over 143 scientific papers.

As of November 2024 Flannery is a professor at the Melbourne Sustainable Society Institute at the University of Melbourne.

In 2021 he was a visiting lecturer at the Graduate Institute of International and Development Studies in Geneva, Switzerland, as the Fondation Segré Distinguished Visiting Professor.

== Scientific contributions ==
=== Palaeontology ===
In 1980, Flannery discovered an Allosaurid dinosaur fossil on the southern coast of Victoria, the first from the family known from Australia. In 1985, he had a role in the ground-breaking discovery of Cretaceous fossil monotreme Steropodon, the first Mesozoic mammal fossil discovered in Australia. This find extended the Australian mammal fossil record back 80 million years. During the 1980s, Flannery described most of the known Pleistocene megafaunal species in New Guinea as well as the fossil record of the phalangerids, a family of possums. As part of his doctoral studies, he reviewed the evolution of Macropodidae and described 29 new fossil species, including 11 new genera and three new subfamilies.

=== Mammalogy ===
Through the 1990s, Flannery surveyed the mammals of Melanesia—identifying more than 30 species—and took a leading role in conservation efforts in the region. He also identified at least 17 previously undescribed species during his 15 trips, includes the Dingiso, Sir David's long-beaked echidna, and the Telefomin cuscus. and several tree kangaroos. He also found living specimens of the Bulmer's fruit bat, which were previously thought extinct. In the 1990s, Flannery published The Mammals of New Guinea (Cornell Press) and Prehistoric Mammals of Australia and New Guinea (Johns Hopkins Press), the most comprehensive reference works on the subjects.

The specific name of the greater monkey-faced bat (Pteralopex flanneryi), described in 2005, honours Flannery.

Flannery's work prompted Sir David Attenborough to describe him as being "in the league of the all-time great explorers like Dr David Livingstone".

In 2022, Flannery was a co-author on new research on the origins of monotremes.

== Climate change communication ==
In the 1990s, Flannery observed a change in the elevational range of trees while doing fieldwork in New Guinea, and realised it was likely to be a climate change impact. He subsequently began working on climate change more seriously and shifted to campaigning and publicly communicating about climate change from the 2000s.

Flannery's prominence in raising awareness around the subject, and efforts to oppose climate change denial, have occasionally attracted hostility from the media. Some of Flannery's academic peers were also initially critical of Flannery for speaking outside of his primary area of expertise. When discussing this in 2009, Flannery said that climate change science was a less established field earlier in his career and experts from multiple fields had shifted to respond to the issue, and said he feels publicly funded scientists are obliged to communicate their work and be vocal on important issues. In 2015, the Jack P. Blaney Award for Dialogue recognised Flannery for using dialogue and authentic engagement to build global consensus for action around climate change. As of 2021, he had attended six United Nations Climate Change conferences in official government roles and as an observer.

In 2002, Flannery was appointed as chair of South Australia's Environmental Sustainability Board and was an advisor on climate change to South Australian Premier Mike Rann. He was a member of the Queensland Climate Change Council established by the Queensland Minister for Sustainability, Climate Change and Innovation Andrew McNamara.

He was chairman of the Copenhagen Climate Council, an international group of business and other leaders that coordinated a business response to climate change and assisted the Danish government in the lead up to COP15.

Flannery has frequently discussed the effects of climate change, particularly on Australia, and advocated for its mitigation. During the devastating Black Summer bushfires of 2019–20, Flannery frequently appeared in the media to discuss the links between climate change and the unprecedented bushfires, stating, "I am absolutely certain that [the bushfires are] climate change caused."

=== Climate Commission ===
In February 2011, it was announced that Flannery had been appointed to head the Climate Commission established by Prime Minister Julia Gillard to explain climate change and the need for a carbon price to the public. The commission was a panel of leading scientists and business experts whose mandate was to provide an "independent and reliable" source of information for all Australians.

Following the election of the Abbott government in the 2013 Australian federal election, on 19 September 2013 Flannery was sacked from his position as head of the Climate Commission in a phone call from new Federal Environment Minister Greg Hunt. "It was a short and courteous conversation," Flannery recalls. "I'm pretty sure that cabinet hadn't been convened when they did it. My very strong recollection is that it was [the Abbott Government's] very first act in government... The website that we'd spent a lot of time building was taken down with absolutely no justification as far as I could see. It was giving basic information that was being used by many, many people—teachers and others—just to gain a better understanding of what climate science was actually about." It was also announced that the commission would be dismantled and its remit handled by the Department of Environment.

=== Climate Council ===
By 6 October 2013, Flannery and the other commissioners had launched a new body called the Climate Council. Flannery told ABC News that the organisation stated that it had the same goals as the former Climate Commission, to provide independent information on the science of climate change. Amanda McKenzie was appointed as CEO. Between 24 September and 6 October the new Climate Council had raised $1 million in funding from a public appeal, sufficient to keep the organisation operating for 12 months. The Climate Council continues to exist based on donations from the general public.

== Publications ==
=== The Future Eaters ===
In 1994, Flannery published The Future Eaters: An Ecological History of the Australasian Lands and People, which became a bestseller. The synopsis of the work regards three waves of human migration in these regions. These waves of people Flannery describes as "future eaters". The first wave was the migration to Australia and New Guinea from Southeast Asia approximately 40,000 to 60,000 years ago. The second was Polynesian migration to New Zealand and surrounding islands 800 to 3,500 years ago. The third and final wave Flannery describes is European colonisation at the end of the 18th century.

Flannery describes the evolution of the first wave of future-eaters:

Sixty thousand or more years ago human technology was developing at what we would consider to be an imperceptible pace. Yet it was fast enough to give the first Australasians complete mastery over the 'new lands'. Freed from the ecological constraints of their homeland and armed with weapons honed in the relentless arms race of Eurasia, the colonisers of the 'new lands' were poised to become the world's first future eaters.

In contrast with other hypotheses that climate variability and change had shaped the evolutionary history of Australia, he instead attributed the continent's nutrient-poor soil as a driver. He also proposed that Aboriginal Australians had shaped the continent's ecosystems through their fire-stick farming and unique practices. It also advocates for modern societies of the Australasian region adapt to its unique ecological conditions, including managing the environment, consuming local rather than imported species, and limiting human population growth.

The Future Eaters enjoyed strong sales and critical acclaim. Redmond O'Hanlon, a Times Literary Supplement correspondent said that "Flannery tells his beautiful story in plain language, science popularising at its antipodean best". Fellow activist David Suzuki praised Flannery's "powerful insight into our current destructive path". Some experts disagreed with Flannery's thesis, however, concerned that his broad-based approach, ranging across multiple disciplines, ignored counter-evidence and was overly simplistic.

The Future Eaters was adapted into a documentary series for ABC Television.

=== The Weather Makers ===
While reading scientific journals more widely during his tenure at South Australian Museum, Flannery became increasingly alarmed by anthropogenic climate change. He spent five years writing a book on the topic. This culminated in The Weather Makers: The History & Future Impact of Climate Change published in 2005, in which he outlined the science behind climate change for a general audience. "With great scientific advances being made every month, this book is necessarily incomplete," Flannery writes, but "That should not, however, be used as an excuse for inaction. We know enough to act wisely."

The book broadly discussed longer-term patterns of climatic change and its influence on evolution. It also discussed contemporary greenhouse gas emissions and effects of climate change, such as sea level rise, impacts on large storms and species extinction. Flannery also provided guidance on mitigation, such as reducing emissions and increasing solar and wind power. Other points include:

- that a failure to act on climate change may eventually force the creation of a global carbon dictatorship, which he calls the "Earth Commission for Thermostatic Control", to regulate carbon use across all industries and nations—a level of governmental intrusion that Flannery describes as "very undesirable"; and
- the establishment of "Geothermia"—a new city at the NSW-South Australia-Queensland border—to take advantage of the location's abundance of natural gas reserves, geothermal and solar energy. Flannery argues that such a city could be completely energy self-sufficient, and would be a model for future city development worldwide. Of the city project, Flannery told The Bulletin that "I know it's radical but we have no choice".

The book won international acclaim. Bill Bryson concluded that "It would be hard to imagine a better or more important book." The Weather Makers was honoured in 2006 as 'Book of the Year' at the New South Wales Premier's Literary Awards. James Hansen reviewed the book positively. Released not long before An Inconvenient Truth, the book came at a time when climate change was becoming more prominent topic in public opinion and increased Flannery's profile. A review in NPR outlined how Flannery had sought to settle debate and controversy about climate change that was prominent at the time.

=== Other works ===
Flannery has published many other books. He recounted his scientific fieldwork and experiences with local tribal people in New Guinea in Throwim Way Leg (1999). He later released an account of his work in Australia in Chasing Kangaroos (2007).

In 2010's Here on Earth, Flannery criticises elements of Darwinism while endorsing James Lovelock's Gaia hypothesis. In 2015, Flannery published Atmosphere of Hope, which discussed climate change mitigation, carbon sequestration and technological solutions and acts as a follow-up to The Weather Makers. He published another work about climate change in 2020, The Climate Cure, which calls for the Australian government to address the issue and argues its response to the COVID-19 pandemic could be used as a model for this.

Following The Future Eaters on Australasia, he has published popular science books recounting the natural histories of North America in The Eternal Frontier (2001) and Europe in Europe: A Natural History (2018).

== Television and film ==
Flannery has appeared in several series for ABC Television, including several travel documentary collaborations with comedian John Doyle. Two Men In A Tinnie focused on the pair travelling down the Murray River, and Two in the Top End in the Kimberley.

In August 2017 Flannery hosted an episode of ABC Catalyst investigating how carefully managed seaweed growth could contribute to combating climate change via the sequestration of atmospheric carbon to the ocean floor. This explored the details of the book he published in July 2017, Sunlight and Seaweed: An Argument for How to Feed, Power and Clean Up the World. In January 2018, Flannery appeared on the ABC's Science program exploring whether humans are becoming a new 'Mass Extinction Event', in addition to outlining the '5 Things You Need to Know About Climate Change'. Flannery also appeared in the 2021 documentary film Burning, about the Black Summer bushfires.

== Views and advocacy ==
I've always attracted a lot of negative publicity. One of the things I do, I think, is challenge the status quo – whether it be climate change, or interpreting Australia's past. And the status quo is there for a good reason: a lot of people benefit from it, and in challenging it, you inevitably make enemies.

— Tim Flannery

Flannery's work in raising the profile of environmental issues was key to his being named Australian of the Year in 2007. Awarding the prize, then Prime Minister John Howard said that the scientist "has encouraged Australians into new ways of thinking about our environmental history and future ecological challenges." That said, Howard, a climate denier, was unconvinced as to some of Flannery's views.

=== Climate change ===
Flannery has long spoken out about the impacts of climate change in Australia and internationally.

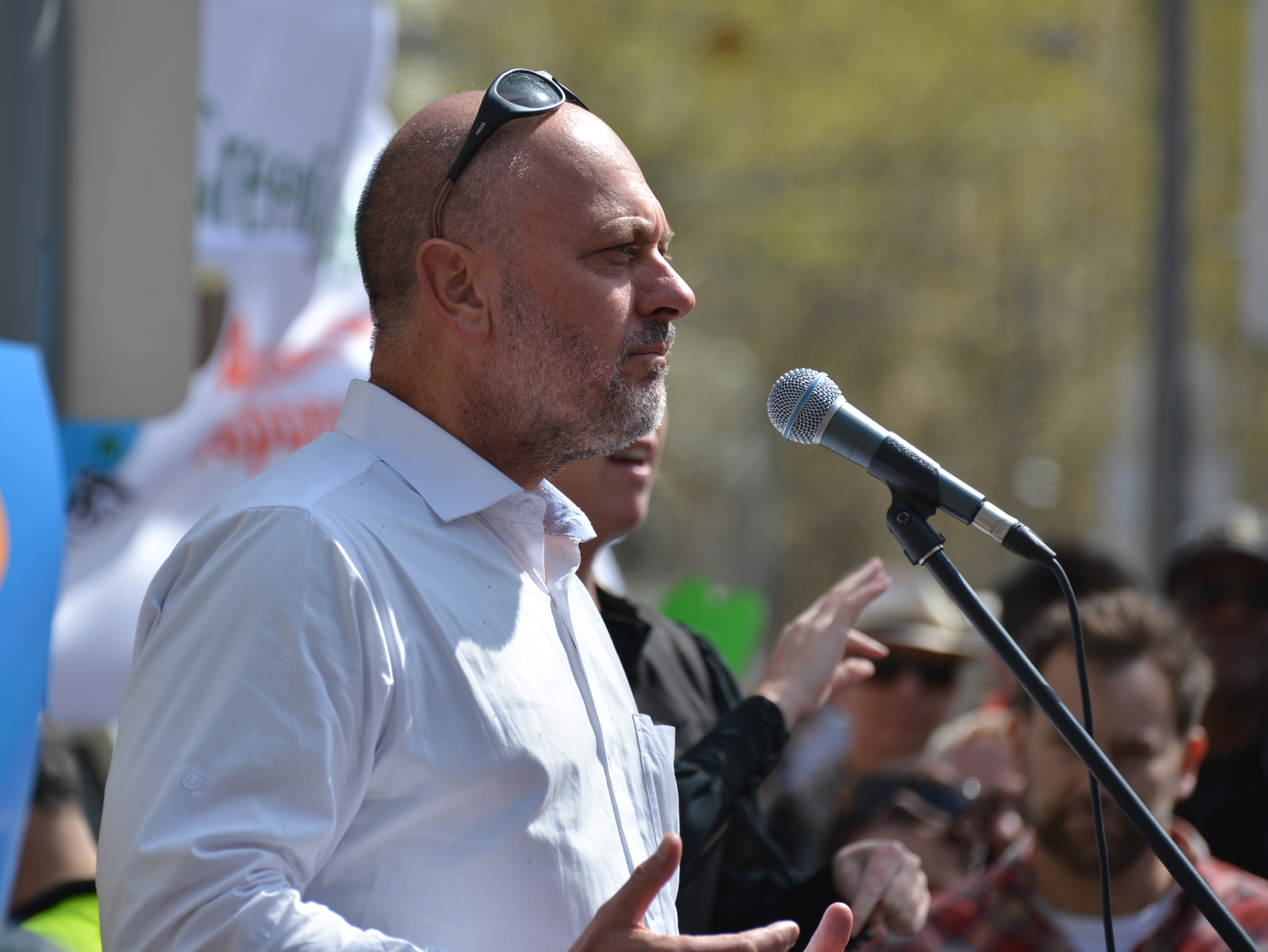
Flannery speaking at the Peoples' Climate March in Melbourne, September 2014

In May 2004, Flannery said in light of the city's water crisis that "I think there is a fair chance Perth will be the 21st century's first ghost metropolis", a warning reiterated in 2007. In 2005, he issued several warnings about water issues in Australia, saying "water is going to be in short supply across the eastern states". In June 2005 warning that "the ongoing drought could leave Sydney's dams dry in just two years".

In October 2006 Flannery quoted a US Navy study stating that, there may be, "no Arctic icecap in Summer in the next five to 15 years. He also quoted NASA's Professor James Hansen, "arguably the world authority on climate change" who said, "we have just a decade to avert a 25-metre rise of the sea". In February 2007, as he explained how increased soil evaporation impacts on runoff, he said "even the [existing amount of] rain that falls isn't actually going to fill our dams and our river systems" and in June 2007, he said that, "Adelaide, Sydney and Brisbane, water supplies are so low they need desalinated water urgently, possibly in as little as 18 months".

In May 2008, Flannery suggested that sulphur could be dispersed into the atmosphere to help block the sun leading to global dimming, in order to counteract the effects of global warming.

In 2019, Flannery said, "Sadly, I've been aware of [the urgency to act] for a long time. We have to reduce emissions as hard and fast as possible... The speed and scale of impacts have been something that is really shocking." He continued to warn people that, "People are shocked, but they should be angry...The consequences will grow year by year, and stuff we were warning people about 20 years ago is now coming to fruition and is impossible to deny, unless you are wilfully blind." He also said that climate activism during the previous two decades had been a "colossal failure", but praised Greta Thunberg, school strikes for climate and Extinction Rebellion for their impact on the climate movement during the 2010s.

=== Energy ===
In response to the introduction of proposed clean coal technology, Flannery has stated: "Globally there has got to be some areas where clean coal will work out, so I think there will always be a coal export industry [for Australia] ... Locally in Australia because of particular geological issues and because of the competition from cleaner and cheaper energy alternatives, I'm not 100 per cent sure clean coal is going to work out for our domestic market."

Flannery has advocated for a renewable energy transition in Australia. He joined calls for the cessation or reduction of conventional coal-fired power generation in Australia in the medium term, at a time when it was the source of most of the nation's electricity. Flannery's view is that conventional coal burning will lose its social licence to operate, comparing it to asbestos.

In 2006 Flannery was in support of nuclear power as a possible solution for reducing Australia's carbon emissions; however, in 2007 changed his position against it. In May 2007 he told a business gathering in Sydney that while nuclear energy does have a role elsewhere in the world, Australia's abundance of renewable resources rule out the need for nuclear power in the near term. He does, however, feel that Australia should and will have to supply its uranium to those other countries that do not have access to renewables like Australia does.

==== Geothermia ====
In September 2005 Flannery said, "There are hot rocks in South Australia that potentially have enough embedded energy in them to run Australia's economy for the best part of a century". For the Cooper Basin, he proposed the establishment of a fully sustainable city where, "hundreds of thousands of people would live", utilising these geothermal energy reserves. He named the hypothetical city "Geothermia". Subsequently, in 2007, an exploration company was established. The company expected to raise at least $11.5m on the Australian Stock Exchange. Flannery took up shares in the company. In 2010, the Federal Government provided the company with another $90m for the development work. In August 2016, the geothermal energy project closed as it was not financially viable.

=== Hunting and whaling ===
When, in the concluding chapters of The Future Eaters (1994), Flannery discusses how to "utilise our few renewable resources in the least destructive way", he remarks that

A far better situation for conservation in Australia would result from a policy which allows exploitation of all of our biotic heritage, provided that it all be done in a sustainable manner. .... [I]f it is possible to harvest for example, 10 mountain pygmy-possums (Burramys parvus) or 10 southern right whales (Balaena glacialis) per year, why should we not do it? ... Is it more moral to kill and consume a whale, without cost to the environment, than to live as a vegetarian in Australia, destroying seven kilograms of irreplaceable soil, ... for each kilogram of bread we consume?

In late 2007, Flannery suggested that the Japanese whaling involving the relatively common minke whale may be sustainable:

In terms of sustainability, you can't be sure that the Japanese whaling is entirely unsustainable... It's hard to imagine that the whaling would lead to a new decline in population [...]

This raised concerns among some environmental groups such as Greenpeace, fearing it could add fuel to the Japanese wish of continuing its annual cull. In contrast to his stance on the minke whale quota, Flannery has expressed relief over the dumping of the quota of the rarer humpback whale, and further was worried how whales were slaughtered, wishing them to be "killed as humanely as possible". Flannery suggested that krill and other small crustaceans, the primary food source for many large whales and an essential part of the marine food chain, were of greater concern than the Japanese whaling.

=== Species introduction ===
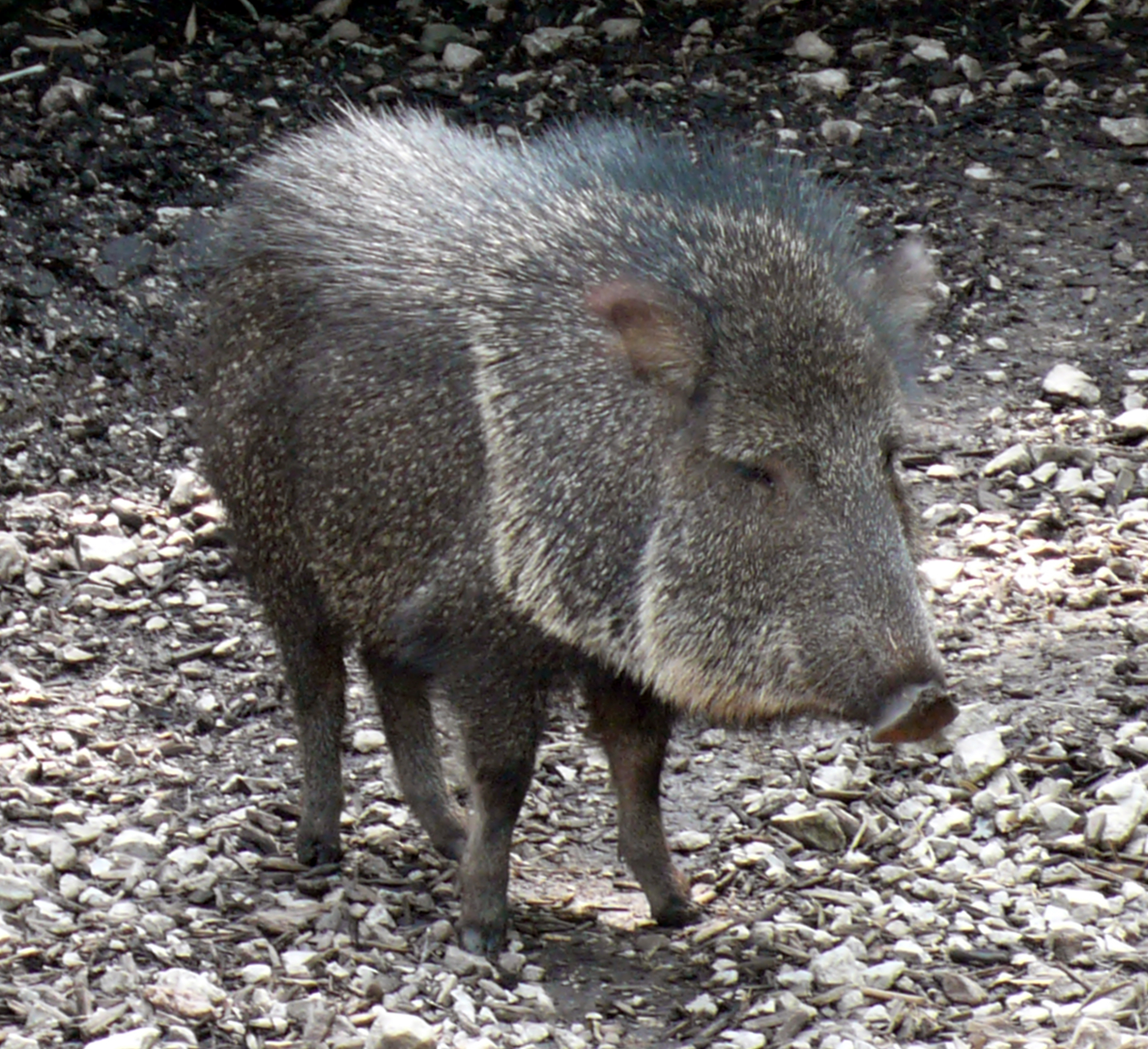
Flannery proposed the Chacoan peccary could be brought from Paraguay to North America, to replace the extinct flat-headed peccary.

In The Future Eaters, Flannery was critical of the European settlers introducing non-native wild animals into Australia's ecosystem. At the same time, he suggested that if one wanted to reproduce, in some parts of Australia, the ecosystems that existed there around 60,000 years ago (before the arrival of the humans on the continent), it may be necessary to introduce into Australia, in a thoughtful and careful way, some non-native species that would be the closest substitutes to the continent's lost megafauna. In particular, he proposed the Komodo dragon be brought into Australia as a replacement for its extinct relative, Megalania, "the largest goanna of all time". He also suggested the Tasmanian devil could be allowed to re-settle the mainland Australia from its Tasmanian refuge area.

In The Eternal Frontier, Flannery made a proposal for what later became nicknamed "Pleistocene rewilding": restoring the ecosystems that existed in North America before the arrival of the Clovis people and the concomitant disappearance of the North American Pleistocene megafauna 13,000 years ago. He proposed if, in addition to the wolves that have been already re-introduced to Yellowstone National Park, ambush predators, such as jaguars and lions should be reintroduced as well, in order to bring the number of elk under control. Furthermore, the closest extant relatives of the species that became extinct around the Clovis period could be introduced to North America's nature reserves as well. In particular, the Indian and African elephants could substitute, respectively, for the mammoth and the mastodon; the Chacoan peccary, for its extinct cousin the flat-headed peccary (Platygonus compressus). Llamas and panthers, which still survive outside of the US, should too be brought back to that country.

=== Human population ===
Flannery advocated for human population planning in Australia in the 1990s. He has been a patron of Sustainable Population Australia since 2000. He said in 2007 that he had stopped discussing population issues, as he said he did not think curbing population growth was a solution to climate change. In 2009, Flannery called for an inquiry into population growth in Australia, to better elucidate the potential environmental impacts of the country's growing population.

=== Humanitarian issues ===
In 2009, Flannery joined the project "Soldiers of Peace", a move against all wars and for a global peace.

In July 2018 he played a role in the Kwaio Reconciliation programme in the Solomon Islands, which put an end to a 91-year-old cycle of killings that stemmed from the murders in 1927 of British Colonial officers Bell and Gillies by Kwaio leader Basiana and his followers.

== Recognition and awards ==
- 1990: Edgeworth David Medal for outstanding research in zoology
- 1996: Rudi Lemberg Travelling Fellowship, Australian Academy of Science
- 1996: POL Eureka Prize for Environmental Research, Australian Museum
- 1996: Colin Roderick Award, Foundation for Australian Literary Studies, for Tree Kangaroos
- 1997: Whitley Medal, Royal Zoological Society of New South Wales
- 1997: Ellis Troughton Memorial Award, Australian Mammal Society
- 2002: First environmental scientist to deliver the Australia Day address to the nation
- 2003: Centenary of Federation Medal, for his services to Australian science
- 2005: Australian Humanist of the Year (2005)
- 2006: Lannan Literary Award for Non-Fiction, US, for The Weather Makers
- 2006: NSW Premier's Literary Awards for Best Critical Writing and Book of the Year, for The Weather Makers
- 2006: ABIA Award, for The Weather Makers
- 2006: The New York Times Best Seller list (The Weather Makers)
- 2006: NSW Australian of the Year
- 2007: Australian of the Year
- 2007: La Trobe Distinguished Alumni Award
- 2010: Joseph Leidy Award, Academy of Natural Sciences, US; the first Australian to receive the award
- 2011: Order of Saint-Charles, Monaco
- 2012: Fellow, Australian Academy of Science (FAA)
- 2014: Invited to deliver the inaugural Australian Museum Research Institute (AMRI) lecture
- 2014: Lifetime Achievement Award from AMRI
- 2015: Jack P. Blaney Award for Dialogue, for advancing people's knowledge of climate change through his writing and research
- 2018: Fellow, Royal Zoological Society of New South Wales
- 2021: Inaugural Talbot Oration at the Australian Museum, named in honour of marine biologist Frank Talbot

== Other activities ==
In addition to writing non-fiction, Flannery has also written unpublished works of fiction.

In 1995 he became a member of the editorial board of the Journal of Zoology. From 1997 until 1999, he was a board member of the New South Wales National Parks Service Foundation as well as on the editorial board of Tropical Biodiversity in Jakarta, Indonesia.

In 2000 he was a member of the National Environmental Education Council, and in 2003 a member of the International Advisory Council for Research and Education at the National Geographic Society. In 2007 he was a member of the Queensland Government's Council of Climate Change.

As of 2015, Flannery was a member of the Wentworth Group of Concerned Scientists, and a governor of WWF-Australia. He was also for a time director of the Australian Wildlife Conservancy.

== Personal life ==
Flannery has described himself as a non-political person, and a humanist rather than atheist.

Flannery rarely discusses his personal life publicly. He met his first wife Paula Kendall while at La Trobe in the 1970s. Flannery and Kendall's house south of Sydney was destroyed in a bushfire in 1994. He has two children with Kendall; the couple separated in 1996.

His second wife is anthropologist Alexandra Szalay. He has a third child with his partner Kate Holden, an author. He moved to Victoria to be with her in 2014.

As of 2018 he owned a house with a solar hot water system at Coba Point on the Hawkesbury River, 40 km (25 mi) north of Sydney, accessible only by boat; after this living location was revealed by broadcaster Ray Hadley he received threats and was given police protection.

== Bibliography ==
=== Books ===
- Flannery, Timothy (1990). Mammals of New Guinea. Carina, Qld.: Robert Brown & Associates.
- Flannery, Tim Fridtjof (1994). The Future Eaters: an ecological history of the Australasian lands and people. Reed Books.
- Tim Flannery (1994), Possums of the World : Monograph of the Phalangeroidea (ISBN 0-646-14389-1).
- Flannery, Timothy (1995). Mammals of New Guinea (New ed.). Chatswood, NSW: Reed/Australian Museum.
- Tim Flannery (1995), Mammals of the South-West Pacific & Moluccan Islands (ISBN 0-7301-0417-6).
- Tim Flannery, Roger Martin and Alexandra Szalay. (1996) Tree Kangaroos: A Curious Natural History.
- Tim Flannery (1998), Throwim Way Leg: An Adventure (ISBN 1-876485-19-1).
- Tim Flannery (2001), The Eternal Frontier: An Ecological History of North America and its Peoples (ISBN 0-8021-3888-8).
- John A. Long, Michael Archer, Tim Flannery and Suzanne Hand (2002), Prehistoric Mammals of Australia and New Guinea: One Hundred Million Years of Evolution, Johns Hopkins Press (ISBN 978-0-801872-23-5).
- Tim Flannery & Peter Schouten (2001), A Gap in Nature (ISBN 1-876485-77-9).
- Tim Flannery & Peter Schouten (2004), Astonishing Animals (ISBN 1-920885-21-8).
- Tim Flannery (2005), Country: A Continent, a Scientist & a Kangaroo (ISBN 1-920885-76-5).
- Tim Flannery (2005), The Weather Makers: The History & Future Impact of Climate Change (ISBN 1-920885-84-6).
- Tim Flannery (2007), Chasing Kangaroos: A Continent, a Scientist, and a Search for the World's Most Extraordinary Creature (ISBN 978-0-8021-1852-3).
- Tim Flannery (2009), Now or Never: A sustainable future for Australia? (ISBN 978-1-86395-429-7).
- Tim Flannery (2009), Now or Never: Why we need to act now for a sustainable future (ISBN 978-1-55468-604-9).
- Tim Flannery (2010), Here on Earth (ISBN 978-1-921656-66-8).
- Tim Flannery (2011), Among the Islands: Adventures in the Pacific (ISBN 978-1-921758-75-1).
- Tim Flannery (2014), The Mystery of the Venus Island Fetish (ISBN 978-1-922079-30-5).
- Tim Flannery (2015), Atmosphere of Hope: Searching for Solutions to the Climate Crisis, Boston: Atlantic Monthly Press (ISBN 978-0-8021-2406-7). Published in the United Kingdom with the title Atmosphere of Hope: Solutions to the Climate Crisis, Penguin Books (ISBN 978-0-1419-8104-8).
- Tim Flannery (2017), Sunlight and Seaweed: An Argument for How to Feed, Power and Clean Up the World
- Tim Flannery (2018), Europe: A Natural History, Text Publishing (ISBN 978-1-9256-0394-1).
- Tim Flannery (2019), Life: Selected Writings, Text Publishing (ISBN 978-1-9222-6829-7).
- Tim Flannery (2020), The Climate Cure: Solving the Climate Emergency in the Era of COVID-19, Text Publishing (ISBN 978-1-9223-3035-2).
- Tim Flannery & Emma Flannery (2024), Big Meg: The Story of the Largest and Most Mysterious Predator that Ever Lived, Text Publishing (ISBN 978-1-9224-5884-1).

As editor

- The Birth of Melbourne (ISBN 1-877008-89-3).
- The Birth of Sydney (ISBN 1-876485-45-0).
- The Explorers (ISBN 1-876485-22-1).
- Watkin Tench, Watkin Tench's 1788 (ISBN 1-875847-27-8).
- Terra Australis: Matthew Flinders' Great Adventures in the Circumnavigation of Australia (ISBN 1-876485-92-2).
- John Morgan, The Life and Adventures of William Buckley (ISBN 1-877008-20-6).
- John Nicol, Life and Adventures: 1776–1801 (ISBN 1-875847-41-3).
- Joshua Slocum, Sailing Alone Around the World (ISBN 1-877008-57-5).

=== Book reviews ===
Year	Review article	Work(s) reviewed
2007	Flannery, Tim (28 June 2007). "We're living on corn!". The New York Review of Books. 54 (11): 26–28. PMID 17595729.	Michael Pollan, The Omnivore's Dilemma: A Natural History of Four Meals; Bill McKibben, Deep Economy: The Wealth of Communities and the Durable Future
2019	Flannery, Tim (7–20 March 2019). "Our twisted DNA". The New York Review of Books. 66 (4): 38–39.	Zimmer, Carl. She has her mother's laugh : the powers, perversions, and potential of heredity. Dutton.
2020	"The First Mean Streets", The New York Review of Books, vol. LXVII, no. 4 (12 March 2020), pp. 31–32	Monica L. Smith, Cities: The First 6,000 Years, Viking, 2019; James C. Scott, Against the Grain: A Deep History of the Earliest States, Yale University Press, 2017
2020	Flannery, Tim (3 December 2020). "In the Soup". The New York Review of Books. LXVII (19): 37–38.	Marshall, Michael (2020). The Genesis Quest: The Geniuses and Eccentrics on a Journey to Uncover the Origins of Life on Earth. University of Chicago Press.

== Filmography ==
=== Television ===
- The Future Eaters (1998)
- Two Men in a Tinnie (2006) with John Doyle
- Two in the Top End (2008) with John Doyle
- Iconoclasts (2010) with Cate Blanchett
- Two on the Great Divide (2012) with John Doyle
- Coast Australia (2013–2017)
- Two Men in China (2014) with John Doyle
- Australia: The Story of Us (2015)

=== Film ===
- Kangaroo: A Love-Hate Story (2017)
- Burning (2021)
