= Dingiso =

Conservation status
- Endangered (IUCN 3.1)

Scientific classification
- Kingdom: Animalia
- Phylum: Chordata
- Class: Mammalia
- Infraclass: Marsupialia
- Order: Diprotodontia
- Family: Macropodidae
- Genus: Dendrolagus
- Species: D. mbaiso

Binomial name
- Dendrolagus mbaiso Flannery, Boeadi & Szalay, 1995
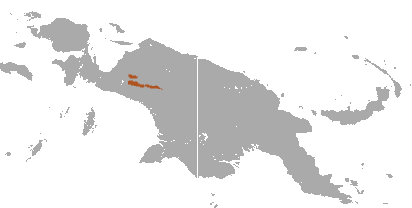
- Dingiso range

Species of marsupial

The dingiso (/dɪŋˈɡiːzoʊ/) (Dendrolagus mbaiso), also known as the bondegezou or bakaga, is an endangered, long-tailed marsupial found only in mountain forests on the west of the island of New Guinea (in Indonesia). It is a species of tree-kangaroo (genus Dendrolagus), which are mammals native to Australia and New Guinea that feed on leaves or other plant matter. It belongs to the macropodid family (Macropodidae) with kangaroos, and carries its young in a pouch like most other marsupials. Though sacred to the local Moni people, it is still threatened by hunting and habitat loss.

Dr Tim Flannery and his team gave the species name mbaiso which means "the forbidden animal" in Moni, because of the local belief that dingiso is the spirit of their ancestors. Locally Dingiso is called Bakaga.

== Distribution ==
The marsupial lives in sub-alpine forests in the Sudirman Range in Central Papua and Highland Papua in Western New Guinea. It lives just below the tree line, at elevations of 3,250–4,200 metres (10,660–13,780 ft).

The species was first filmed for an episode of the BBC documentary South Pacific TV series in 2009, after 11 days of searching with local Moni tribesmen.

According to the IUCN Red List of Threatened Species, the dingiso inhabits mossy forests and shrubland and is "found in rugged areas".

== Description ==
The dingiso has a distinctive pattern of black and white fur, it has a white belly, and a black head, back and limbs. Unlike other tree kangaroos, it spends little time in the trees.

== Taxonomy ==
Dendrolagus mbaiso was formally described to science in 1995 by Australian Museum zoologist Tim Flannery, Indonesian zoologist Boeadi, and Australian anthropologist Alexandra Szalay.

== Behavior ==
The IUCN Red List of Threatened Species states that the dingiso is mainly terrestrial and "very docile".

== Conservation ==
The dingiso remains common in the west because of the protection conferred on it by the Moni people. For many Moni, it is an ancestor which must never be harmed. Nonetheless, Dendrolagus mbaiso is an IUCN Red Listed Endangered species.

Julie Boswell lists "hunting for food, habitat loss, increasing human populations, agricultural stresses, and climate change" as the main threats that the dingiso faces.
