= Throwim Way Leg =

1998 book by Tim Flannery

- First edition
- Author: Tim Flannery
- Language: English
- Genre: Non-fiction
- Publisher: Text Publishing
- Publication date: 1998
- Publication place: Australia
- Pages: 326
- ISBN: 1876485191

Throwim Way Leg is a 1998 non-fiction book by Australian scientist Tim Flannery. It documents Flannery's experiences conducting scientific research in New Guinea. The book describes the flora and fauna of the island and the cultures of its various peoples. The title is an anglicised spelling of the New Guinean Pidgin "Tromoi Lek," to go on a journey.

Flannery recounts his 15 trips to both Papua New Guinea and Western New Guinea in Indonesia beginning in 1981, when he was aged 26. He identifies at least 17 previously undescribed species during this period.
