= The Weather Makers =

2005 book by Tim Flannery

The Weather Makers: The History and Future Impact of Climate Change
- Author: Tim Flannery
- Language: English
- Subject: Climate change
- Published: 2005 (Text Publishing)
- Publication place: Australia
- Media type: Print
- ISBN: 1-920885-84-6

The Weather Makers: The History and Future Impact of Climate Change is a 2005 book by Australian scientist Tim Flannery. It discusses climate change, its scientific basis and effects, and potential solutions.

The book received critical acclaim. It won the major prize at the 2006 New South Wales Premier's Literary Awards, and was short-listed for the 2010 Jan Michalski Prize for Literature. Flannery reflected in 2015 on its impact, after it was read by several high-profile decision makers.

== Description ==
The book includes 36 short essays predicting the consequences of global warming and has been translated into over twenty languages. The book reviews evidence of historical climate change and attempts to compare this with the current era. The book argues that if atmospheric carbon dioxide levels continue to increase at current rates, the resulting climate change will cause mass species extinctions. The book also asserts that global temperatures have already risen enough to cause the annual monsoon rains in the Sahel region of Africa to diminish, causing droughts and desertification. This in turn, according to Flannery, has contributed to the conflict in the Darfur region through competition for disappearing resources. Further consequences, argued in the book, include increasing hurricane intensity, and decline in the health of coral reefs.

The final third of the book discusses proposed solutions. Flannery advocates individual action as well as international and governmental actions. He argues that a few industries such as the coal industry, currently responsible for 40% of the energy consumed in the U.S., remain opponents of needed action. The book retraces the evidence that the American administration, motivated by coal-industry donations to the Republican party, undermines political action by omitting mention of climate change from government documents. The book cites evidence against the argument that conservation is bad for economies.

== Impact ==
In the introduction of Atmosphere of Hope: Solutions to the Climate Crisis (2015), Tim Flannery mention some people who were influenced by reading The Weather Makers (2005) He wrote that the book "alerted" Richard Branson, who recommended it to Arnold Schwarzenegger (Governor of California, who signed the Global Warming Solutions Act of 2006) and established the Virgin Earth Challenge as well as the Carbon War Room. Gordon Campbell, Premier of British Columbia, said that he introduced a carbon tax in British Columbia after reading The Weather Makers. The book also alerted Zhou Ji, president of the Chinese Academy of Engineering, "to the extent of the climate problem".

The book was cited as contributing to Flannery being named Australian of the Year in 2007 for his clear and accessible communication of climate change science and its likely consequences for a fragile planet.

== See also ==
- List of climate change books
- An Inconvenient Truth
- Hell and High Water
- Chasing Kangaroos
- List of Australian environmental books
- Storms of My Grandchildren
- The Weather of the Future
- Requiem for a Species
