= Storms of My Grandchildren =

2009 English-language book by James Hansen

- Author: James E. Hansen
- Illustrator: Makiko Sato
- Subject: Anthropogenic climate change
- Publisher: Bloomsbury Press
- Publication date: 2009
- Pages: 304 pp
- ISBN: 978-1-60819-200-7
- OCLC: 435420333
- Dewey Decimal: 363.73874
- LC Class: QC981.8.G56 H365 2009

Storms of My Grandchildren: The Truth About the Coming Climate Catastrophe and Our Last Chance to Save Humanity is climate scientist James Hansen's first book, published by Bloomsbury Press in 2009. The book is about threats to people and habitability for life on Earth from global warming.

== Themes ==
In the book, Hansen describes how the burning of fossil fuels is changing our climate and argues that this is putting Earth into imminent peril. He suggests that millions of species, and humanity itself, are threatened. The title of the book, Storms of My Grandchildren, refers to the ferocious and stormy weather events that will occur in the next generation if fossil fuel use continues in the way it has.

In Hansen's evaluation, the response of politicians to this crisis has mainly been "greenwashing", where their proposals sound good but amount to little. Hansen says that we immediately need to cut back atmospheric carbon dioxide emissions such that atmospheric concentrations are stabilized at 350 ppm or less, in order to avoid environmental disasters for generations to come. He advocates prompt phaseout of coal plant emissions, plus improved forestry and agricultural practices. Hansen supports a carbon tax returned to citizens as a dividend and rejects cap and trade. He also supports nuclear power and rejects geoengineering.

== Reception ==
Storms of My Grandchildren has been reviewed in Nature, the Los Angeles Times, Science, and Cosmos. An excerpt from the book appeared in The Nation in 2009.

== Author ==
James Hansen was director of the NASA Goddard Institute for Space Studies from 1981 to 2013 and is often called the "father of global warming".

== See also ==
- Global warming
- An Inconvenient Truth
- Six Degrees: Our Future on a Hotter Planet
- The Weather of the Future
- The Weather Makers
- Requiem for a Species
- Whole Earth Discipline

== Publishing information ==
- Hansen, J.E. (2009). Storms of My Grandchildren: The Truth About the Coming Climate Catastrophe and Our Last Chance to Save Humanity. New York: Bloomsbury Press. ISBN 978-1-60819-200-7. Archived from the original on 2016-02-25.
