= The Future Eaters =

Book by Tim Flannery

- First edition
- Author: Tim Flannery
- Publisher: New Holland Publishers
- Publication date: 1994
- ISBN: 9781876334215

The Future Eaters is a 1994 non-fiction book by Australian author Tim Flannery. The book is an ecological history of Australia entailing how humans consume the resources they need for their future, and looking at the journey of the Aboriginal Australian people from Africa to the Australian mainland. Flannery's thesis has both been applauded and disagreed with.
