= Chasing Kangaroos =

Book by Tim Flannery

Chasing Kangaroos: A Continent, a Scientist, and a Search for the World's Most Extraordinary Creature
- Author: Tim Fridtjof Flannery
- Language: English
- Publisher: Grove Press
- Publication date: 2007
- ISBN: 9780802118523

Chasing Kangaroos: A Continent, a Scientist, and a Search for the World's Most Extraordinary Creature, is a 2007 book (ISBN 978-0802118523) by Professor Tim Flannery. The book draws on three decades of travel, research, and field work to explore Australia's kangaroos. Seventy species make up the kangaroo family, which includes wallabies and rat-kangaroos.

Professor Tim Flannery is also author of The Weather Makers, which received much critical acclaim.

== See also ==
- List of Australian environmental books
