= The Weather of the Future =

2010 book by Heidi Cullen

The Weather of the Future: Heat Waves, Extreme Storms, and Other Scenes From a Climate-Changed Planet
- Author: Heidi Cullen
- Language: English
- Genre: Non-fiction
- Publication date: 2010
- ISBN: 978-0-06-172688-0

The Weather of the Future: Heat Waves, Extreme Storms, and Other Scenes From a Climate-Changed Planet (ISBN 978-0-06-172688-0) is a 2010 book by climatologist Heidi Cullen. Cullen takes as her starting point the "clear and present dangers" posed by the greenhouse gases which result from the burning fossil fuels. She offers a vision of what life might be like in a warmer world. Cullen predicts "more frequent and more violent storms, more hot spells, cold spells, droughts, famines and huge waves of desperate refugees".

== See also ==
- An Inconvenient Truth
- Climate refugee
- Effects of climate change
- Extreme weather
- Global warming controversy
- Storms of My Grandchildren
- The Weather Makers
