= Burning (2021 film) =

- Burning release poster
- Directed by: Eva Orner
- Produced by: Jonathan Schaerf; Ben Silverman; Howard Owens; Jason Byrne; Forrest Borie
- Starring: Greg Mullins; Mike Cannon-Brookes; Daisy Jeffrey; Scott Morrison
- Music by: Pascal Babare Thomas Rouch Cornel Wilczek
- Production company: Amazon Studios
- Release date: 26 November 2021
- Country: Australia

Burning is a 2021 Australian documentary film by Eva Orner and Jonathan Schaerf, which documents the massive fires of the 2019–20 Australian bushfire season.

The film discusses previous bushfire seasons in Australia and compares those to the 2019–2020 fires from the perspective of firefighters, residents and the Australian people. Burning notes that the 2019 Amazon rainforest wildfires burned 2.2 million acres, the 2020 California wildfires burned 4.4 million acres, while the Australian Black Summer fires of 2019–2020 burned 59 million acres. It features interviews with environmentalist Tim Flannery and author Bruce Pascoe.

Politically, Burning focuses on the Youth Climate Movement during this time period and the inaction of prime minister Scott Morrison.

== Reception ==
Burning has been compared to An Inconvenient Truth for its precision and fact-based presentation of the issues by showing the perspective of firefighters, residents, young people, tech entrepreneurs, and politicians. The film has a 93% rating on Rotten Tomatoes.
