= Alexandra Szalay =

Australian anthropologist

- Citizenship: Australia
- Education: University of Sydney
- Occupations: Mammalogist; Anthropologist
- Employer: Australian Museum

Alexandra Szalay is an Australian anthropologist and mammalogist, who specialises in the study of Papua New Guinea. The Gebe cuscus (Phalanger alexandrae) is named after her.

== Career ==
Szalay has studied the cultural significance of tree kangaroos to New Guinean people, particularly in body adornment and accessories. She has worked at the Australian Museum, in the anthropology and the mammalogy departments. She undertook postgraduate study at the University of Sydney, where her thesis was entitled: Maokop : the montane cultures of central Irian Jaya : environment, society, and history in highland West New Guinea. As part of her research she catalogued the archives held at the South Australia Museum of the missionaries Norman and Sheila Draper. Szalay has written about religion in West Papua, as well as the West Papuan independence movement.

Szalay is married to the climate campaigner and explorer Tim Flannery. They met when she joined his 1994 expedition to New Caledonia. During the trip they collected Pleistocene fossil fauna from several places, including Kelangurr Cave.

Szalay's father was Hungarian and a pilot in the Second World War.

=== Eponym ===
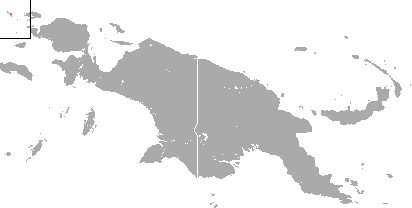
Gebe Cuscus area

Whilst a member of the 1994 expedition with Tim Flannery and Indonesian scientist Boeadi, a new species of cuscus was described for the first time and named after Szalay. The cuscus is only found in the island of Gebe in the North Moluccas. The Gebe cuscus (Phalanger alexandrae) lives between sea level and 300m and is endemic to the island in inhabits.
