= SOCCOM project =

Project to increase the understanding of the Southern Ocean

The Southern Ocean Carbon and Climate Observations and Modeling (SOCCOM) project is a large scale National Science Foundation funded research project based at Princeton University that started in September 2014. The project aims to increase the understanding of the Southern Ocean and the role it plays in factors such as climate, as well as educate new scientists with oceanic observation.

In total, oceanographers and climatologists from thirteen research institutions collaborate in three distinct teams, each of which with a primary focus; the teams include observations, broader impacts, and modeling.

The project makes use of Argo float technology to monitor the temperature, salinity, and velocity of the ocean to a depth of 2000 meters. The SOCCOM regional ARGO array is being fitted with biogeochemical sensors to measure additional components such as oxygen, nutrients, pH, chlorophyll, and particulates. The floats are free drifting pods that are deposited at specific sites where they submerge themselves and drift, all while gathering useful data. Argo floats are ideal for this project due to the often harsh conditions of the Southern Ocean, where manned expeditions can be treacherous.

== Mechanisms and Importance of Southern Ocean on Global Scale ==
The Southern Ocean is under study due to the unique phenomena that occur within and around it. For example, despite only comprising about 30% of the Earth's ocean area, the Southern Ocean accounts for approximately half of the oceanic carbon uptake, as well as the majority of the oceanic heat uptake, induced by anthropogenic activities. These characteristics are believed to be the result of a unique oceanic circulation found in the South Ocean.

Upwelling in the Southern Ocean

Cold water upwells from the deep, and this water is deficient in carbon. Once this water comes into contact with the warmer atmosphere, the anthropogenic carbon (CO_{2}) and heat is absorbed into the ocean. The now warm and carbon containing surface water is then moved by means of the Ekman transport. Along with this transport, nutrients are brought along to lower latitudes where the ecosystems depend on them. After the transport, the water subducts, where the carbon and heat mix with the deeper mixed layers. The excess carbon sequestered by the ocean results in ocean acidification, which has an especially large impact on the Southern Ocean since this ocean basin naturally has lower calcium carbonate concentrations. The increasing acidity will decrease the calcium carbonate concentrations even more making it difficult for calcifying organisms to develop and survive. The decline of calcifying organisms will have serious repercussions for the rest of the food web in the Southern Ocean, so it is important to quantify how much this ocean is acidifying.

== Role of Argo Floats in SOCCOM ==
The better quantification of biogeochemical variables in the oceans has been an ongoing effort and primarily this has been done with the collection of water samples via ships that are later analyzed in a lab. The benefits of measurements obtained from ships are that they are accurate and have a high vertical resolution. However, the samples collected lack spatial and temporal resolution and are biased based on where and when the ship is able to sample. This is why Argo floats are used for the SOCCOM project because they are able to collect data in the Southern Ocean where ships do not have access, and they are able to be in this environment when the conditions are too harsh for ships. Argo floats are also able to collect data on large temporal and spatial scales, which is important for determining how biogeochemical processes are changing in the Southern Ocean and the mechanisms driving the changes

== Variables Measured by Argo Floats in SOCCOM ==
Besides the basic CTD (Conductivity Temperature and Depth) Profilers that are found on most floats, SOCCOM floats are outfitted with additional biogeochemical sensors that measure oxygen, nitrate, pH, and chlorophyll. With the expansion of new biogeochemical sensors has come the need to develop methods to make the sensors as accurate as possible.

- Oxygen measurements

New methods are being developed to make the oxygen sensors more accurate including the frequent calibration of the sensors when the floats are at the surface. Oxygen measurements collected by floats with this calibration process improves the measurements to within a 1% accuracy in reference to measurements determined from the Winkler test for dissolved oxygen. The amount of dissolved oxygen in the water represents the amount of primary productivity and respiration of the region. This link between oxygen levels and biological processes means that oxygen and carbon are related, and proportions of oxygen to carbon are determined via the Redfield Ratio. This means that with measurements of dissolved oxygen, carbon concentrations can also be determined.

- pH measurements

The acidity of the water is measured with ion sensitive pH sensors attached to the Argo floats. The amphoteric oxide coating of the transistor conduction channel allows for the surface charge to change depending on pH. This dependency of surface change on pH allows for the pH of the solution to be determined. The pH measurements of the Southern Ocean are of particular interest to scientists because this ocean sequesters a large amount of carbon dioxide, which results in the increasing acidification of the water as the carbon dioxide reacts with water to form carbonic acid. Therefore, the response of the acidity of the Southern Ocean in relation to the amount of carbon dioxide it sequesters is an objective of the SOCCOM project.

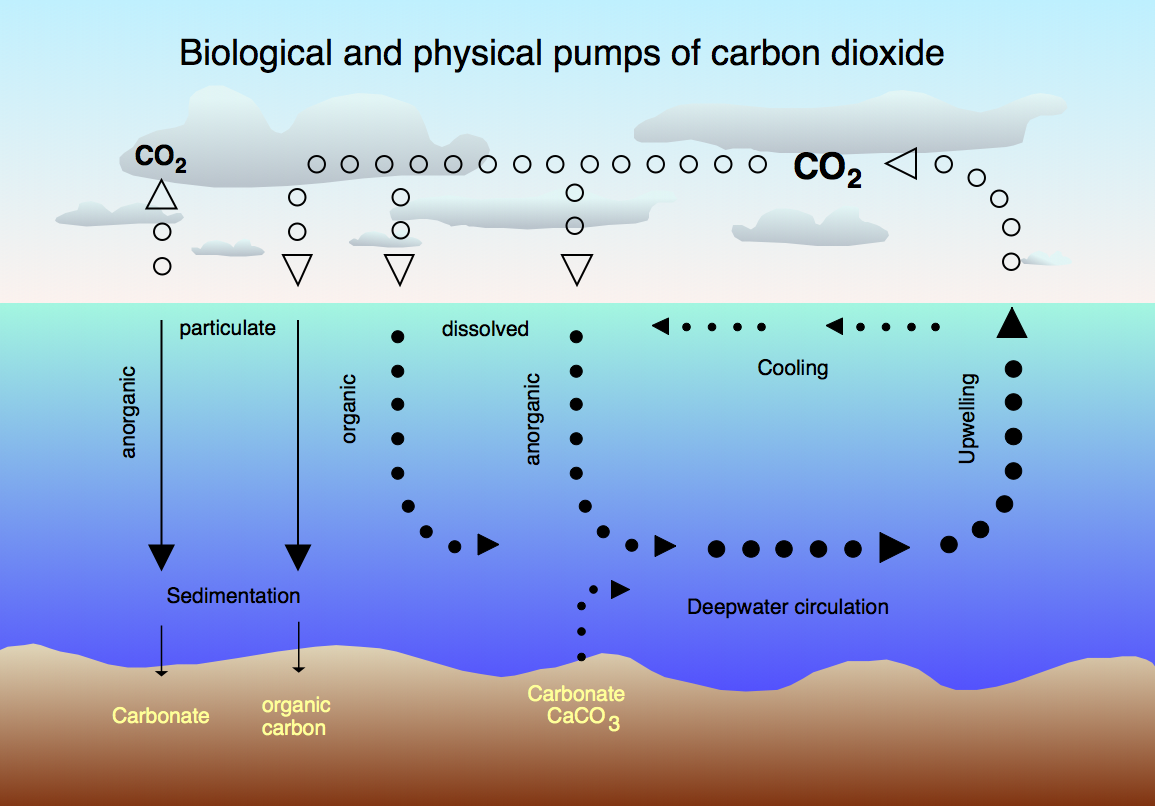
The CO_{2} cycle between the atmosphere and the ocean

- Chlorophyll

Chlorophyll is a proxy for phytoplankton abundance, therefore mapping of chlorophyll results in a greater understanding of how nutrients are cycling in an area. When chlorophyll is hit with a light of certain wavelength, it emits a higher wavelength back, so to measure chlorophyll, Argo floats are outfitted with sensors that emit light at the specific wavelength and then record the wavelength returned emitted wavelength. From the wavelength of emitted light, the distribution of chlorophyll can be determined.

- Nitrate

Nitrate is an important limiting nutrient for phytoplankton and nitrate abundance can determine limits of phytoplankton biomass in the ocean. Nitrate is measured with a UV spectrometer since nitrate is absorbed in a distinct spectrum that can be used to calculate nitrate concentrations.
