= James Hansen =

American physicist (born 1941)

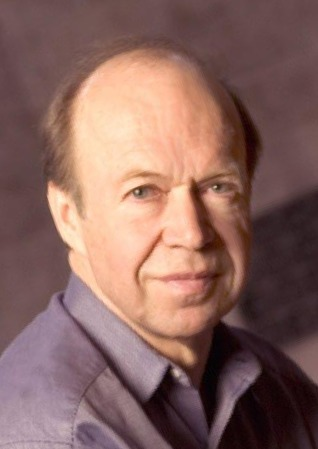
- Hansen in 2005
- Born: James Edward Hansen; March 29, 1941 (age 85); Denison, Iowa, U.S.
- Education: University of Iowa
- Known for: Radiative transfer; Planetary atmospheres; Climate models
- Awards: Klopsteg Memorial Award (2011); Member of the National Academy of Sciences; Carl-Gustaf Rossby Research Medal; BBVA Foundation Frontiers of Knowledge Award (2016) Tang Prize (2018) Heinz Award in the Environment (2001)
- Scientific career
- Fields: Atmospheric physics
- Workplaces: Currently Columbia University; NASA Goddard Institute for Space Studies 1967–2013
- Thesis: The atmosphere of Venus : a dust insulation model (1967)
- Doctoral advisor: Satoshi Matsushima
- Website: www.columbia.edu/~jeh1

James Edward Hansen (born March 29, 1941) is an American climatologist. He is an adjunct professor directing the Program on Climate Science, Awareness and Solutions at Columbia University.

He is best known for his research in climatology, his 1988 Congressional testimony on climate change that helped raise broad awareness of global warming, and his advocacy of action to avoid dangerous climate change.

In recent years, he has become a climate activist to mitigate the effects of global warming, on a few occasions leading to his arrest.

In 2000, Hansen had proposed an alternative scenario for combating the threat of global warming by focusing on reducing non-CO_{2} greenhouse gases (GHGs). His estimates of global climate had found that non-CO_{2} GHGs (such as methane) caused more observed global warming than carbon dioxide. However, he pointed out that CO_{2} would become the dominant climate forcing, if global emissions continued to rise.

== Early life and education ==
Hansen was born in Denison, Iowa, to James Ivan Hansen and Gladys Ray Hansen. He was trained in physics and astronomy in the space science program of James Van Allen at the University of Iowa. He obtained a B.A. in physics and mathematics with highest distinction in 1963, an M.S. in astronomy in 1965 and a Ph.D. in physics in 1967, all three degrees from the University of Iowa. He participated in the NASA graduate traineeship from 1962 to 1966 and, at the same time, between 1965 and 1966, he was a visiting student at the Institute of Astrophysics at Kyoto University and in the department of astronomy at the University of Tokyo. He then began work at the Goddard Institute for Space Studies in 1967.

== Career ==
After graduate school, Hansen continued his work with radiative transfer models, attempting to understand the Venusian atmosphere. He later applied and refined these models to understand the Earth's atmosphere, and in particular, the effects that aerosols and trace gases have on Earth's climate. His development and use of global climate models has contributed to the further understanding of the Earth's climate. In 2009, his first book, Storms of My Grandchildren, was published. In 2012, he presented the TED Talk "Why I must speak out about climate change".

From 1981 to 2013, Hansen served as director of the NASA Goddard Institute for Space Studies (GISS) in New York City, a component of the Goddard Space Flight Center.

As of 2014, Hansen directed the Program on Climate Science, Awareness and Solutions at Columbia University's Earth Institute. The program seeks to connect advances in climate science with public awareness and policy advocacy through a combination of research, communication, and outreach activities.

Hansen served as guardian for future generations in the climate lawsuit Juliana v. United States, in which his granddaughter Sophie Kivlehan was one of the youth plaintiffs challenging the U.S. government's climate and energy policies.

== Research and publications ==
As a college student at the University of Iowa, Hansen was attracted to science and the research done by James Van Allen's space science program in the physics and astronomy department. A decade later, his focus shifted to planetary research that involved trying to understand the climate change on earth that will result from anthropogenic changes of the atmospheric composition.

Hansen has stated that one of his research interests is radiative transfer in planetary atmospheres, especially the interpretation of remote sensing of the Earth's atmosphere and surface from satellites. Because of the ability of satellites to monitor the entire globe, they may be one of the most effective ways to monitor and study global change. His other interests include the development of global circulation models to help understand the observed climate trends, and diagnosing human impacts on climate.

=== Studies of Venus ===
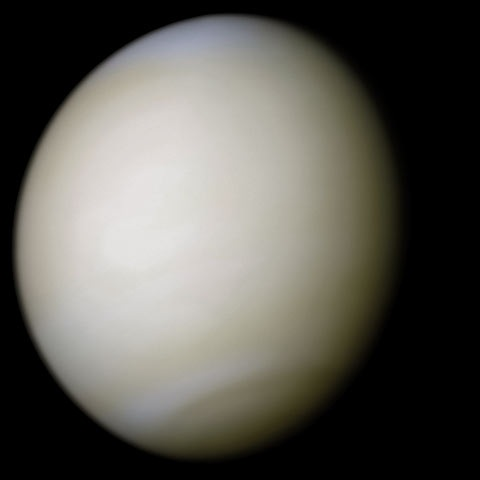
Venus is surrounded by a thick atmosphere composed mainly of carbon dioxide and nitrogen, and its clouds are sulfuric acid. The thickness of the atmosphere initially made it difficult to determine why the surface was so hot.

In the late 1960s and early 1970s, following his Ph.D. dissertation, Hansen published several papers on the planet Venus. Venus has a high brightness temperature in the radio frequencies compared to the infrared. He proposed that the hot surface was the result of aerosols trapping the internal energy of the planet. More recent studies have suggested that several billion years ago, Venus's atmosphere was much more like Earth's than it is now and that there were probably substantial quantities of liquid water on the surface, but a runaway greenhouse effect was caused by the evaporation of that original water, which generated a critical level of greenhouse gases in its atmosphere.

Hansen continued his study of Venus by looking at the composition of its clouds. He looked at the near-infrared reflectivity of ice clouds, compared them to observations of Venus, and found that they qualitatively agreed. He also was able to use a radiative transfer model to establish an upper limit to the size of the ice particles if the clouds were actually made of ice.

By 1974, the composition of Venus' clouds had not yet been determined, with many scientists proposing a wide variety of compounds, including liquid water and aqueous solutions of ferrous chloride. Hansen and Hovenier used the polarization of sunlight reflected from the planet to establish that the clouds were spherical and had a refractive index and cloud drop effective radius which eliminated all of the proposed cloud types except sulfuric acid. Kiyoshi Kawabata and Hansen expanded upon this work by looking at the variation of polarization on Venus. They found that the visible clouds are a diffuse haze rather than a thick cloud, confirming the same results obtained from transits across the sun.

The Pioneer Venus project was launched in May 1978 and reached Venus late that same year. Hansen collaborated with Larry Travis and other colleagues in a 1979 Science article that reported on the development and variability of clouds in the ultraviolet spectrum. They concluded that there are at least three different cloud materials that contribute to the images: a thin haze layer, sulfuric acid clouds and an unknown ultraviolet absorber below the sulfuric acid cloud layer. The linear polarization data obtained from the same mission confirmed that the low- and mid-level clouds were sulfuric acid with radius of about 1 micrometer. Above the cloud layer was a layer of submicrometre haze. Evidence published in the early 1980s showed that the clouds consist mainly of sulfur dioxide and sulfuric acid droplets.

=== Global temperature analysis ===
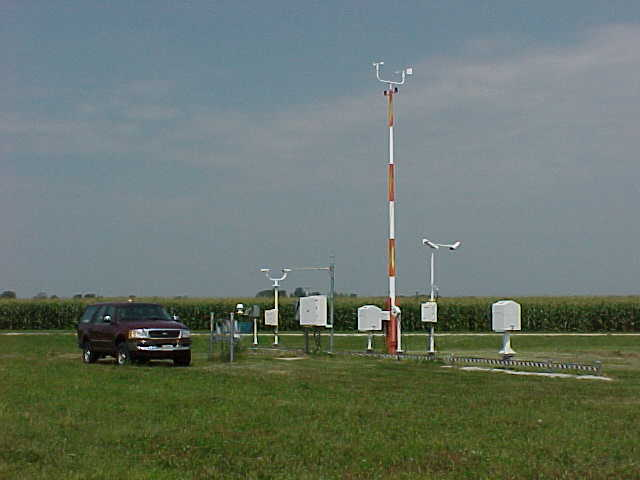
A typical automated airport weather station which records the routine hourly weather observations of temperature, weather type, wind, sky condition, and visibility. These surface stations are located around the world, and are used to derive a global temperature.

The first NASA Goddard Institute for Space Studies (GISS) global temperature analysis was published in 1981. Hansen and his co-author analyzed the surface air temperature at meteorological stations focusing on the years from 1880 to 1985. Temperatures for stations closer together than 1000 kilometers were shown to be highly correlated, especially in the mid-latitudes, providing a way to combine the station data to provide accurate long-term variations. They concluded that global mean temperatures can be determined even though meteorological stations are typically in the Northern hemisphere and confined to continental regions. Warming in the past century was found to be 0.5-0.7 °C, with warming similar in both hemispheres. When the analysis was updated in 1988, the four warmest years on record were all in the 1980s. The two warmest years were 1981 and 1987. During a senate meeting on June 23, 1988, Hansen reported that he was ninety-nine percent certain the earth was warmer then than at any time in the history of instrumental measurements, there was a clear cause and effect relationship with the greenhouse effect and lastly that due to global warming, the likelihood of freak weather was steadily increasing.

With the 1991 eruption of Mount Pinatubo, 1992 saw a cooling in global temperatures. There was speculation that this would cause the next couple of years to be cooler because of the large serial correlation in the global temperatures. Bassett and Lin found the statistical odds of a new temperature record to be small. Hansen countered by saying that having insider information shifted the odds to those who know the physics of the climate system, and that whether there is a new temperature record depends upon the particular data set used.

The temperature data was updated in 1999 to report that 1998 was the warmest year since the instrumental data began in 1880. They also found that the rate of temperature change was larger than at any time in instrument history, and concluded that the recent El Niño was not solely responsible for the large temperature anomaly in 1998. In spite of this, the United States had seen a smaller degree of warming, and a region in the eastern U.S. and the western Atlantic Ocean had actually cooled slightly.

2001 saw a major update to how the temperature was calculated. It incorporated corrections due to the following reasons: time-of-observation bias; station history changes; classification of rural/urban station; the urban adjustment based on satellite measurements of night light intensity, and relying more on rural station than urban. Evidence was found of local urban warming in urban, suburban and small-town records.

The anomalously high global temperature in 1998 due to El Niño resulted in a brief drop in subsequent years. However, a 2001 Hansen report in the journal Science states that global warming continues, and that the increasing temperatures should stimulate discussions on how to slow global warming. The temperature data was updated in 2006 to report that temperatures are now 0.8 °C warmer than a century ago, and concluded that the recent global warming is a real climate change and not an artifact from the urban heat island effect. The regional variation of warming, with more warming in the higher latitudes, is further evidence of warming that is anthropogenic in origin.

In 2007, Stephen McIntyre notified GISS that many of the U.S. temperature records from the Historical Climatology Network (USHCN) displayed a discontinuity around the year 2000. NASA corrected the computer code used to process the data and credited McIntyre with pointing out the flaw. Hansen indicated that he felt that several news organizations had overreacted to this mistake. In 2010, Hansen published a paper entitled "Global Surface Temperature Change" describing current global temperature analysis.

Hansen published papers forecasting that 2026 is on track to become the warmest year in recorded history (and that 2027 will likely be warmer still). While mainstream probabilistic models gave 2026 roughly a 27% chance of breaking overall heat records, Hansen argues those models undercount aerosol reductions and accelerated warming: trapping more heat while simultaneously removing the planet's accidental sunscreen.

=== Black carbon studies ===
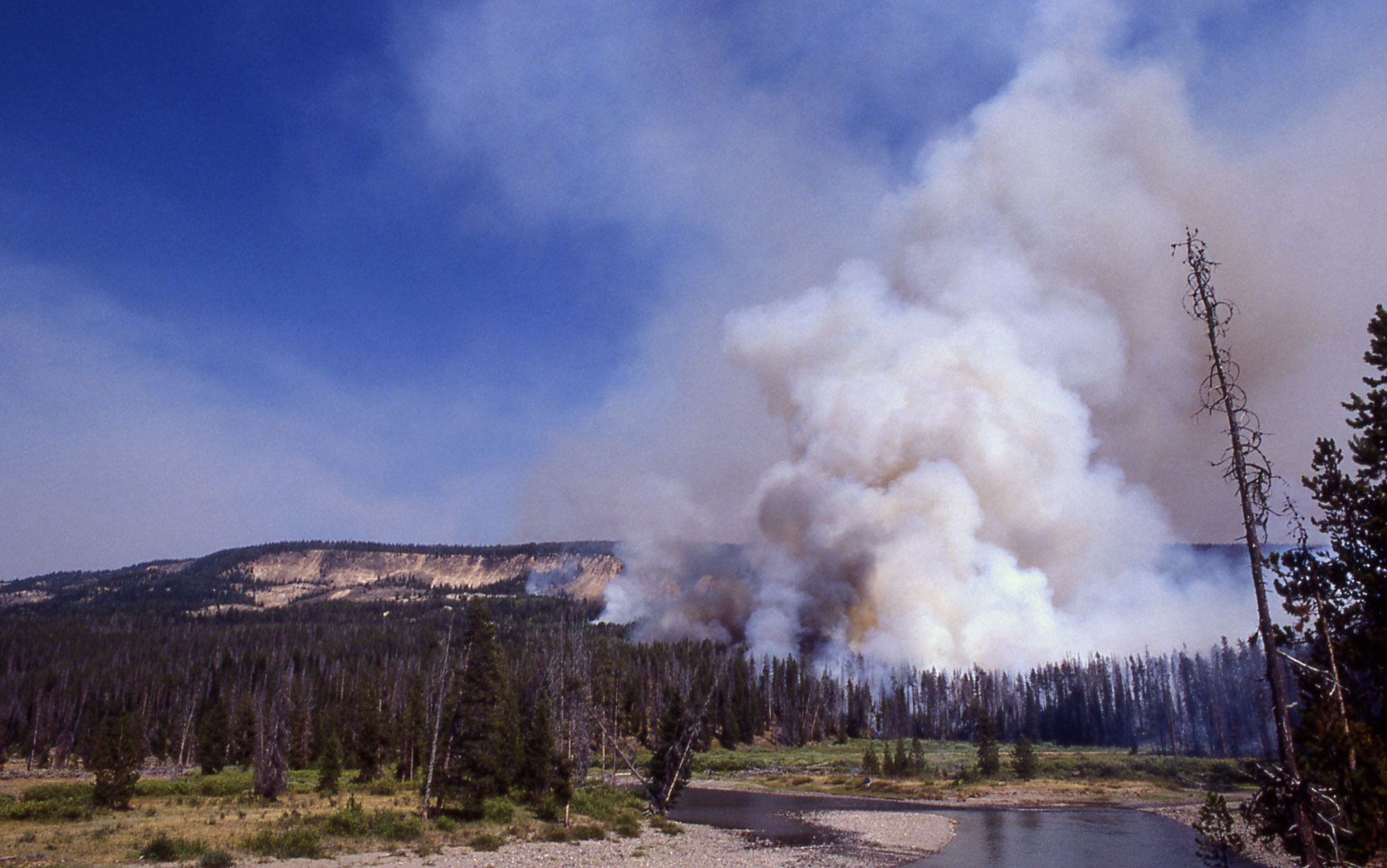
The incomplete combustion of biomass during the Yellowstone fires of 1988 near the Snake River introduced a large quantity of black carbon particles into the atmosphere.

Hansen has also contributed toward the understanding of black carbon on regional climate. In recent decades, northern China has experienced increased drought, and southern China has received increased summer rain resulting in a larger number of floods. Southern China has had a decrease in temperatures while most of the world has warmed. In a paper with Menon and colleagues, through the use of observations and climate models results, they conclude that the black carbon heats the air, increases convection and precipitation, and leads to larger surface cooling than if the aerosols were sulfates.

A year later, Hansen teamed with Makiko Sato to publish a study on black carbon using the global network of AERONET sun photometers. While the location of the AERONET instruments did not represent a global sample, they could still be used to validate global aerosol climatologies. They found that most aerosol climatologies underestimated the amount of black carbon by a factor of at least 2. This corresponds to an increase in the climate forcing of around 1 W/m^{2}, which they hypothesize is partially offset by the cooling of non-absorbing aerosols.

Estimations of trends in black carbon emissions show that there was a rapid increase in the 1880s after the start of the Industrial Revolution, and a leveling off from 1900 to 1950 as environmental laws were enacted. China and India have recently increased their emissions of black carbon corresponding to their rapid development. The emissions from the United Kingdom were estimated using a network of stations that measured black smoke and sulfur dioxide. They report that atmospheric black carbon concentrations have been decreasing since the beginning of the record in the 1960s, and that the decline was faster than the decline in black-carbon-producing fuel use.

A 2007 paper used the GISS climate model in an attempt to determine the origin of black carbon in the arctic. Much of the arctic aerosol comes from south Asia. Countries such as the United States and Russia have a lower contribution than previously assumed.

=== Anthropogenic impact on climate ===
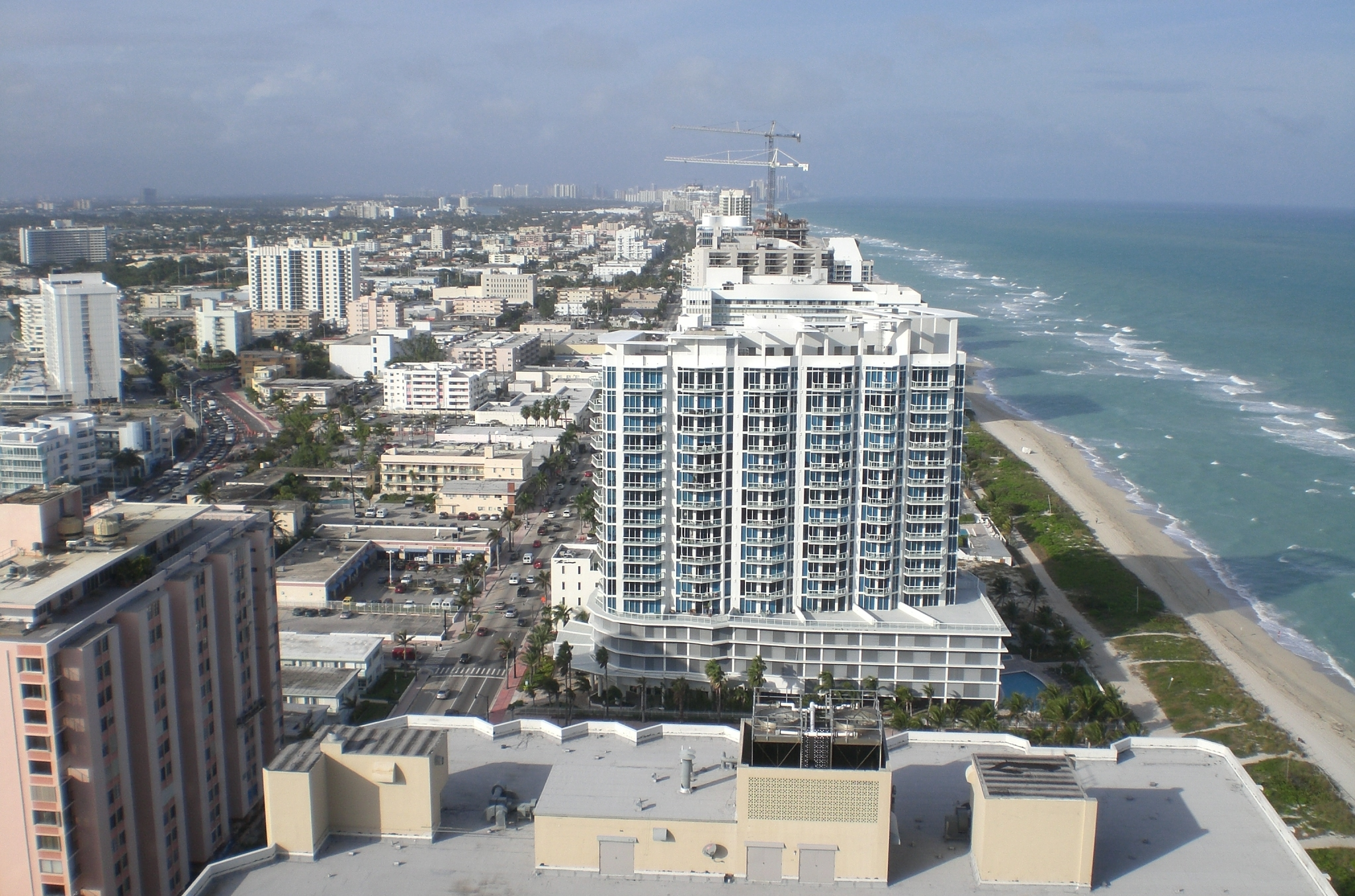
Hansen has warned that low-lying coastal areas such as Florida (seen here), East Anglia, the Netherlands, oceanic islands and Bangladesh are vulnerable to sea levels rising.

The United Nations Framework Convention on Climate Change is an international environmental treaty that has the objective of stabilizing greenhouse gas concentrations in the atmosphere at a level that would prevent dangerous anthropogenic interference with the climate system.

In 2000, Hansen advanced an alternative view of global warming over the last 100 years, arguing that during that time frame the negative forcing via aerosols and the positive forcing via carbon dioxide (CO_{2}) largely balanced each other out, and that the 0.74±0.18 °C net rise in average global temperatures could mostly be explained by greenhouse gases other than carbon dioxide, such as methane and chlorofluorocarbons. However, even then he wrote "the future balance of forcings is likely to shift toward dominance of CO_{2} over aerosols".

In 2003, Hansen wrote a paper called "Can We Defuse the Global Warming Time Bomb?" in which he argued that human-caused forces on the climate are now greater than natural ones, and that this, over a long time period, can cause large climate changes. He further stated that a lower limit on "dangerous anthropogenic interference" was set by the stability of the Greenland and Antarctic ice sheets. His view on actions to mitigate climate change was that "halting global warming requires urgent, unprecedented international cooperation, but the needed actions are feasible and have additional benefits for human health, agriculture and the environment."

In a 2004 presentation at the University of Iowa, Hansen announced that he was told by high-ranking government officials not to talk about how anthropogenic influence could have a dangerous effect on climate because it was not understood what 'dangerous' meant, or how humans were actually affecting climate. He described this as a Faustian bargain because atmospheric aerosols had health risks, and should be reduced, but doing so would effectively increase the warming effects from CO_{2}.

Hansen and coauthors proposed that the global mean temperature was a good tool to diagnose dangerous anthropogenic interference with the climate system. Two elements were identified as particularly important when discussing dangerous anthropogenic interference: sea level rise and the extinction of species. They described a business-as-usual scenario, which has greenhouse gases growing at approximately 2% per year; and an alternate scenario, in which greenhouse gases concentrations decline. Under the alternate scenario, sea levels could rise by 1 meter per century, causing problems due to the dense population in coastal areas. But this would be minor compared to the 10-meter increase in sea level under the business-as-usual scenario. Hansen described the situation with species extinction similarly to that of sea level rise. Assuming the alternate scenario, the situation would not be good, but it would be much worse for business as usual.

The concept of dangerous anthropogenic interference was clarified in a 2007 paper, finding that further warming of 1 °C would be highly disruptive to humans. An alternate scenario would keep the warming to below this if climate sensitivity were below 3 °C for doubled CO_{2}. The conclusion was that CO_{2} levels above 450 ppm were considered dangerous, but that reduction in non-CO_{2} greenhouse gases could provide temporary relief from drastic CO_{2} cuts. Further findings are that arctic climate change has been forced by non-CO_{2} constituents as much as by CO_{2}. The 2007 paper cautioned that prompt action is needed to slow CO_{2} growth and to prevent a dangerous anthropogenic interference.

=== Climate model development and projections ===
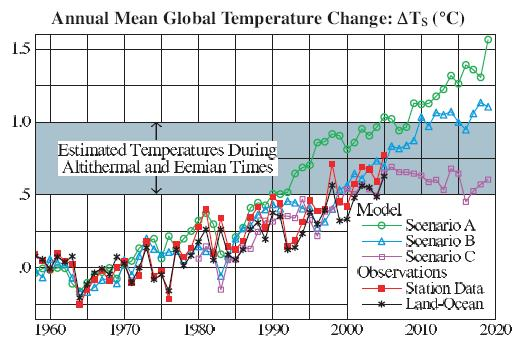
A comparison of global surface temperature computed for three scenarios and compared with two analysis of observational data

Vilhelm Bjerknes began the modern development of the general circulation model in the early 20th century. The progress of numerical modeling was slow due to the slow speed of early computers and the lack of adequate observations. It was not until the 1950s that the numerical models were getting close to being realistic. Hansen's first contribution to numerical climate models came with the 1974 publication of the GISS model. He and his colleagues claimed that the model was successful in simulating the major features of sea-level pressure and 500mb heights in the North American region.

A 1981 Science publication by Hansen and a team of scientists at Goddard concluded that carbon dioxide in the atmosphere would lead to warming sooner than previously predicted. They used a one-dimensional radiative-convective model that calculates temperature as a function of height. They reported that the results from the 1D model are similar to those of the more complex 3D models, and can simulate basic mechanisms and feedbacks. Hansen predicted that temperatures would rise out of the climate noise by the 1990s, much earlier than predicted by other researches. He also predicted that it would be difficult to convince politicians and the public to react.

By the early 1980s, the computational speed of computers, along with refinements in climate models, allowed longer experiments. The models now included physics beyond the previous equations, such as convection schemes, diurnal changes, and snow-depth calculations. The advances in computational efficiency, combined with the added physics, meant the GISS model could be run for five years. It was shown that global climate can be simulated reasonably well with a grid-point resolution as coarse as 1000 kilometers.

The first climate prediction computed from a general circulation model that was published by Hansen was in 1988, the same year as his well-known Senate testimony. The second generation of the GISS model was used to estimate the change in mean surface temperature based on a variety of scenarios of future greenhouse gas emissions. Hansen concluded that global warming would be evident within the next few decades, and that it would result in temperatures at least as high as during the Eemian. He argued that if the temperature rose 0.4 °C above the 1950–1980 mean for a few years, it would be the "smoking gun" pointing to human-caused global warming.

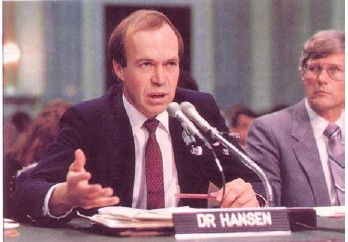
Hansen giving testimony before the United States Congress in 1988

In 2006, Hansen and colleagues compared the observations with the projections made by Hansen in his 1988 testimony before the United States Congress. They described the intermediate scenario as the most likely, and that real-world greenhouse gas forcing had been closest to this scenario. It contained the effects of three volcanic eruptions in the fifty-year projections. They found that the observed warming was similar to two of the three scenarios. The warming rates of the two most modest warming scenarios were nearly the same through the year 2000, and they were unable to provide a precise model assessment. They noted that the agreement between the observations and the intermediate scenario was accidental because the climate sensitivity used was higher than current estimates.

A year later, Hansen joined with Rahmstorf and colleagues comparing climate projections with observations. The comparison was done from 1990 through January 2007 against physics-based models that are independent from the observations after 1990. They showed that the climate system may be responding faster than the models indicate. Rahmstorf and coauthors showed concern that sea levels are rising at the high range of the IPCC projections, and that this was due to thermal expansion and not from melting of the Greenland or Antarctic ice sheets.

Following the launch of spacecraft capable of determining temperatures, Roy Spencer and John Christy published the first version of their satellite temperature measurements in 1990. Contrary to climate models and surface measurements, their results showed a cooling in the troposphere. However, in 1998, Wentz and Schabel determined that orbital decay had an effect on the derived temperatures. Hansen compared the corrected troposphere temperatures with the results of the published GISS model, and concluded that the model is in good agreement with the observations, noting that the satellite temperature data had been the last holdout of global warming denialists, and that the correction of the data would result in a change from discussing whether global warming is occurring to what is the rate of global warming, and what should be done about it.

Hansen has continued the development and diagnostics of climate models. For instance, he has helped in the investigations of the decadal trends in tropopause height, which could be a useful tool for determining the human "fingerprint" on climate. As of 12 February 2009, the current version of the GISS model is Model E. This version has seen improvements in many areas, including upper-level winds, cloud height, and precipitation. This model still has problems with regions of marine stratocumulus clouds. A later paper showed that the model's main problems are having too weak of an ENSO-like variability, and poor sea ice modeling, resulting in too little ice in the Southern Hemisphere and too much in the Northern Hemisphere.

=== Climate forcings, feedbacks, and sensitivity ===
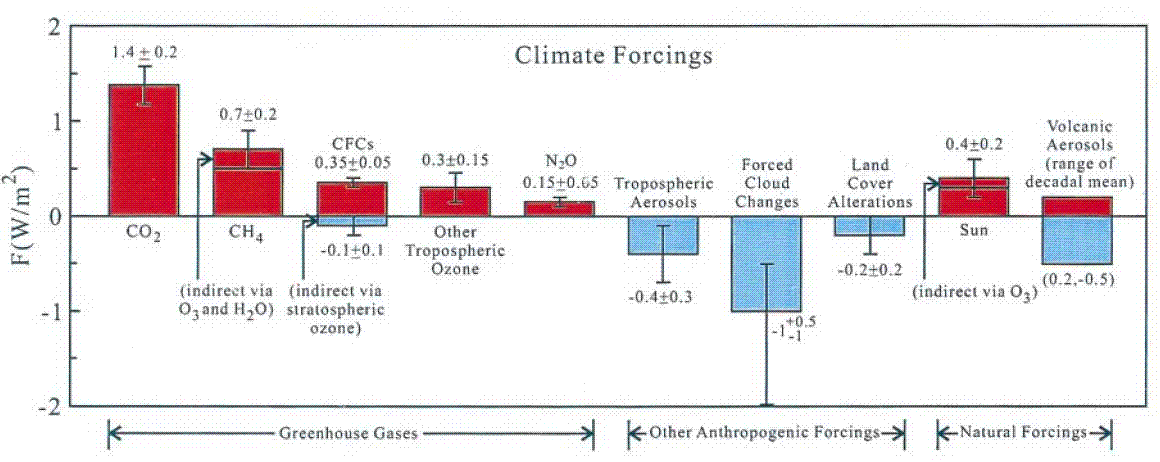
Estimated climate forcings between 1850 and 2000

In 2000 Hansen authored a paper called "Global warming in the twenty-first century: an alternative scenario" in which he presented a more optimistic way of dealing with global warming, focusing on non-CO_{2} gases and black carbon in the short run, giving more time to make reductions in fossil fuel emissions. He notes that the net warming observed to date is roughly as big as that expected from non-CO_{2} gases only. This is because CO_{2} warming is offset by climate-cooling aerosols emitted with fossil fuel burning and because at that time non-CO_{2} gases, taken together, were responsible for roughly 50% of the anthropogenic greenhouse gas warming.

In a 2007 paper, Hansen discussed the potential danger of "fast-feedback" effects causing ice sheet disintegration, based on paleoclimate data. George Monbiot reports "The IPCC predicts that sea levels could rise by as much as 59 centimetres (1.94 ft) this century. Hansen's paper argues that the slow melting of ice sheets the panel expects doesn't fit the data. The geological record suggests that ice at the poles does not melt in a gradual and linear fashion, but flips suddenly from one state to another. When temperatures increased to 2 - 3 °C (3.6-5.4 °F) above today's level 3.5 million years ago, sea levels rose not by 59 centimeters but by 25 metres (82 ft). The ice responded immediately to changes in temperature."

Hansen stressed the uncertainties around these predictions. "It is difficult to predict time of collapse in such a nonlinear problem … An ice sheet response time of centuries seems probable, and we cannot rule out large changes on decadal time-scales once wide-scale surface melt is underway." He concludes that "present knowledge does not permit accurate specification of the dangerous level of human-made [greenhouse gases]. However, it is much lower than has commonly been assumed. If we have not already passed the dangerous level, the energy infrastructure in place ensures that we will pass it within several decades."

In 2013, Hansen authored a paper called "Climate sensitivity, sea level and atmospheric carbon dioxide," in which he estimated climate sensitivity to be (3±1) °C based on Pleistocene paleoclimate data. The paper also concluded that burning all fossil fuels "would make most of the planet uninhabitable by humans."

In 2016, a team of 19 researchers led by Hansen published a paper "Ice melt, sea level rise and superstorms: Evidence from paleoclimate data, climate modeling, and modern observations that 2 °C global warming could be dangerous" describing the effect of meltwater from ice sheets on the Atlantic meridional overturning circulation (slowing it or even stopping) and Antarctic bottom water formation. This would speed up ice sheet melting and sea level rise by increasing the water temperature at hundreds of meters depth, thawing ice shelves from below. And the cool fresh meltwater on the ocean close to Greenland and Antarctica leads to larger temperature difference between tropics and middle latitudes, what would enable storms as strong as in the last interglacial, the Eemian, whose evidence includes, among others, megaboulders on Bahamas.

In 2023, Hansen led a team of 18 researchers to publish a paper titled "Global Warming in the Pipeline." In it, Hansen et al. concluded that a doubling of carbon dioxide in the atmosphere would lead to an increase of 4.8 ±1.2 °C, significantly above earlier estimates. His team also concluded that the decline in global aerosol emissions from air pollution will accelerate the rate of global warming, going from an increase of 0.18 °C per decade between 1970 and 2010 to an increase of 0.27 °C per decade after 2010, with the world passing the 1.5 °C threshold before the end of the 2020s and the 2 °C threshold before 2050 without significant changes. The paper also concluded that sea level rise will be greater than the IPCC estimates and one of the ocean's major circulation systems could collapse before the end of the century.

== Analysis of climate change causation ==
The first action that people should take is to use the democratic process. What is frustrating people, me included, is that democratic action affects elections but what we get then from political leaders is greenwash.

— James Hansen (March 2009)

Hansen noted that in determining responsibility for climate change, the effect of greenhouse gas emissions on climate is determined not by current emissions, but by accumulated emissions over the lifetime of greenhouse gases in the atmosphere.

By this measure, among major economies, as of 2009 the U.K. still had the highest cumulative per capita contribution to climate change, followed by the U.S. and Germany, even though the People's Republic of China currently produces the highest total annual emissions.

On public policy, Hansen is critical of what he sees as efforts to mislead the public on the issue of climate change. He points specifically to the Competitive Enterprise Institute's commercials with the tagline "carbon dioxide—they call it pollution, we call it life", and politicians who accept money from fossil-fuel interests and then describe global warming as "a great hoax." He also says that changes needed to reduce global warming do not require hardship or reduction in the quality of life, but will also produce benefits such as cleaner air and water, and growth of high-tech industries. He was a critic of both the Clinton and George W. Bush Administrations' stances on climate change. Addressing the potential effects of climate change, Hansen has stated in an interview in January 2009, "We cannot now afford to put off change any longer. We have to get on a new path within this new administration. We have only four years left for Obama to set an example to the rest of the world. America must take the lead."

== Climate change activism ==
=== US Senate committee testimony ===
Hansen was invited by Rafe Pomerance to testify before the United States Senate Committee on Energy and Natural Resources on June 23, 1988. Hansen testified that "Global warming has reached a level such that we can ascribe with a high degree of confidence a cause and effect relationship between the greenhouse effect and observed warming...It is already happening now" and "The greenhouse effect has been detected and it is changing our climate now...We already reached the point where the greenhouse effect is important." Hansen said that NASA was 99% confident that the warming was caused by the accumulation of greenhouse gases in the atmosphere and not a random fluctuation.

According to science historian Spencer R. Weart, Hansen's testimony increased public awareness of climate change. According to Richard Besel of California Polytechnic State University, Hansen's testimony "was an important turning point in the history of global climate change." According to Timothy M. O'Donnell of the University of Mary Washington, Hansen's testimony was "pivotal," "ignited public discussion of global warming and moved the controversy from a largely scientific discussion to a full blown science policy debate," and marked "the official beginning of the global warming policy debate." According to Roger A. Pielke of the National Center for Atmospheric Research, Hansen's "call to action" "elevated the subject of global warming and the specter of associated impacts such as more hurricanes, floods, and heat waves, to unprecedented levels of attention from the public, media, and policy makers."

=== Criticism of coal industry ===
Hansen has been particularly critical of the coal industry, stating that coal contributes the largest percentage of anthropogenic carbon dioxide into the atmosphere. He has called for phasing out coal power completely by the year 2030.

During his testimony before the Iowa Utilities Board in 2007, Hansen likened coal trains to "death trains" and asserted that these would be "no less gruesome than if they were boxcars headed to crematoria, loaded with uncountable irreplaceable species." In response, the National Mining Association stated that his comparison "trivialized the suffering of millions" and "undermined his credibility." Citing the reactions of "several people" and "three of his scientific colleagues" as his primary motivation, Hansen stated that he certainly did not mean to trivialize suffering by the families who lost relatives in the Holocaust and then apologized, saying he regretted that his words caused pain to some readers.

==== Mountaintop removal mining ====
On June 23, 2009, James Hansen, along with 30 other protesters including actress Daryl Hannah, was arrested on misdemeanor charges of obstructing police and impeding traffic, during a protest against mountaintop removal mining in Raleigh County, West Virginia. The protesters intended to enter the property of Massey Energy Company, but were blocked by a crowd of several hundred coal miners and supporters. Hansen said that mountaintop removal for coal mining "[provides] only a small fraction of our energy" and "should be abolished." Hansen called on President Barack Obama to abolish mountaintop coal mining.

After Hansen's arrest, New York Times columnist Andrew Revkin wrote: "Dr. Hansen has pushed far beyond the boundaries of the conventional role of scientists, particularly government scientists, in the environmental policy debate."

Hansen and about 100 other people were arrested in September 2010 in front of the White House in Washington, DC. The group was seeking a ban on mountaintop removal or surface mining.

=== Cap and trade ===
In 2009 Hansen spoke out against cap and trade, advocating instead what he believes would be a progressive carbon tax at source carbon as oil, gas or coal, with a 100% dividend returned to citizens in equal shares, as proposed by Citizens' Climate Lobby. He has made many appearances and talks supporting the work of CCL.

=== Retirement from NASA ===
Hansen retired from NASA in April 2013 after 46 years of government service, saying he planned to take a more active role in the political and legal efforts to limit greenhouse gases. The same month, the National Center for Science Education, an organization noted for defending the teaching of evolution in United States science classrooms, named Hansen as an advisor to support the extension of its area of concern into the teaching of climate change.

=== Keystone Pipeline ===
In a CBC interview aired in April 2013, as Canadian Natural Resources Minister Joe Oliver lobbied in Washington, DC for approval of the Keystone pipeline extension intended to carry more synthetic crude oil from Canada's Athabasca Oil Sands to the Gulf of Mexico, Hansen forcefully argued against the use of these unconventional fossil fuels. According to Intergovernmental Panel on Climate Change (IPCC) and other energy organizations "there is more than twice as much carbon in the tar sands oil" than in conventional oil. Hansen argued that coal, tar sands, and tar shale should not be used as energy sources because of their carbon emissions and claimed that the completion of the Keystone pipeline would increase the extraction of oil from oil sands. He explained that the effects of climate change may not be apparent until the far future: "It's not the case where you emit something and you see the effect. We see the beginnings of the effect but the large impacts are going to be in future decades and that science is crystal clear … Effects come slowly because of the inertia of the climate system. It takes decades, even centuries to get the full response. But we know the last time the world was 2 degrees warmer, sea level was 6 meters or 20 feet higher." Hansen urged President Obama to reject the Keystone pipeline extension intended to carry more synthetic crude oil from Canada's Athabasca Oil Sands to the Gulf of Mexico. On February 13, 2013, Hansen was again arrested at the White House, along with Daryl Hannah and Robert F. Kennedy, Jr., during a further protest against the proposed Keystone pipeline extension.

=== Proposed solutions ===
Recently Hansen stated his support for a revenue-neutral fee and dividend system to impose a price on carbon that returns the money collected from the fossil fuel industry equally to all legal residents of the United States. In an interview on CBC television on March 3, 2015, Dr Hansen stated "The solution [to climate change] has to be a rising price on carbon and then the really dirty fuels like tar sands would fall on the table very quickly. They make no sense at all if you look at it from an economic-wide perspective. If we would simply put a fee on carbon – you would collect from the fossil fuel companies at the source (the domestic mines or the ports of entry) and then distribute that money to the public, an equal amount to all legal residents, that would begin to make the prices honest. And that's what the economy needs in order to be most efficient. Right now the external costs of fossil fuels are borne completely by the public. If your child gets asthma, you pay the bill, the fossil fuel company doesn't. What we need is to make the system honest."

At the end of 2008, Hansen stated five priorities that he felt then President-elect Barack Obama should adopt "for solving the climate and energy problems, while stimulating the economy": efficient energy use, renewable energy, a smart grid, generation IV nuclear reactors and carbon capture and storage. Regarding nuclear, he expressed opposition to the Yucca Mountain nuclear waste repository, stating that the $25 Billion (US) surplus held in the Nuclear Waste Fund "should be used to develop fast reactors that consume nuclear waste, and thorium reactors to prevent the creation of new long-lived nuclear waste."

In 2009, Hansen wrote an open letter to President Obama where he advocated a "Moratorium and phase-out of coal plants that do not capture and store CO_{2}". In his first book Storms of My Grandchildren, similarly, Hansen discusses his Declaration of Stewardship, the first principle of which requires "a moratorium on coal-fired power plants that do not capture and sequester carbon dioxide".

In March 2013, Hansen co-authored a paper in Environmental Science & Technology, entitled "Prevented mortality and greenhouse gas emissions from historical and projected nuclear power". The paper examined mortality rates per unit of electrical power produced from fossil fuels (coal and natural gas) as well as nuclear power. It estimated that 1.8 million air pollution-caused deaths were prevented worldwide between 1971 and 2009, through the use of nuclear power instead of fossil fuels. The paper also concluded that the emission of some 64 billion tonnes of carbon dioxide equivalent were avoided by nuclear power use between 1971 and 2009. Looking to the future, between 2010 and 2050, it was estimated that nuclear could additionally avoid up to 420,000 to 7 million premature deaths and 80 to 240 billion tonnes of greenhouse gas emissions.

This paper elicited a critical response to Kharecha and Hansen's analysis, from an international group of senior academic energy policy analysts, including Benjamin Sovacool, M.V. Ramana, Mark Z. Jacobson, and Mark Diesendorf. They asserted that nuclear power needs large subsidies to be economically viable, and typically there are substantial construction delays and cost overruns associated with nuclear plants. Sovacool et al. also claim that Kharecha and Hansen's estimates of Chernobyl Disaster mortalities is very low, which biases their conclusions. All of these factors are said to make Kharecha and Hansen's article "incomplete and misleading". Kharecha and Hansen countered that all the data these scientists use to make their criticism, "lacks credibility".

In 2013, Hansen and three other leading climate experts wrote an open letter to policy makers, saying that "continued opposition to nuclear power threatens humanity's ability to avoid dangerous climate change." The reaction from anti-nuclear environmental groups (e.g. the Natural Resources Defense Council, Sierra Club, and Greenpeace) was negative, citing nuclear safety and security issues, and the economics of nuclear power plants.

Together with Michael Shellenberger, Hansen began touring the world in the late 2010s, providing evidence for the climatic benefits of nuclear energy and to bring attention to the $2 trillion the US has spent on "new renewables" that despite the cost have not even caught up to nuclear in annual electricity generation, an issue reflected in Germany and elsewhere.

=== Political interference at NASA ===
In 2006, Hansen alleged that NASA administrators had attempted to influence his public statements about the causes of climate change. Hansen said that NASA public relations staff were ordered to review his public statements and interviews after a December 2005 lecture at the American Geophysical Union in San Francisco. NASA responded that its policies are similar to those of any other federal agency in requiring employees to coordinate all statements with the public affairs office without exception. Two years after Hansen and other agency employees described a pattern of distortion and suppression of climate science by political appointees, the agency's inspector general confirmed that such activities had taken place, with the NASA Office of Public Affairs having "reduced, marginalized or mischaracterized climate change science made available to the general public".

In June 2006, Hansen appeared on 60 Minutes stating that the George W. Bush White House had edited climate-related press releases reported by federal agencies to make global warming seem less threatening. He also stated that he was unable to speak freely without the backlash of other government officials, and that he had not experienced that level of restrictions on communicating with the public during his career.

=== Trials for energy company executives ===
In 2008 interviews with ABC News, The Guardian, and in a separate op-ed, Hansen has called for putting fossil fuel company executives, including the CEOs of ExxonMobil and Peabody Coal, on trial for "high crimes against humanity and nature", on the grounds that these and other fossil-fuel companies had actively spread doubt and misinformation about global warming, in the same way that tobacco companies tried to hide the link between smoking and cancer.

=== Arrest at 2011 demonstration ===
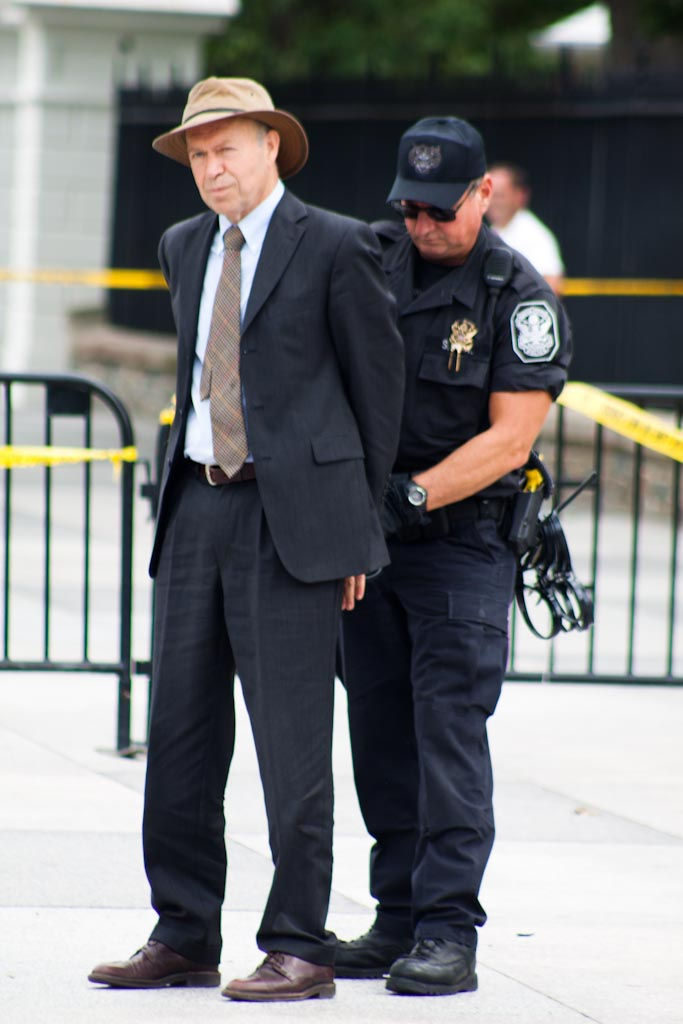
James Hansen arrested at a demonstration outside the White House, August 29, 2011

Hansen and 1,251 other activists were arrested at a two week long protest in August and September 2011, in front of the White House. Hansen urged President Obama to reject the Keystone pipeline extension intended to carry more synthetic crude oil from Canada's Athabasca Tar Sands to the Gulf of Mexico. On February 13, 2013, Hansen was again arrested at the White House, along with Daryl Hannah and Robert F. Kennedy, Jr., during a further protest against the proposed Keystone pipeline extension.

=== Criticism ===
In June 2009, New Yorker journalist Elizabeth Kolbert wrote that Hansen is "increasingly isolated among climate activists." Eileen Claussen, president of the Pew Center on Global Climate Change, said that "I view Jim Hansen as heroic as a scientist.... But I wish he would stick to what he really knows. Because I don't think he has a realistic idea of what is politically possible, or what the best policies would be to deal with this problem."

In July 2009, New York Times climate columnist Christa Marshall asked if Hansen still matters in the ongoing climate debate, noting that he "has irked many longtime supporters with his scathing attacks against President Obama's plan for a cap-and-trade system." "The right wing loves what he's doing," said Joseph Romm, a senior fellow at the Center for American Progress, a liberal think tank. Hansen said that he had to speak out, since few others could explain the links between politics and the climate models. "You just have to say what you think is right," he said.

== Honors and awards ==
Hansen was elected to the National Academy of Sciences in 1996 for his "development of pioneering radiative transfer models and studies of planetary atmospheres; development of simplified and three-dimensional global climate models; explication of climate forcing mechanisms; analysis of current climate trends from observational data; and projections of anthropogenic impacts on the global climate system." In 2001, he received the 7th Annual Heinz Award in the Environment (endowed with US$250,000) for his research on global warming, and was listed as one of Time magazine's 100 Most Influential People in 2006. Also in 2006, the American Association for the Advancement of Science (AAAS) selected James Hansen to receive its Award for Scientific Freedom and Responsibility "for his courageous and steadfast advocacy in support of scientists' responsibilities to communicate their scientific opinions and findings openly and honestly on matters of public importance."

In 2007, Hansen shared the US$1-million Dan David Prize for "achievements having an outstanding scientific, technological, cultural or social impact on our world". In 2008, he received the PNC Bank Common Wealth Award of Distinguished Service for his "outstanding achievements" in science. At the end of 2008, Hansen was named by EarthSky Communications and a panel of 600 scientist-advisors as the Scientist Communicator of the Year, citing him as an "outspoken authority on climate change" who had "best communicated with the public about vital science issues or concepts during 2008."

In 2009, Hansen was awarded the 2009 Carl-Gustaf Rossby Research Medal, the highest honor bestowed by the American Meteorological Society, for his "outstanding contributions to climate modeling, understanding climate change forcings and sensitivity, and for clear communication of climate science in the public arena."

Andrew Freedman wrote in The Washington Post that the Society had erred in giving Hansen the medal: "His body of work is not at issue... Rather, the problem arises due to the AMS' recognition of Hansen's public communication work on climate change."

Hansen won the 2010 Sophie Prize, set up in 1997 by Norwegian Jostein Gaarder, the author of the 1991 best-selling novel and teenagers' guide to philosophy Sophie's World, for his " key role for the development of our understanding of human-induced climate change."

Foreign Policy named Hansen one of its 2012 FP Top 100 Global Thinkers "for sounding the alarm on climate change, early and often".

In December 2012, Hansen received the Commonwealth Club of California's annual Stephen H. Schneider Award for Outstanding Climate Science Communications at a ceremony in San Francisco

On November 7, 2013, Hansen received the Joseph Priestley Award at Dickinson College in Carlisle, Pennsylvania "...for his work advancing our understanding of climate change, including the early application of numerical models to better understand observed climate trends and to project humans' impact on climate, and for his leadership in promoting public understanding of climate and linking the knowledge to action on climate policy." He delivered a lecture, entitled, "White House Arrest and the Climate Crisis," later that same day at Anita Tuvin Schlechter Auditorium on the college's campus.

James Hansen was co-winner with climatologist Syukuro Manabe of the BBVA Foundation Frontiers of Knowledge Award in the Climate Change category in the ninth edition (2016) of the awards. The two laureates were separately responsible for constructing the first computational models with the power to simulate climate behavior. Decades ago, they correctly predicted how much Earth's temperature would rise due to increasing atmospheric CO_{2}. The scores of models currently in use to chart climate evolution are heirs to those developed by Manabe and Hansen.

In June 2018, Hansen was named joint winner, with Veerabhadran Ramanathan, of Taiwan's Tang Prize. Hansen's prize had a total value of NT$25 million.

== Publications ==
Over 160 publications have been authored by James Hansen. Since 2020, he has published observations and commentary at redgreenandblue.org, averaging approximately once per month.

- Hansen, James E. (2009). Storms of My Grandchildren: The Truth About the Coming Climate Catastrophe and Our Last Chance to Save Humanity. New York: Bloomsbury Publishing. ISBN 978-1-60819-200-7.
