= Sidney Hemming =

Marine geologist

Sidney Ann Rasbury Hemming
- Education: State University of New York at Stony Brook
- Scientific career
- Workplaces: Lamont–Doherty Earth Observatory
- Thesis: Pb isotope studies of sedimentary rocks and detrital components for provenance analysis (1994)
- Doctoral advisor: Scott McLennan

Sidney Ann Rasbury Hemming is an analytical geochemist known for her work documenting Earth's history through analysis of sediments and sedimentary rocks. She is a professor of earth and environmental sciences at Columbia University.

== Education and career ==
Hemming earned a BS from Midwestern University in 1983 and an MS from Tulane University in 1986. In 1994 she earned her PhD from Stony Brook where she studied lead isotopes in sedimentary rocks. In 1994, Hemming started a postdoc with Wally Broecker at Lamont–Doherty Earth Observatory. As of 2021, Hemming is a professor of earth and environmental sciences at Lamont–Doherty Earth Observatory.

In 2018, Hemming was named a fellow of the American Geophysical Union who cited her "for the development of geochemical and isotopic tracers for sediments to reveal geological processes and events through Earth's history". In 2021, Hemming received a Guggenheim Fellowship which she plans to use to study the time period between the Pliocene and the Pleistocene.

== Research ==
Hemming's research documents Earth's historical changes through the analysis of chemical signals preserved in sedimentary rocks and sediments. She uses geochronology to obtain age estimates of events occurring in the ocean thereby tracking changes in water circulation, winds, and glaciers. She has used neodymium isotopes to track rapid changes in Antarctic Intermediate Water and changes in North Atlantic Deep Water. In the southern Ocean, Hemming has used strontium isotopes in sediments to track changes in the strength of the Agulhas current during the Last Glacial Maximum and constrained the location of the Antarctic Circumpolar Current. In California, her research on past climate conditions at Mono Lake revealed chemical signatures in the sediments recorded the Laschamp event, a global geomagnetic shift. In the North Atlantic Ocean, Hemming's research on Heinrich events has constrained the amount of ice-rafted debris moved by icebergs into the North Atlantic Ocean.

=== Selected publications ===
- McLennan, S.M.; Hemming, S. R.; McDaniel, D. K.; Hanson, G. N. (1993). "Geochemical approaches to sedimentation, provenance, and tectonics". In Johnsson, M. J.; Basu, A. (eds.). Processes controlling the Composition of Clastic Sediments. Vol. 284. Geological Society of America Special Paper. pp. 21–40. doi:10.1130/SPE284-P21. ISBN 9780813722849. S2CID 129996010.
- Rutberg, Randye L.; Hemming, Sidney R.; Goldstein, Steven L. (2000). "Reduced North Atlantic Deep Water flux to the glacial Southern Ocean inferred from neodymium isotope ratios". Nature. 405 (6789): 935–938. Bibcode:2000Natur.405..935R. doi:10.1038/35016049. ISSN 0028-0836. PMID 10879531. S2CID 205007120.
- Broecker, W. S.; Hemming, Sidney (December 14, 2001). "Climate Swings Come into Focus". Science. 294 (5550): 2308–2309. Bibcode:2001Sci...294.2308B. doi:10.1126/science.1068389. PMID 11743191. S2CID 129844023.
- Goldstein, S.L.; Hemming, S.R. (2003), "Long-lived Isotopic Tracers in Oceanography, Paleoceanography, and Ice-sheet Dynamics", Treatise on Geochemistry, vol. 6, Elsevier, pp. 453–489, Bibcode:2003TrGeo...6..453G, doi:10.1016/b0-08-043751-6/06179-x, ISBN 978-0-08-043751-4, S2CID 131959671
- Hemming, Sidney R. (2004). "Heinrich events: Massive late Pleistocene detritus layers of the North Atlantic and their global climate imprint". Reviews of Geophysics. 42 (1). Bibcode:2004RvGeo..42.1005H. doi:10.1029/2003RG000128. ISSN 1944-9208. S2CID 53526029.

== Awards and honors ==
- Fellow, American Geophysical Union (2018)
- Fellow, Geological Society of America (2018)
- Fellow, Geochemical Society (2020)
- Guggenheim Foundation Fellow (2021)
