= Greg Mullins =

Greg Mullins may refer to:

- Greg Mullins (baseball)
- Greg Mullins (firefighter)
