= Veena Sahajwalla =

Australian scientist and inventor

Veena Sahajwalla AO
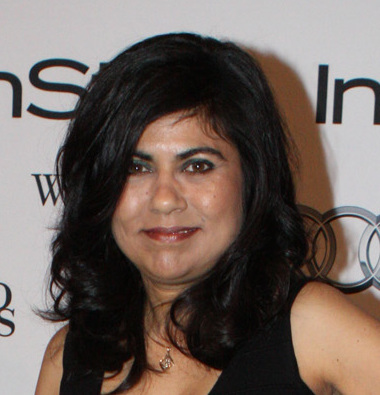
- Veena Sahajwalla (2013)
- Education: IIT Kanpur
- Occupations: Materials scientist, inventor
- Known for: 'Green Steel', 'Recycling science', 'Micro factories'
- Awards: Georgina Sweet Fellowship (2014); Celestino Eureka Prize for Promoting Understanding of Science (2022)
- Scientific career
- Fields: Materials science Metallurgy
- Workplaces: University of New South Wales

Veena Sahajwalla is an Indian-Australian inventor who is Professor of Materials Science in the Faculty of Science at the University of New South Wales, Australia. She is the Director of the UNSW SM@RT Centre for Sustainable Materials Research and Technology and an Australian Research Council Laureate Fellow.

Sahajwalla is known for her role as a councillor on the independent Australian Climate Council and as a judge on the ABC television show The New Inventors. Sahajwalla also served as a commissioner on the Australian Climate Commission. She featured in a 2008 episode of ABC's science show called Catalyst.

Sahajwalla was born in Mumbai, India. She studied for her master's degree in Vancouver, Canada before settling in Australia. While in Canada, she met and married her husband Rama Mahapatra. She was interviewed in 2025 on the Indian diaspora in Australia. The recording of this can be found at the National Library of Australia.

== Career and publications ==
Sahajwalla has been working as a professor at the University of New South Wales since 2008. She founded the Sustainable Materials Research and Technology (SMaRT) Lab at UNSW in 2008 which focused on recycling science and waste management.

Sahajwalla has been publishing scientific papers focusing on material engineering in journals since 1989. She has published over 380 peer-reviewed scientific papers with both the Indian Institute of Technology Kanpur where she completed her education and the University of New South Wales where she works.

Sahajwalla has also published many conference abstracts for international engineering and environmental conferences. She also has written and co-written many book chapters on the science of recycling including Unmaking Waste in Production and Consumption: Towards the Circular Economy.

== Green steel ==
Sahajwalla is well renowned for her contributions to building a waste-free economy. One of her most impactful projects was finding a cleaner alternative to using coal in the steel production industry. The process she created is called polymer injection technology, also known as green steel.

Sahajwalla discovered that recycled truck tires were a sustainable alternative to using coal as it was an environmentally friendly process that could prevent over 2 million tires from being diverted to landfills each year while simultaneously creating a renewable energy source. Tires could be ground into pellets and be used instead of coal as they released fewer greenhouse gases. Traditional steel making accounts for about 7% of global greenhouse gas emissions. Even though tires cannot be used as an alternative to all the coal used during production, they could substitute a percentage of the total coal consumed in the industry. This solution effectively lowered carbon emissions and prevented waste from being diverted towards landfills. This also will continue to be favorable as the world is rapidly de-carbonizing.

Sahajwalla has continued to work with Australian steel corporations OneSteel and MolyCop to further the development of polymer injection technology. Green Steel technology has now been implemented into global steel-making operations globally. This innovation has made Australia a leader in low-emission steel making.

The green steel movement has earned Sahajwalla many awards and grants which have aided her in continuing environmental research. This Project has also earned her international recognition which landed her positions on multiple government organizations focusing on climate change. Her green steel process has also been listed as one of the “innovations that could change the way we manufacture” by the US Society for Manufacturing Engineers in 2012. This innovation also won Sahajwalla the Australian Innovation Challenge in the same year. Her innovation in green steel technology also has earned her the 2019 BHERT (Business Higher Education Round Table) Award.

== Micro-factories ==
Sahajwalla is also known for innovating micro-factories. She discovered that small scale factories that were comprised one or more specialized machines were much more sustainable. Factories of this scale could be implemented in existing manufacturing businesses to recycle available waste.

She launched her first micro-factory at the Sustainable Materials Research and Technology (SMaRT) Lab based at the University of New South Wales Kensington Campus in 2018. Her first micro-factory was focused on recycling e-waste from old technology. She found that technological waste housed many precious metals and rare earth minerals. This micro-factory salvaged gold, electrical conductors, and many other rare materials. After collecting these materials, she processed them through thermal techniques so that they could be recycled in new technology. Glass and plastic used in electronics could also be melted down and used in industrial-grade ceramics and plastic filaments in 3D printing. This new concept revolutionized the recycling process for e-waste. Her contributions to this new e-waste recycling technology allowed her to continue to open new micro-factories targeted at recycling different materials.

Sahajwalla’s second micro-factory was launched in 2019 targeting the recycling of glass and textiles into green ceramics. Glass is one of the easiest materials to recycle but due to the expensive nature of recycling, many countries tend to stockpile it instead. This process is expensive due to the cross-contamination of glass with lids and labels. Sahajwalla's recycling method eliminates the need to separate these materials. Her ceramics are made of a blend of many different materials. This blend gives these ceramics strength and sound absorbency properties. These ceramics included tiles and furniture which can be used in new architectural developments. She has worked with numerous architectural firms to develop green buildings and infrastructure. Some projects that Sahajwalla has worked on include a Mirvac collaboration with Marrickville and Co., Hunters Hill library, and recycled rubbish bins for the city of Canberra.

These micro-factories have been successful in helping local and federal governments recycle materials that would otherwise be diverted to landfills. These micro-factories have created recycling factories for rural areas and have created jobs for many Australians. This is important as previously, waste in rural areas would have to travel to bigger cities to be recycled. This was not a sustainable practice because it produced unnecessary carbon emissions.

== Contributions to government organizations ==
Sahajwalla has been a member of the Australian Climate Council, NSW Circular and the Australian Climate Commission.

Sahajwalla is a councillor on the independent Australian Climate Council and has been awarded the Australian Research Council Laureate Fellowship & Georgina Sweet Award in 2014.

She was appointed director of the NSW Circular Economy Innovation Network in 2019 by the state government. NSW Circular is a government-funded body that aims to make NSW a zero-carbon circular economy. Sahajwalla manages the environmental efforts made by the organization and provides a face to the organization.

Sahajwalla was a commissioner on the Australian Climate commission alongside Professor Tim Flannery and Professor Will Steffen. The Australian Climate commission was responsible for releasing “reliable and autoreactive” information about climate change to the Australian public.

Sahajwalla also is the leader of the green manufacturing department of the ARC Industrial Transformation Research Hub. This department focuses on combining academic research with the Australian Industry to improve technology. This has ensured that the industry has the best research which has translated into environmental and economic benefits for the Australian economy.

== Recognition ==
Sahajwalla is one of Australia’s best-known engineers. She has been invited to talk at many international conferences including the Farm2Fork Summit in 2019, TRANSFORM conference in 2019, and the Falling Wall conference in 2018. Sahajwalla was also named one of Australia’s 100 most influential engineers as well as one of Australia’s most innovative engineers by Engineers Australia in 2015 and 2016 respectively.

Sahajwalla also runs a mentoring program for women in science called Science 50:50 with the Australian Research Council (ARC). This program aims to inspire Australian women to pursue degrees and careers in Science and Technology.

== Television appearances ==
- Sahajwalla appeared on ABC TV’s show “New Inventors” for several episodes as the residential engineer judge.
- She has also been featured on ABC’s “Australian story” which focused on her achievements and research since founding the Sustainable Materials Research and Technology Lab at UNSW.
- Sahajwalla was a guest panelist on ABC TV’s 2020 Q&A program which discussed the future of the world.
- Sahajwalla was featured in ABC TV’s show Catalyst in 2008.
- Sahajwalla presented a Ted Talk at the 2011 Sydney Event named Reviving Waste.

== Achievements ==
Known internationally as the inventor of green steel, Sahajwalla's research is recognized for changing the way the properties of carbon-bearing materials are understood, including coal, coke, graphite, plastics, and rubber. Sahajwalla's work has had a significant impact on the theory and practices that form the basis of operations of the iron-making, steel-making and ceramics industries. Of particular importance is her demonstration that waste plastics and waste rubber can be partial replacements for coal and coke in steel-making.

Sahajwalla’s research on the behavior of carbon at high temperatures has advanced the understanding of materials processing and offered industries more cost-effective ways to adopt sustainable and environmentally friendly production methods.

Sahajwalla has also revolutionized the methods of recycling in Australia. Her work to introduce small specialized recycling factories has significantly reduced carbon emissions and provided rural communities a way to up-cycle used items.

== Honours and awards ==
- 2005: winner, Eureka Prize for Scientific Research
- 2006: winner, Environmental Technology Award for her work in Engineering Sciences
- 2008: winner, NSW Scientist of the Year for Engineering Sciences by the NSW Government Office of the Chief Scientist
- 2011: winner, Nokia Business Innovation Award, presented at the Telstra Business Women's Awards
- 2011: winner, Pravasi Bharatiya Samman Award by the Government of India
- 2012: winner, Banksia Environmental Foundation GE Innovation Award
- 2012: winner, Australian Innovation Challenge in recognition of her revolutionary work turning recycled rubber tires into steel.
- 2013: winner, AIST Howe Memorial Lecture award.
- 2014: winner, Georgina Sweet Australian Laureate Fellowship by the Australian Research Council.
- 2015: winner, Innovation category in the Australian 100 Women of Influence 2015.
- 2016: finalist, NSW Premier's Award for Woman of the Year.
- 2018: elected Fellow of the Australian Academy of Science (FAA)
- 2019: winner, BHERT (Business Higher Education Round Table) Award for her Green Steel innovation
- 2022: winner, NSW Australian of the Year
- 2022: winner, Celestino Eureka Prize for Promoting Understanding of Science
- 2023: winner, Women in Design Award as part of Australian Good Design Awards
- 2025: appointed Officer of the Order of Australia in the Australia Day Honours.
