= Lesley Ann Hughes =

Australian academic and climate scientist

Lesley Ann Hughes is an Australian academic and climate scientist. Hughes is Distinguished Professor of Biology and Pro Vice-Chancellor (Research Integrity and Development) at Macquarie University. She is also Director, Biodiversity Node, at the NSW Office of Environment & Heritage Climate Adaptation Research Hub and a Councillor at the independent Climate Council. From 2011 to 2013, she was a Commissioner of the Australian Government’s Climate Commission (established by the Gillard government in 2011 but abolished by the Abbott government in 2013). Hughes was one of five Australian Lead Authors who worked on the Intergovernmental Panel on Climate Change (IPCC) Fourth & Fifth Assessment Reports in 2007. She works at the Centre for Smart Green Cities. Upon accepting her leadership award in 2019, Hughes spoke on having hope and optimism in the face of climate change. She listed her reasons as: money, technology, governments, the law, people power, and children. Her full speech can be found at the Australian Museum blog website.

== Career ==
Hughes’ research has mainly focused on the impacts of climate change on species and ecosystems. She graduated from the University of Sydney in 1981 with a Bachelor of Science (First Class Honours) before completing a PhD at Macquarie University in 1990. Hughes’ previous roles include Head of the Department of Biological Sciences at Macquarie University (2009-2011); Chair of the Tasmanian Climate Action Council (2012-2014); Co-director of the Climate Futures Research Centre at Macquarie University (2012-2014) and Co-convenor of the Terrestrial Biodiversity Adaptation Research Network for National Climate Change Adaptation Research Facility (2009-2013).

Hughes has been a Climate Councillor with the Climate Council, Australia's leading climate change communications organisation, since 2013. She regularly co-authors reports on climate change and its impacts, and is a frequent commentator in the media.

== Gender equity and women in STEM ==
Hughes has a history of advocating for women in science, giving talks and participating in women in science and women in climate science events, in addition to working on the science and gender equity Athena Swan program at her university. She is also renowned for standing up to politicians and their scepticism against scientific evidence.

== Published works ==
=== Book chapters ===
- Hughes L (2014)10 things to do about climate change. In: Ten Commitments Revisited: Securing Australia’s Environment. (eds Lindenmayer D, Dovers S, Morton S), pp217-226. Second Edition. CSIRO Publishing, Canberra.
- Reisinger A, Kitching R, Chiew F, Hughes L, Newton P, Schuster S, Tait A, Whetton P. (2014) Chapter 25: Australasia. In: Intergovernmental Panel on Climate Change Fifth Assessment Report, Working Group II, Impacts, Adaptation & Vulnerability. IPCC, Geneva
- Cabrelli A, Beaumont L, Hughes L (2015) "The Impacts of Climate Change on Australian and New Zealand Flora and Fauna". In: Austral Ark: The State of Wildlife in Australia and New Zealand (eds Stow A, Maclean N, Holwell GI), pp 65-82. Cambridge University Press, United Kingdom.

=== Journal articles ===
- Roger, Erin; Duursma, Daisy Englert; Downey, Paul O.; Gallagher, Rachael V.; Hughes, Lesley; Steel, Jackie; Johnson, Stephen B.; Leishman, Michelle R. (August 2015). "A tool to assess potential for alien plant establishment and expansion under climate change". Journal of Environmental Management. 159: 121–127. Bibcode:2015JEnvM.159..121R. doi:10.1016/j.jenvman.2015.05.039. PMID 26063516.
- Harris, Rebecca M.B.; McQuillan, Peter; Hughes, Lesley (August 2015). "The effectiveness of common thermo-regulatory behaviours in a cool temperate grasshopper". Journal of Thermal Biology. 52: 75–83. Bibcode:2015JTBio..52...75H. doi:10.1016/j.jtherbio.2015.06.001. PMID 26267501.
- Cabrelli, Abigail L.; Hughes, Lesley (25 February 2015). "Assessing the vulnerability of Australian skinks to climate change". Climatic Change. 130 (2): 223–233. Bibcode:2015ClCh..130..223C. doi:10.1007/s10584-015-1358-6. S2CID 153428168.
- Nooten, Sabine S; Hughes, Lesley (November 2016). "Roles of family and architecture in driving insect community structure: a comparison of nine Australian plant species". Austral Entomology. 55 (4): 423–432. doi:10.1111/aen.12205. S2CID 87485786.
- Nooten, Sabine S.; Hughes, Lesley (27 July 2017). "The power of the transplant: direct assessment of climate change impacts". Climatic Change. 144 (2): 237–255. Bibcode:2017ClCh..144..237N. doi:10.1007/s10584-017-2037-6. S2CID 90593137.
- López-Cubillos, Sofía; Hughes, Lesley (20 November 2016). "Effects of elevated carbon dioxide (CO2) on flowering traits of three horticultural plant species". Australian Journal of Crop Science. 10 (11): 1523–1528. doi:10.21475/ajcs.2016.10.11.PNE46.

== Science communication ==
Hughes has worked extensively on communicating the science of climate change around Australia. In her acceptance speech for the 2019 Australian Museum Research Institute Lifetime Achievement Award, she listed "six reasons for hope in the face of climate change". Number 6 was 'Kids', and the school strike for climate started by Greta Thunberg:

Greta’s urging that schoolkids should strike for climate action has been a global phenomenon. Last March, an estimated 1.5 million students in more than 100 countries around the world joined her call. In July, the secretary general of OPEC, the Organization of Petroleum Exporting Countries declared Thunberg, and other young climate activists as the "greatest threat" to the fossil fuel industry. I’m sure they took this as a great compliment!".

Her work has been published in The Monthly, describing the balance between the depression of climate change, while trying to maintain optimism, in an article titled "When planetary catastrophe is your day job". Hughes has also published on how individual cities are leading climate policy, in the absence of national leadership in climate change. She has also contributed an article to The Conversation about the impacts of climate change on human health, in 2011, citing that this is the most important decade to act to prevent significant impacts to human health:

There will also be economic impacts of rising temperatures via the impact on occupational health. People who work outside, in unventilated environments, in mines and agricultural industries, for example, are vulnerable to the impacts of excessive heat. Any increase in the number of days lost due to heat will have an impact on productivity, with flow-on impacts to the economy.

In June 2019 she spoke at a "women in science" event at the Sydney Mechanics School of Art on climate change.

== Awards ==
- In 2019 she was awarded the Australian Museum Research Institute (AMRI) Lifetime Achievement Award for her contribution to climate change communication as well as researching the impact on Australian plants and animals. She was described as a "pioneering ecologist' and a leading figure in international climate change research, for her leadership in climate change and ecological research.
- In 2014, Hughes was awarded the "Australian Museum Eureka Prize for Promoting Understanding of Australian Science Research".

Hughes publications can be found at ORCID.
