= Will Steffen =

Climate scientist (1947–2023)

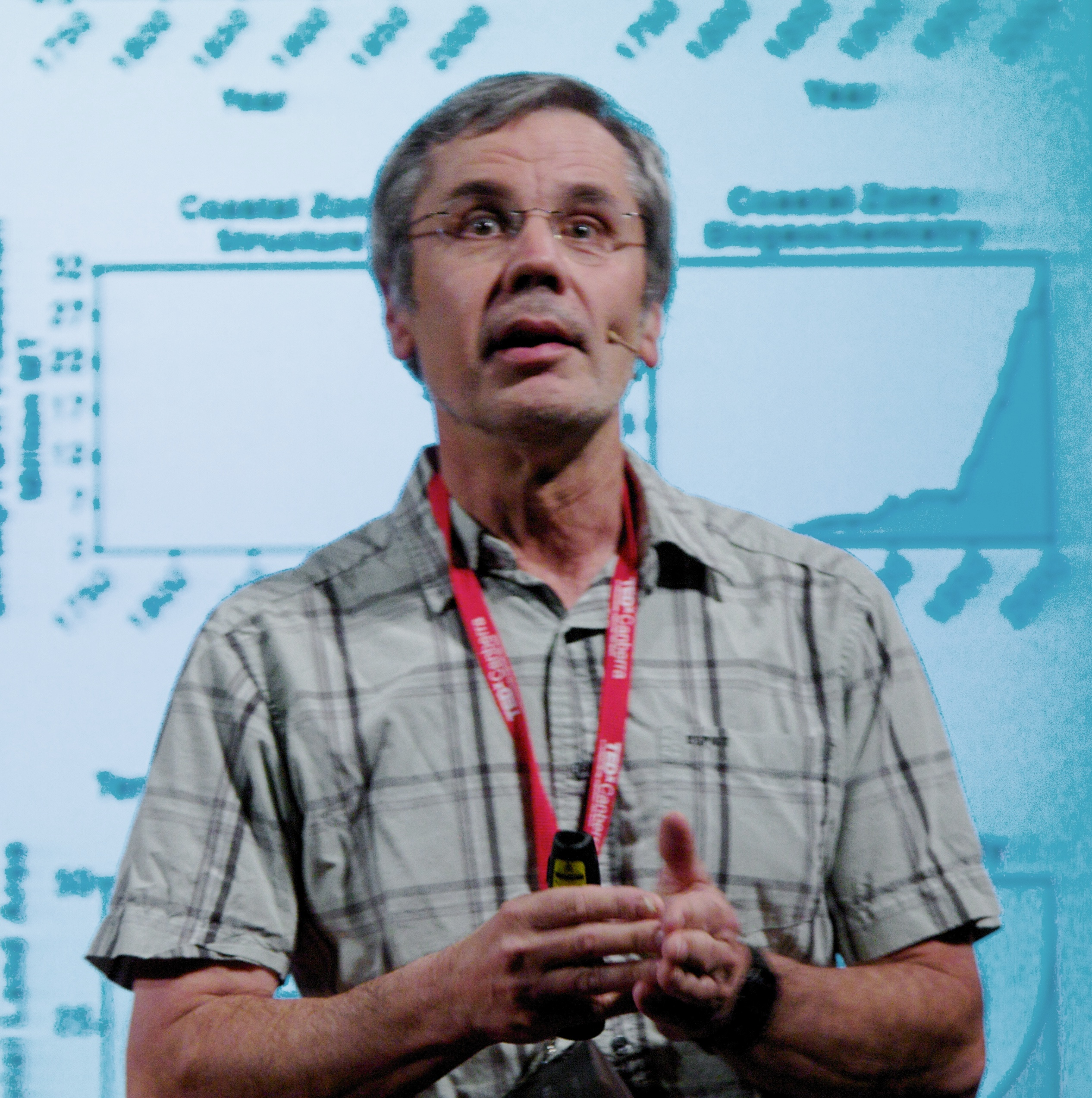
- Steffen in 2010
- Born: William Lee Steffen; 25 June 1947; Norfolk, Nebraska, U.S.
- Died: 29 January 2023 (aged 75); Canberra, Australia
- Education: University of Florida (PhD, MSc); University of Missouri (BSc)
- Known for: Advocating with Paul Crutzen the concept of the Anthropocene; initiating with Johan Rockström the international debate on planetary boundaries
- Spouse: Carrie Steffen
- Children: 1
- Scientific career
- Fields: Climate science
- Workplaces: Climate Change Institute at the Australian National University; Climate Council
- Website: www.climatecouncil.org.au/author/will-steffen/

William Lee Steffen (25 June 1947 – 29 January 2023) was an American-born Australian chemist. He was the executive director of the Australian National University (ANU) Climate Change Institute and a member of the Australian Climate Commission until its dissolution in September 2013. From 1998 to 2004, he was the executive director of the International Geosphere-Biosphere Programme, a coordinating body of national environmental change organisations based in Stockholm. Steffen was one of the founding climate councillors of the Climate Council, with whom he frequently co-authored reports, and spoke in the media on issues relating to climate change and renewable energy.

== Life and career ==
Will Steffen was born in Norfolk, Nebraska, on 25 June 1947. Steffen completed a BSc in industrial chemistry from the University of Missouri in 1970. The University of Florida awarded him an MSc in education in 1972 and a PhD in chemistry in 1975. He is widely published on climate science. His research interests ranged over climate change and Earth system science, with a focus on sustainability. He wrote on adapting land use to climate change, bringing human processes into the modelling and analysis of the Earth system, and the history of and future prospects for the relationship between the natural world and humans. Steffen was also prominent advocating along with Paul Crutzen the concept of the Anthropocene, and initiating along with Johan Rockström an international debate on planetary boundaries and the "safe operating space" for humanity and in 2018 on the possibility of uncontrolled climate evolution, which stirred considerable scientific debate (Hothouse Earth).

Steffen served as science adviser to the Australian Department of Climate Change and Energy Efficiency. He was a member of the advisory board of the Australian Bureau of Meteorology and worked with the Prime Minister's Science, Engineering and Innovation Council. He was also on an advisory panel in Colorado with the National Center for Atmospheric Research.

Steffen was on the Science Advisory Committee of the APEC Climate Centre in Korea. He was honorary professor at the Copenhagen University's Department of Geography and Geology and visiting researcher at the Stockholm Resilience Centre. He was the chair of the Federal Government's Antarctic Science Advisory Committee, and advised the Australian Government in further roles as scientific adviser to the Department of Climate Change and Energy Efficiency and as expert adviser to the Multi-Party Climate Change Committee. Steffen also sat on the Australian Climate Commission.

In 2011, he was the principal author of a government climate report, The Critical Decade, which advocated that a tax should be placed on carbon.

The Australian Climate Commission was dissolved in 2013. Steffen reflected, "I think we were the first definitive action of the Abbott government. They got rid of us and you could probably measure it in hours rather than days." Steffen, along with other dismissed commissioners such as professor Tim Flannery, professor Lesley Ann Hughes, and CEO Amanda McKenzie, launched a new independent organisation — the Climate Council — in Australia's largest crowdfunding, raising over $1 million in one week. Steffen remained a climate councillor with the Climate Council.

In 2018, he was an author of the Special Report on Global Warming of 1.5 °C published by the IPCC.

Steffen died from pancreatic cancer in Canberra on 29 January 2023, at age 75. He was married to Carrie for 51 years, and they had a daughter named Sonja.

== Some publications ==
- Steffen, Will; et al. (2018). "Trajectories of the Earth System in the Anthropocene". Proceedings of the National Academy of Sciences. 115 (33): 8252–8259. Bibcode:2018PNAS..115.8252S. doi:10.1073/pnas.1810141115. PMC 6099852. PMID 30082409.
- Waters, Colin N., et al. (2016) The Anthropocene is functionally and stratigraphically distinct from the Holocene. In: Science 351, No. 6269 doi:10.1126/science.aad2622.
- Steffen W et al., (2015) Planetary boundaries: Guiding human development on a changing planet. In: Science 349, No. 6254, pp. 1286–1287, doi:10.1126/science.1259855.
- Steffen, Will; Rockström, Johan; Costanza, Robert (2011). "How defining planetary boundaries can transform our approach to growth". Solutions. 2 (3). Archived from the original on 4 July 2011.
- Steffen W, Grinevald J, Crutzen P and McNeill J (2011) "The Anthropocene: conceptual and historical perspectives" Archived 19 January 2012 at the Wayback Machine Philosophical Transactions of the Royal Society A 369(1938): 842–867. doi:10.1098/rsta.2010.0327
- Steffen W (ed.) (2010) Australia's Biodiversity and Climate Change Csiro Publishing. ISBN 978-0-643-09605-9.
- Zalasiewicz J, Williams M, Steffen W and Crutzen P (2010) "The new world of the Anthropocene" Archived 2 October 2011 at the Wayback Machine Environmental Science & Technology, 44(7): 2228–2231. doi:10.1021/es903118j
- Steffen W (2008) "Looking Back to the Future" Ambio, 37(14): 507–513. doi:10.1579/0044-7447-37.sp14.507
- Steffen W, Crutzen P, McNeill J and Hibbard KA (2008) "Stages of the Anthropocene: Assessing the Human Impact on the Earth System" American Geophysical Union, Annual Meeting 2008, abstract #GC22B-01.
- Robin L and Steffen W (2007) "History for the Anthropocene" History Compass, 5(5): 1694–1719. doi:10.1111/j.1478-0542.2007.00459.x
- Costanza R, Graumlich L and Steffen W (eds) (2007) Integrated History and Future of People on Earth MIT Press. ISBN 978-0-262-03366-4.
- Steffen, W (2005) Global Change and the Earth System: A Planet Under Pressure Birkhäuser. ISBN 978-3-540-26594-8.
- Gordon LJ, Steffen W, Jönsson BF, Folke C, Falkenmark M and Johannessen Å (2005) "Human modification of global water vapor flows from the land surface" Proceedings of the National Academy of Sciences (USA), 102: 7612–7617.
- Steffen W, Andreae MO, Bolin B, Cox P, Crutzen PJ, Cubasch U, Nakicenovic N, Talaue-McManus L and Turner II BL (2004) "Group Report: Earth system dynamics in the Anthropocene" In: Schellnhuber H-J, Earth system analysis for sustainability, pages 313–340, MIT Press, ISBN 978-0-262-19513-3.
- Steffen W, Andreae MO, Bolin B, Crutzen PJ, Cox P, Cubasch U, Held H, Nakicenovic N, Scholes R, Talaue-McManus L and Turner II BL (2004) "Abrupt changes: the Achilles heels of the Earth System" Environment, 46(3): 9–20.
- Steffen W and Lambin E (2004) "Earth System Functioning in the Anthropocene: Human Impacts on the Global Environment" Pages 112–144 in: Interactions between global change and human health, Working group 2004, Pontificiae Academiae Scientiarum, Scripta Varia 106. ISBN 978-88-7761-085-0.
- Crutzen P and Steffen W (2003) "How Long Have We Been in the Anthropocene Era?" Climatic Change, Editorial Comment.61(3): 251–257. doi:10.1023/B:CLIM.0000004708.74871.62
