= Per Espen Stoknes =

Norwegian psychologist and politician

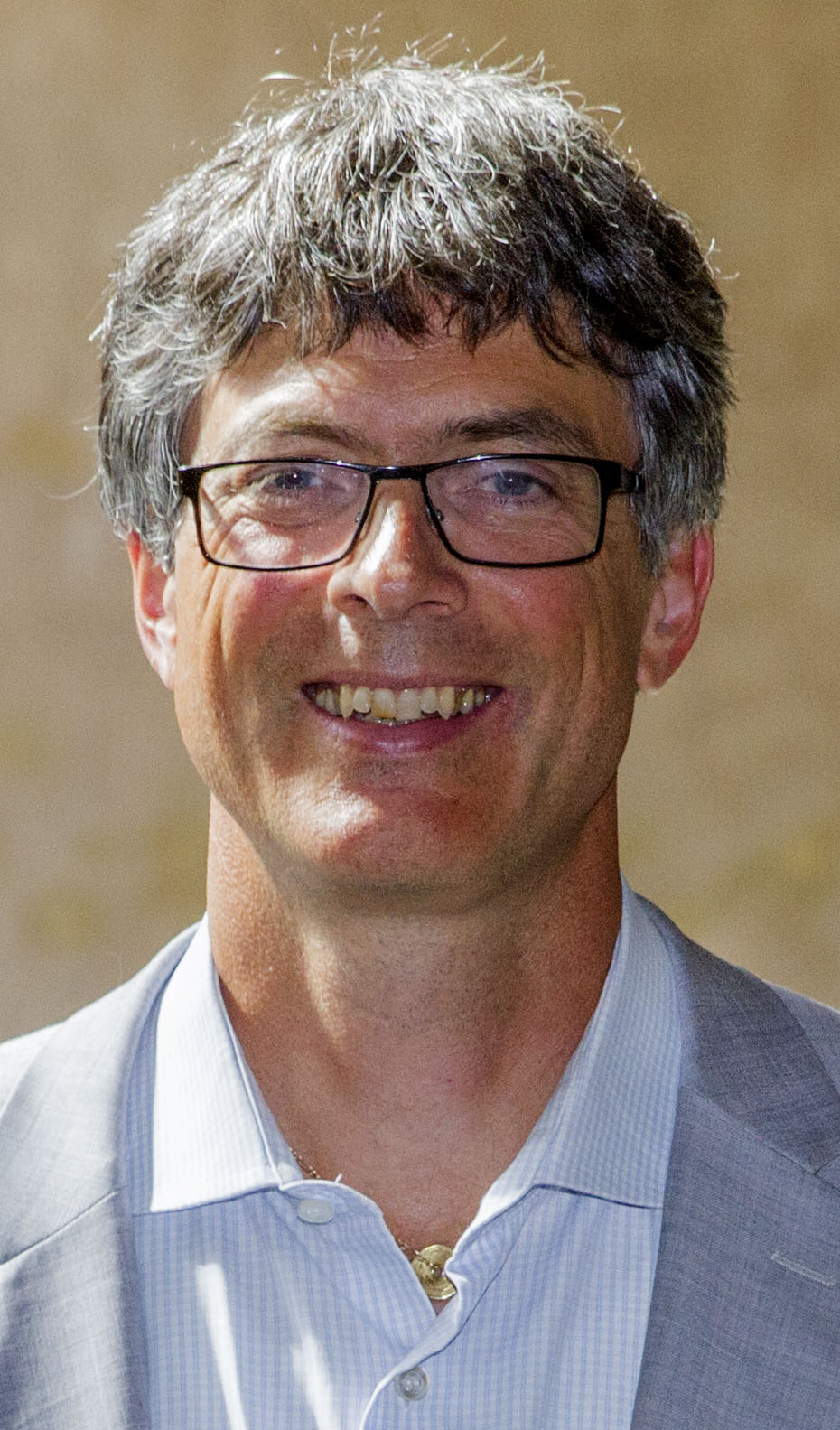

Deputy representative to the Parliament of Norway from Oslo
- In office 2017–2021

Personal details
- Born: 9 March 1967 (age 59)
- Party: Green Party
- Education: University of Oslo
- Occupation: psychologist and politician

Per Espen Stoknes (born 9 March 1967) is a Norwegian psychologist and politician for the Green Party. He is well known for his TED talk explaining the psychology of economic choices for climate change. Stoknes advocates for climate communication strategies which break down barriers and invite the public to Individual and political action on climate change.

He served as a deputy representative to the Parliament of Norway from Oslo during the term 2017–2021.

Stoknes received his PhD in economics from the University of Oslo. Stoknes was also a professor and director of the Center for Green Growth at the Norwegian Business School in Oslo.

== Publications ==
- Per Espen Stoknes: Money & Soul: A New Balance Between Finance and Feelings. UIT Cambridge Ltd., 2009, ISBN 1900322463
- Per Espen Stoknes: What We Think About When We Try Not To Think About Global Warming: Toward a New Psychology of Climate Action. Chelsea Green Publishing, 2015, ISBN 9781603585835.
- Per Espen Stoknes: Science Based Activism. Fagbokforlaget, 2015, ISBN 9788245018660.
