= Climate communication =

Environmental and science communication

A warming stripes graphic portraying global warming since 1850 as a series of color-coded stripes in which blue (= cool years) progresses over time to red (= warm years). Climatologist Ed Hawkins designed the graphic purposely devoid of scientific notation to be quickly understandable by non-scientists.

Climate communication or climate change communication is a field of environmental communication and science communication focused on discussing the causes, nature and effects of anthropogenic climate change.

Research in the field emerged in the 1990s and has since grown and diversified to include studies concerning the media, conceptual framing, and public engagement and response. Since the late 2000s, a growing number of studies have been conducted in countries in the Global South and have been focused on climate communication with marginalized populations.

Most research focuses on raising public knowledge and awareness, understanding underlying cultural values and emotions, and bringing about public engagement and action. Major issues include familiarity with the audience, barriers to public understanding, creating change, audience segmentation, changing rhetoric, public health, storytelling, media coverage, and popular culture.

== History ==
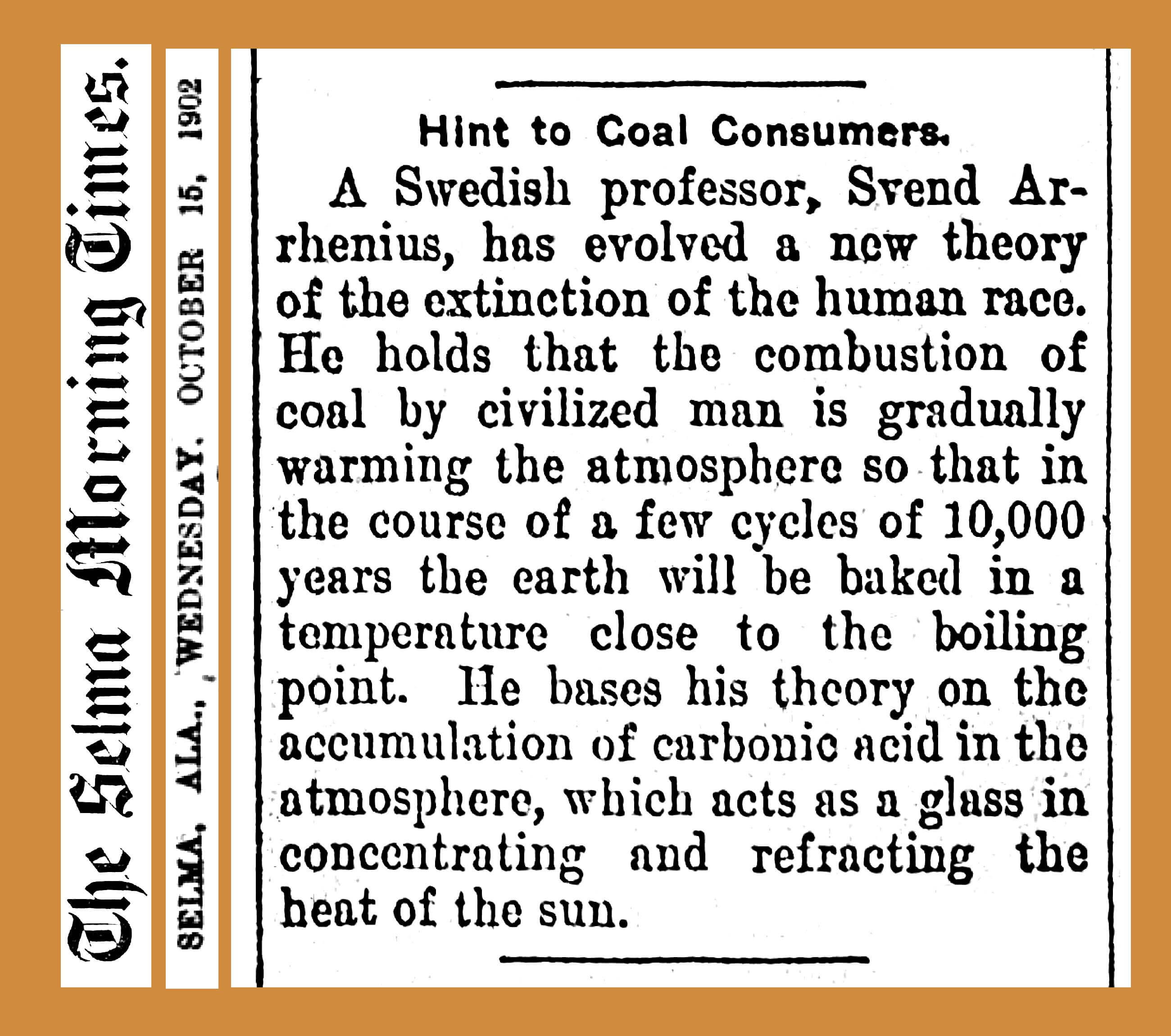
This 1902 newspaper article attributes to Swedish Nobel laureate (chemistry) Svante Arrhenius a theory that coal combustion could cause a degree of global warming that could eventually lead to human extinction.

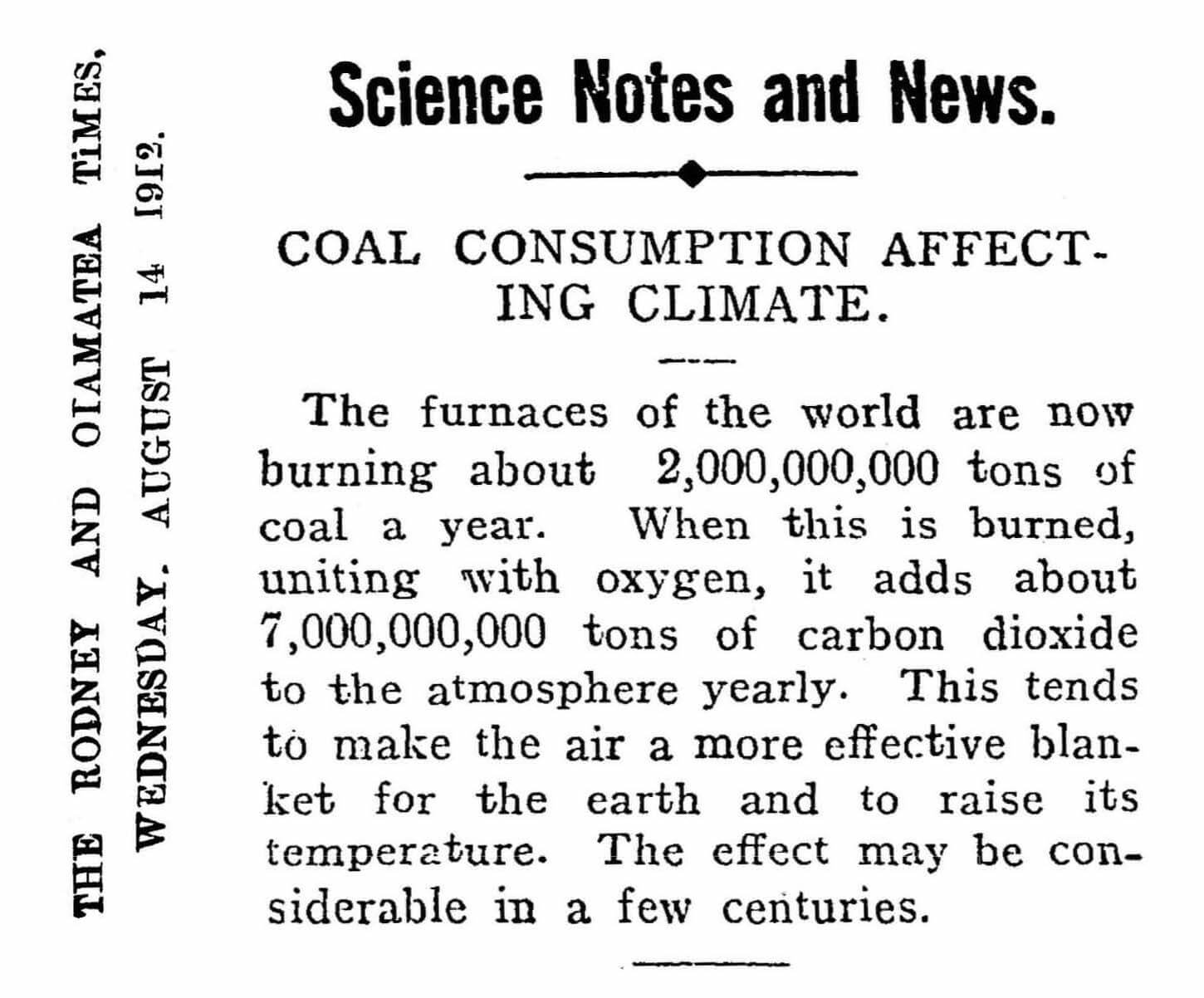
This 1912 article, from an earlier Popular Mechanics article, succinctly describes the greenhouse effect to the public, focusing on how burning coal creates carbon dioxide that causes climate change.

Scholar Amy E. Chadwick identifies Climate Change Communication as a new field of scholarship that truly emerged in the 1990s. In the late 80s and early 90s, research in developed countries (e.g. the United States, New Zealand, and Sweden) was largely concerned with studying the public's perception and comprehension of climate change science, models, and risks and guiding further development of communication strategies. These studies showed that while the public was aware of and beginning to notice climate change effects (increasing temperatures and changing precipitation patterns), the public's understanding of climate change was interlinked with ozone depletion and other environmental risks but not human-produced CO_{2} emissions. This understanding was coupled with varied yet overall increased net concern that continued through the mid-2000s.

In studies from the mid-2000s to the late 2000s, there is evidence of rising global skepticism despite growing consensus and evidence of increasingly polarized views due to climate change's growing use as a political "litmus test". In 2010, researcher Susanne C. Moser viewed both the expansion of climate change communication's focus, which began to include subjects such as materialized evidence of climate change effects in addition to science and policy, as well as more prolific conversation/communication from a variety of voices as increasing climate change's relevance to society. Surveys through the mid-2010s showed mixed concern for climate change depending on global region —notably consistent concern in developed Western countries but a trend towards global unconcern in countries such as China, Mexico, and Kenya.

In 2016, Moser noted an increase in the total number of climate communication studies in both Westernized countries and the Global South and an increased focus on climate communication with indigenous peoples and other marginalized communities since 2010. As of 2017, research remained focused on public understanding and had since begun to also analyze the relevance of the media, conceptual framing, public engagement and response, and persuasive strategies. This expansion has legitimated climate change communication as its own academic field and has yielded a group of experts specific to it.

== Primary goals of climate communication ==
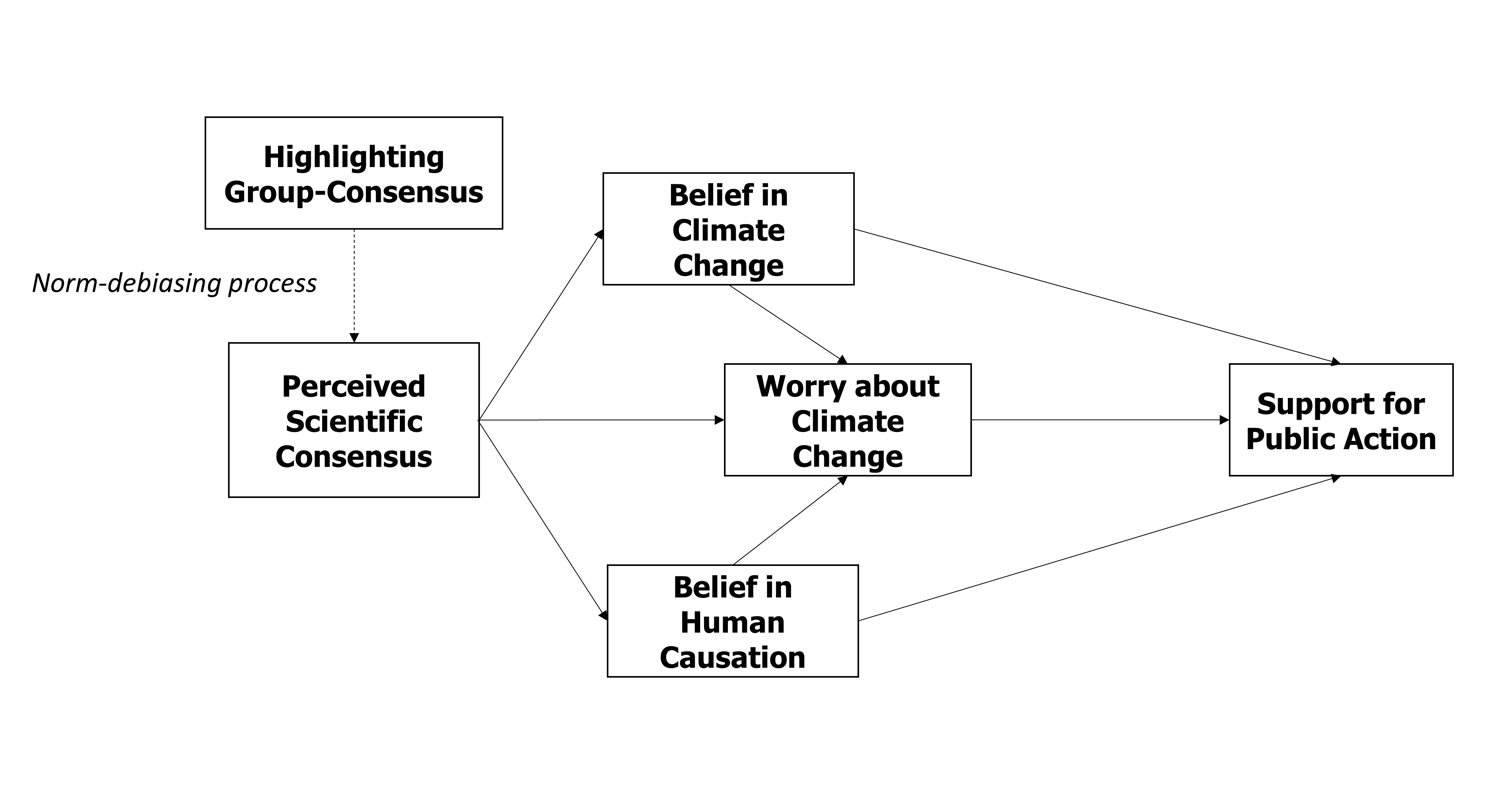
The Gateway Belief Model, which models the thought that communicating scientific consensus will impact belief in climate change and produce support for action

Most climate communication and research within the field is concerned with (1) the mechanisms related to the public's understanding/awareness of and perception of climate change which are intertwined with (2) personal cultural values and emotions related to social norms and (3) how these components can influence the engagement and action that may emerge as a response to communication.

Within the academic field, there are debates over which is more important: knowledge-based communication or emotion-driven communication. Though both are inherently linked to action, researchers often view increased understanding as leading to increased action. A 2020 study by Kris De Meyer et al. attempts to push back against that notion and argues that action produces belief.

=== Analyzing and increasing public understanding and perception ===
One line of climate communication study is concerned with analyzing public understanding and risk perception. Understanding public perception of risk and its relevant influences, as well as public knowledge, concern, consensus, and imagery is thought to help policymakers better address the concerns of constituents and inform further climate communication. This notion has opened the realm of climate communications to political communications, sociology, and psychology.

Achieving increased public understanding is often associated with communicating levels of scientific consensus and other scientific facts or futures in order to spur action and address the "information-deficit" model but can also be related to connecting with values and emotions. Perception is often related to personal recognition to impacted locations, times (the present vs. the future), weather events, or economics, which has placed emphasis on different methods of framing (linking concepts) and rhetoric when communicating. Connection of the self with events, such as those mentioned and often times through perceiving problems as local, increases recognition of the larger problem of climate change. These methods of communication presently include scientific communication, knowledge transfer, social media, news media, and entertainment amongst others, which are also studied individually regarding climate change.

Some experts focus on how public perceptions of climate change can be related to public perceptions of smaller parts of the environment. Through teaching about the interconnectedness of humans and nature, some environmental writers believe that a fundamental shift in thinking is possible, and that this in turn would lead to greater desire to preserve the natural world.

=== Connecting to values and emotions ===
In addition to studies regarding knowledge, climate communication researchers inspect existing values and emotions related to climate change and how they are impacted by various communication strategies and can influence the effects of communication modes. Understanding and relating to the audiences' moral, cultural, religious, and political values, identities, and emotions (like fear) are viewed as imperative to appropriate and effective communication because climate change can otherwise seem intangible due to uncertainty and distance (physical, social, temporal). Recognizing and understanding these values is key to impacting perception of climate science and mitigative action because values serve as filters through which information is processed. Emotional reactions to climate change and the role emotions can play in decision-making have encouraged researchers to study the emotional side of climate change. Appeals to emotions (such as fear and hope) and to values can also be used in communication strategies. It is unclear whether negative emotions (e.g. concern and fear) or positive emotions (e.g. hope) better promote climate change action. Emotions can also be analyzed by their level of pleasantness and/or to the extent they evoke action, which is often understudied.

Instead of warning of global warming's impending negative impacts, some renewable energy lobbyists emphasize economic benefits, profitability, job creation, and energy dominance—items that fossil fuel advocates have traditionally touted. The goal was to "harness" self-interest rather than condemn it, and to "meet the audience where they are".

=== Producing engagement and action ===
Presenting data and other facts is less effective in motivating people to act to mitigate climate change, than financial incentives and social pressure involved in showing people climate-related actions of other people.

The strongest factors in self-reported changes in opinion about global warming were Republican party identification, seeing others experience impacts of global warming, and learning more about global warming.

Studying climate communications can also be focused on civic engagement and the production of behavior changes for adapting or increasing resiliency to climate change. Engagement and action can occur on multiple geographic scales (local, regional, national, or international), and examples include participation in climate justice movements, support for policies or politics, changes to agricultural practices, and addresses to vulnerabilities to extreme weather vulnerabilities. Behavioral changes can also address more fundamental norms and values that influence lifestyles, life choices, and society as a whole. Engagement can also involve how those who communicate climate change interact with researchers studying the field of communications.

Studies have recognized that increased understanding and perception does not automatically produce action and have argued for increased means of enabling action in communication methods. Research into engagement and action often focuses on the perception and understanding of different demographics and geographic locations. Some politicians, such as Arnold Schwarzenegger with his slogan "terminate pollution", say that activists should generate optimism by focusing on the health co-benefits of climate action.

A study published in Nature Human Behaviour in 2025 found that presenting people with binary climate data—for example, a lake freezing versus not freezing—significantly increases the perceived impact of climate change compared to when continuous data such as temperature change is presented. The researchers said the findings confirmed the boiling frog effect for climate change communication.

== Major issues ==
=== Barriers to understanding ===
A 2022 study found that the public substantially underestimates the degree of scientific consensus that humans are causing climate change. Studies from 2019 to 2021 found scientific consensus to range from 98.7–100%.

Research found that 80–90% of Americans underestimate the prevalence of support for major climate change mitigation policies and climate concern. While 66–80% Americans support these policies, Americans estimate the prevalence to be 37–43%. Researchers have called this misperception a false social reality, a form of pluralistic ignorance.

National political divides on the seriousness of climate change consistently correlate with political ideology, with right-wing opinion being more negative.

Climate communications is heavily focused on methods for inviting larger scale public action to address climate change. To this end, a lot of research focuses on barriers to public understanding and action on climate change. Scholarly evidence shows that the information deficit model of communication—where climate change communicators assume "if the public only knew more about the evidence they would act"—doesn't work. Instead, argumentation theory indicates that different audiences need different kinds of persuasive argumentation and communication. This is counter to many assumptions made by other fields such as psychology, environmental sociology, and risk communication.

Additionally, climate denialism by organizations, such as The Heartland Institute in the United States, and individuals introduces misinformation into public discourse and understanding.

There are several models for explaining why the public doesn't act once more informed. One of the theoretical models for this is the 5 Ds model created by Per Epsten Stoknes. Stoknes describes 5 major barriers to creating action from climate communication:

1. Distance – many effects and impacts of climate change feel distant from individual lives
2. Doom - when framed as a disaster, the message backfires, causing Eco-anxiety
3. Dissonance – a disconnect between the problems (mainly the fossil fuel economy) and the things that people choose in their lives
4. Denial -- psychological self defense to avoid becoming overwhelmed by fear or guilt
5. iDentity -- disconnects created by social identities, such as conservative values, which are threatened by the changes that need to happen because of climate change.

In her book Living in Denial: Climate Change, Emotions, and Everyday Life, Kari Norgaard's study of Bygdaby—a fictional name used for a real city in Norway—found that non-response was much more complex than just a lack of information. In fact, too much information can do the exact opposite because people tend to neglect global warming once they realize there is no easy solution. When people understand the complexity of the issue, they can feel overwhelmed and helpless which can lead to apathy or skepticism.

A study published in PLOS Climate studied defensive and secure forms of national identity—respectively called "national narcissism" (Note: Cislak et al. define National Narcissism as "a belief that one's national group is exceptional and deserves external recognition underlain by unsatisfied psychological needs".) and "secure national identification" (Note: Cislak et al. define Secure National Identification as "reflect(ing) feelings of strong bonds and solidarity with one's ingroup members, and sense of satisfaction in group membership".)—for their correlation to support for policies to mitigate climate change and to transition to renewable energy. The researchers concluded that secure national identification tends to support policies promoting renewable energy; however, national narcissism was found to be inversely correlated with support for such policies—except to the extent that such policies, as well as greenwashing, enhance the national image. Right-wing political orientation, which may indicate susceptibility to climate conspiracy beliefs, was also concluded to be negatively correlated with support for genuine climate mitigation policies.

A study published in PLOS One in 2024 found that even a single repetition of a claim was sufficient to increase the perceived truth of both climate science-aligned claims and climate change skeptic/denial claims—"highlighting the insidious effect of repetition". This effect was found even among climate science endorsers.

==== Climate literacy ====
Changes in interest in climate change, as measured by use of "climate change" as a Google search term

Though communicating the science about climate change under the premises of an Information deficit model of communication is not very effective in creating change, comfort with and literacy in the main issues and topics of climate change is important for changing public opinion and action. Several agencies and educational organizations have developed frameworks and tools for developing climate literacy, including the Climate Literacy Lab at Georgia State university, and National Oceanic and Atmospheric Administration. Such resources in English have been collected by the Climate Literacy and Awareness Network.

=== Creating change ===
As of 2008, most of the environmental communications evidence for effecting individual or social change were focused on behavior changes around: household energy consumption, recycling behaviours, changing transportation behavior and buying green products. At that time, there were few examples of multi-level communications strategies for effecting change.

==== Behaviour change ====
Since much of Climate communication is focused on engaging broad public action, much of the studies are focused on effecting behavior change. Typically, effective climate communication has three parts: cognitive, affective and place based appeals.

=== Audience segmentation ===
The sharp divide over the existence of and responsibility for global warming and climate change falls largely along political lines. Overall, 60% of Americans surveyed said oil and gas companies were "completely or mostly responsible" for climate change.

Opinion about human causation of climate change increased substantially with education among Democrats, but not among Republicans. Conversely, opinions favoring becoming carbon neutral declined substantially with age among Republicans, but not among Democrats.

Perceptions differ along political lines, on whether climate change was a "major factor" contributing to various extreme weather events experienced by respondents.

Democrats and Republicans have long differed in views of the importance of addressing climate change, with the gap widening in the 2010s and Democrats three times as likely to view global warming as human-caused.

Different parts of different populations respond differently to climate change communication. Academic research since 2013 has seen an increasing number of audience segmentation studies, to understand different tactics for reaching different parts of populations. It involves the identification of homogenous subgroups within an audience or target population with same demographic or psychological profiles, or both. It enables targeted messages for each subgroup for efficient communication. Major segmentation studies include:

- US Segmentation of the American audiences into 6 groups: Alarmed, Concerned, Cautious, Disengaged, Doubtful and Dismissive.
- AUS Segmentation of Australians into 4 segments in 2011, and 6 segments analogous to the Six America's model.
- DE Segmentation of German populations into 5 segments
- India Segmentation of Indian populations into the 6 segments
- Singapore Segmentation of Singapore audiences into 3 segments
- France Segmentation of France audiences intro 6 segments mixing climate attitudes and values.

=== Changing rhetoric ===
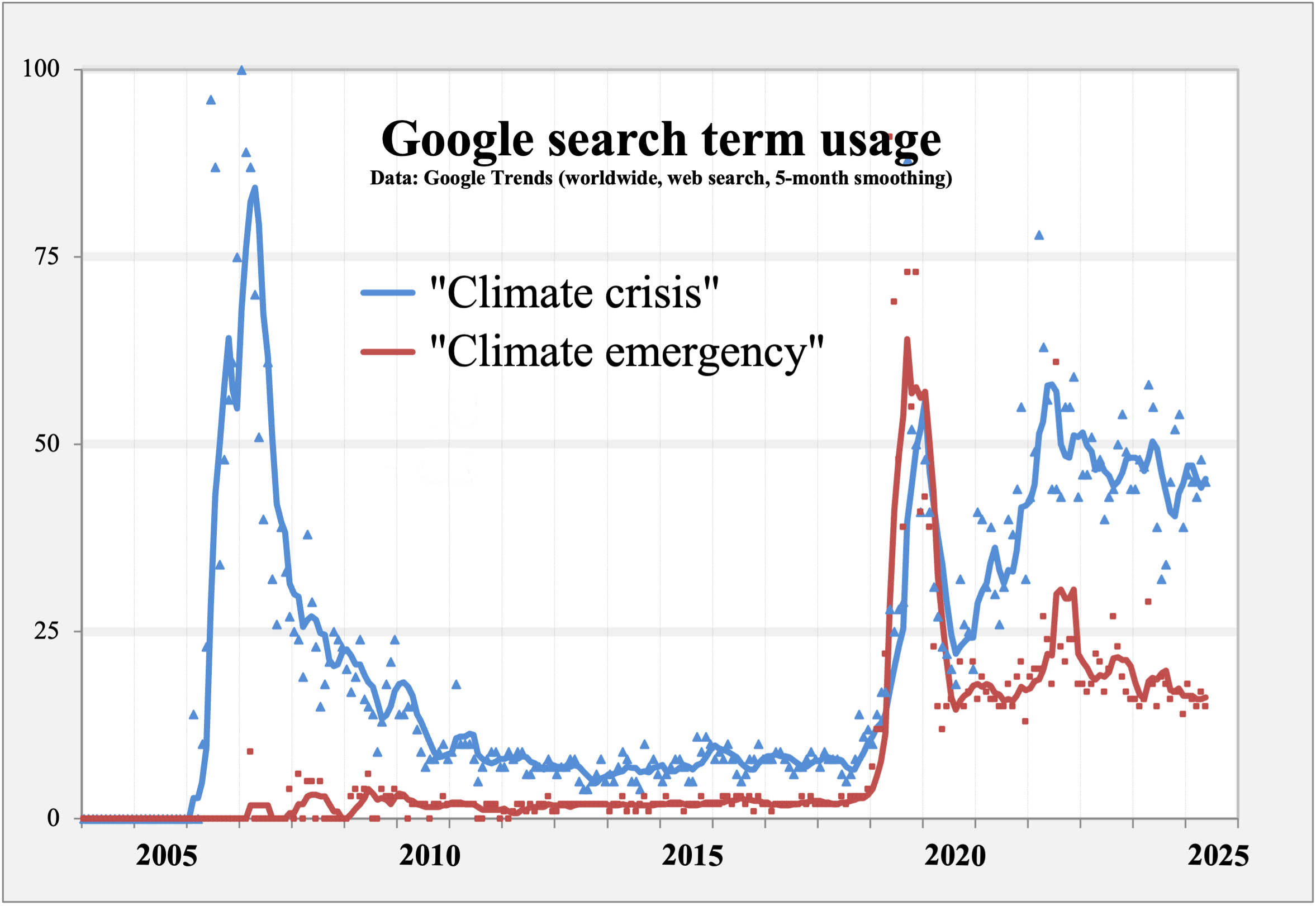
Google Trends data shows a growth in searches for the terms climate emergency (shown in red) and climate crisis (shown in blue).

Terms like "climate emergency" and climate crisis" have often been used by activists, and are increasingly found in academic papers.

A significant part of the research and public advocacy conversations about climate change have focused on the effectiveness of different terms used to describe "global warming". More recently, the focus has shifted to rhetoric describing all aspects and effects of climate change, including human-non-human relationships.

==== History of global warming ====
Before the 1980s, it was unclear whether the warming effect of increased greenhouse gases was stronger than the cooling effect of airborne particulates in air pollution. Scientists used the term inadvertent climate modification to refer to human impacts on the climate at this time. In the 1980s, the terms global warming and climate change became more common, often being used interchangeably. Scientifically, global warming refers only to increased global average surface temperature, while climate change describes both global warming and its effects on Earth's climate system, such as precipitation changes.

Climate change can also be used more broadly to include changes to the climate that have happened throughout Earth's history as result of natural processes. The term anthropogenic climate change is sometimes used to describe climate change resulting from human activities.

Global warming—used as early as 1975—became the more popular term after NASA climate scientist James Hansen used it in his 1988 testimony in the U.S. Senate. Since the 2000s, usage of climate change has increased. Various scientists, politicians and media may use the terms climate crisis or climate emergency to talk about climate change, and may use the term global heating instead of global warming.

==== Advocating change in the way non-humans are referred to ====
In her book Braiding Sweetgrass, author and botanist Robin Wall Kimmerer has suggested that the way in which animals and plants are referred to in language, specifically the English language, impact how they are perceived and therefore treated by persons who speak that language. Her ideas have gained attention and inspired other considerations of how language involving non-human species/groups affects views of and actions taken that involve them. The ways animals, plants, rivers, mountains, etc. are expressed in legislation can, in the view of University of Waterloo Professor, Jennifer Clary-Lemon, be damaging to perceptions as they seem to carry a persuasive tone, in favor of seeing these pieces of nature as less than; not recognizing their importance.

==== Analysis of current conversations on rhetorical changes in climate communication ====
There is not enough contribution to the field of climate change rhetoric to adequately implement rhetorical changes, despite the presumed effectiveness. Professor of Writing and Rhetoric, Eileen E. Schell of Syracuse University has described a lack of attention to conversations concerning changing rhetoric used to discuss climate change and other environmental problems. Experts believe research needs to be done in this area and then it could be applied to climate communication and could be effective in creating better messaging that spurs greater engagement and action.

=== Health ===
Climate change exacerbates a number of existing public health issues, such as mosquito-borne disease, and introduces new public health concerns related to changing climate, such as increase in health concerns after natural disasters or increases in heat illnesses. Thus the field of health communication has long acknowledged the importance of treating climate change as a public health issue, requiring broad population behavior changes that allow societal climate change adaptation. A December 2008 article in the American Journal of Preventive Medicine recommended using two broad sets of tools to effect this change: communication and social marketing. A 2018 study, found that even with moderates and conservatives who were skeptical of the importance of climate change, exposure to information about the health impacts of climate change creates greater concern about the issues. Climate change is also expected to impact mental health significantly. With the increase in emotional responses to climate change, there is a growing need for greater resilience and tolerance to emotional experiences. Research has indicated that these emotional experiences can be adaptive when they are supported and processed appropriately. This support requires the facilitation of emotional processing and reflective functioning. When this occurs, individuals increase in tolerance to emotion and resilience, and are then able to support others through crisis.

=== Importance of storytelling ===
Framing climate change information as a story has been shown to be an effective form of communication. In a 2019 study, climate change narratives structured as stories were better at inspiring pro-environmental behavior. The researchers propose that these climate stories spark action by allowing each experimental subject to process the information experientially, increasing their affective engagement and leading to emotional arousal. Stories with negative endings, for example, influenced cardiac activity, increasing inter-beat (RR) intervals. The story signalled the brain to be alert and take action against the threat of climate change.

A similar study has shown that sharing personal stories about experiences with climate change can convince climate change deniers. Hearing about how climate change has influenced someone's life elicits emotions like worry and compassion, which can shift beliefs about climate change.

=== Media coverage ===
In recent decades, newspaper coverage of climate change and global warming has generally increased, though with substantial variation along the way.

The effect of mass media and journalism on the public's attitudes towards climate change has been a significant part of communications studies. In particular, scholars have looked at how the media's tendency to cover climate change in different cultural contexts, with different audiences or political positions (for example Fox News's dismissive coverage of climate change news), and the tendency of newsrooms to cover climate change as an issue of uncertainty or debate, in order to give a sense of balance.

=== Popular culture ===
Further research has explored how popular media, like the film The Day After Tomorrow, popular documentary An Inconvenient Truth, and climate fiction change public perceptions of climate change. However, a 2025 study found that climate change is largely absent from popular culture. Only 12.8% of the most popular films released from 2013 to 2022 were found to include climate change in their story world, though the rate of inclusion increased substantially over time. When climate change was present, it was generally mentioned in just one scene, and its gravity and/or urgency was not emphasized.

== Effective climate communication ==
Effective climate communications require audience and contextual awareness. Different organizations have published guides and frameworks based on experience in climate communications. This section documents those various guidelines.

=== General guidance ===
A 2009 handbook developed by the Center for Research on Environmental Decisions at the Earth Institute at Columbia University describes eight main principles for communications based on the psychological research about Environmental decisions:

1. Know your audience
2. Get the Audience's Attention
3. Translate Scientific Data into Concrete Experiences
4. Beware the Overuse of Emotional Appeals
5. Address Scientific and Climate Uncertainties
6. Tap into Social Identities and Affiliates
7. Encourage Group Participation
8. Make Behavior Change Easier

A strategy playbook, developed based on lessons learned from the COVID pandemic communication, was released On Road Media in the UK in 2020. The framework is focused on developing positive messages that help people feel optimistic about learning more to address climate change. This framework included six recommendations:

1. Make it do-able and show change is possible
2. Focus on the big things and how we can change them
3. Normalize action and change, not inaction
4. Connect the planet's health with our own health
5. Emphasis our shared responsibility for future generations
6. Keep it down to earth

=== By experts ===
In 2018, the IPCC published a handbook of guidance for IPCC authors about effective climate communication. It is based on extensive social studies research exploring the impact of different tactics for climate communication. The guidelines focus on six main principles:

1. Be a confident communicator
2. Talk about the real world, not abstract ideas
3. Connect with what matters to your audience
4. Tell a human story
5. Lead with what you know
6. Use the most effective visual communication

=== Visuals ===
A 2018 study concluded that graphical illustrations such as charts and graphs more effectively overcome misperceptions than the same information presented in text. Separately, Climate Visuals a nonprofit, published in 2020 a set of guidelines based on evidence for climate communications. They recommend that visual communications include:

1. Show real people
2. Tell new stories
3. Show climate change causes at scale
4. Show emotionally powerful impacts
5. Understand your audience
6. Show local (serious) impacts
7. Be careful with protest imagery.

=== Applying findings from psychology ===
Psychologists have increasingly been assisting the worldwide community in facing the difficult challenge of organizing effective climate change mitigation efforts. Much work has been done on how to best communicate climate related information so that it has positive psychological impact, leading to people engaging in the problem, rather than evoking psychological defenses like denial, distance or a numbing sense of doom.

As well as advising on the method of communication, psychologists have investigated the difference it make when the right sort of person is doing the communication – for example, when addressing American conservatives, climate related messages have been shown to be received more positively if delivered by former military officers. Various people who are not primarily psychologists have also been advising on psychological matters related to climate change. For example, Christiana Figueres and Tom Rivett-Carnac, who led the efforts to organize the unprecedentedly successful 2015 Paris Agreement, have since campaigned to spread the view that a "stubborn optimism" mindset should ideally be part of an individual's psychological response to the climate change challenge.

A study from 2020 found that persuasive messaging that explains the mechanisms behind climate change, rather than the risks or consequences of climate change, was more effective in changing beliefs, especially among conservatives.

A 2023 synthesis in the Annual Review of Psychology found that climate change communication is more effective when it does the following simultaneously: (a) triggers biospheric values and environmental self-identity; (b) communicates social norms, including dynamic norms such that more people are behaving that way over time; and (c) is accompanied by system-level changes that lower the structural costs of behavior (e.g., enabling infrastructure, pricing, and defaults). Perceived distributive and procedural fairness, and trust in responsible actors, significantly predict the public acceptability of mitigation measures such as carbon pricing. Expected emotions, like the anticipated feelings of pride from low-carbon behaviors and guilt from high-carbon ones, also influence intentions and support for policies.

Noting multiple studies showing that people often prefer receiving numerical details over purely verbal communication, a study by science communicators Ellen Peters and David M. Markowitz reported that participants responded more favorably to messages with precise numeric information on climate change consequences, trusting the messages more, and thinking the message sender was more likely an expert. However, the researchers stated that people's math anxiety and level of mathematical ability suggested limiting the quantity of numerical information that should be presented. A 2025 study found that social psychological strategies were most effective at encouraging people to share climate change news and events, and that thinking about future outcomes were most effective for encouraging climate change action.

=== Sustainable development ===
The impacts of climate change are exacerbated in low- and middle income countries; higher levels of poverty, less access to technologies, and less education, means that this audience needs different information. The Paris Agreement and IPCC both acknowledge the importance of sustainable development in addressing these differences. In 2019 the nonprofit, Climate and Development Knowledge Network published a set of lessons learned and guidelines based on their experience communicating climate change in Latin America, Asia and Africa.

== Organizations ==
Research centers in climate communication include:

- Yale Program on Climate Change Communication
- Center for Climate Change Communication at George Mason University
- Climate Outreach (UK)
- Climate Commission (Australia)

Other bodies that research climate communication

- International Organizations
  - the Intergovernmental Panel on Climate Change (IPCC)
  - the UN Climate Change Secretariat

NGOs

- Climate and Development Knowledge Network
- Climate Council
- New Zero World
- Re.Climate (Canada)
- Parlons Climat (France)
- Act Climate Labs (USA)

== See also ==
- Climate crisis
- Climate emergency declaration

== Bibliography ==
- Carrington, Damian (17 May 2019). "Why the Guardian is changing the language it uses about the environment". The Guardian.
- Conway, Erik M. (5 December 2008). "What's in a Name? Global Warming vs. Climate Change". NASA. Archived from the original on 9 August 2010.
- IPCC (2014). "Annex II: Glossary" (PDF). IPCC AR5 SYR.
- Hodder, Patrick; Martin, Brian (2009). "Climate Crisis? The Politics of Emergency Framing". Economic and Political Weekly. 44 (36): 53–60. ISSN 0012-9976. JSTOR 25663518.
- Joo, Gea-Jae; Kim, Ji Yoon; Do, Yuno; Lineman, Maurice (2015). "Talking about Climate Change and Global Warming". PLOS ONE. 10 (9) e0138996. Bibcode:2015PLoSO..1038996L. doi:10.1371/journal.pone.0138996. ISSN 1932-6203. PMC 4587979. PMID 26418127.
- Rice, Doyle (21 November 2019). "'Climate emergency' is Oxford Dictionary's word of the year". USA TODAY.
- Rigby, Sara (3 February 2020). "Climate change: should we change the terminology?". BBC Science Focus Magazine.
- Shaftel, Holly (January 2016). "What's in a name? Weather, global warming and climate change". NASA Climate Change: Vital Signs of the Planet. Archived from the original on 28 September 2018.
- Weart, Spencer R. (February 2014a). "The Public and Climate Change: Suspicions of a Human-Caused Greenhouse (1956–1969)". The Discovery of Global Warming. American Institute of Physics. Archived from the original on 11 November 2016.
- Weart, Spencer R. (February 2014b). "The Public and Climate Change: The Summer of 1988". The Discovery of Global Warming. American Institute of Physics. Archived from the original on 11 November 2016.
- "What's the difference between global warming and climate change?". NOAA Climate.gov. 17 June 2015. Archived from the original on 7 November 2018.
- U.S. Senate, Committee on Energy and Natural Resources, 100th Cong. 1st sess. (23 June 1988). Greenhouse Effect and Global Climate Change: hearing before the Committee on Energy and Natural Resources, part 2. S. HRG.; 100-461.
