= Food safety-risk analysis =

A food safety-risk analysis is essential not only to produce or manufacture high quality goods and products to ensure safety and protect public health, but also to comply with international and national standards and market regulations. With risk analyses food safety systems can be strengthened and food-borne illnesses can be reduced. Food safety risk analyses focus on major safety concerns in manufacturing premises—not every safety issue requires a formal risk analysis. Sometimes, especially for complex or controversial analyses, regular staff is supported by independent consultants.

== Risk analysis ==
Risk analysis is defined for the purposes of the Codex Alimentarius Commission as "A process consisting of three components: risk management, risk assessment, and risk communication."

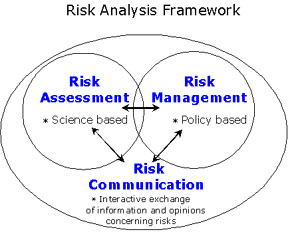
The diagram above illustrates the relationship between the three components of risk analysis.

=== Risk management ===
Risk management is defined for the purposes of the Codex Alimentarius Commission as "The process, distinct from risk assessment, of weighing policy alternatives, in consultation with all interested parties, considering risk assessment and other factors relevant for the health protection of consumers and for the promotion of fair trade practices, and, if needed, selecting appropriate prevention and control options."

=== Risk assessment ===
==== General characteristics ====
As defined by the Codex Alimentarius Commission and adopted by international food safety commissions, food safety risk assessment is "The scientific evaluation of known or potential adverse health effects resulting from human exposure to foodborne hazards." The most important aspect of risk assessment in relation to food safety is that it should be rooted in scientific data. Sources of data should be assembled in a systematic manner and should stem from valid scientific studies and communities across the world. A proper risk assessment can be described as being objective and unbiased, with absolute transparency. When at all possible, the assessment should remain independent of risk management as to preserve the integrity of the science and not have influence from regulatory policy and values. All assumptions made throughout the assessment should be well documented by the risk manager and should strive to be as objective, biologically realistic, and consistent as possible. As with any risk assessment performed, incomplete data or gaps in information create degrees of variability and uncertainty. In accounting for these factors, an extensive description of uncertainties in the risk estimate and their origins should be provided, as well as, descriptions of how assumptions being made can increase or decrease the uncertainty of results in the risk assessment. To increase the validity of a risk assessment, it is recommended that the assessment remain open for peer review and editing by food safety and science communities. A proper risk assessment is a constantly revolving process consisting of the following steps: (i) hazard identification, (ii) hazard characterization, (iii) exposure assessment, and (iv) risk characterization.

===== Hazard identification =====
"The identification of biological, chemical, and physical agents capable of causing adverse health effects and which may be present in a particular food or group of foods." This is often considered the most important step in a risk assessment as an unidentified hazard in the early stages of the production process can cause devastating effects in later stages.

- Potential biological hazards: bacteria, molds, yeasts, viruses, parasites, fish and shellfish as sources of toxic compounds, and pests (birds, insects, and rodents) as carriers of pathogens.
- Potential chemical hazards: toxic plant material, intentional/unintentional food additives, insecticides, pesticides, other agricultural chemicals, antibiotic or other drug residue, food allergens, food intolerances, excessive addition of nutrients, and anti-nutritional factors.
- Potential physical hazards: glass, wood, stones, metal, packaging materials, bones, and personal effects.

===== Hazard characterization =====
"The qualitative and/or quantitative evaluation of the nature of the adverse health effects associated with biological, chemical and physical agents which may be present in food. For chemical agents, a dose-response assessment should be performed. For biological or physical agents, a dose-response assessment should be performed if the data are obtainable." In this stage, risk assessors should describe the nature and extent of the adverse health effects known to be associated with the specific hazard. Using toxicity studies and epidemiological data, a dose-response relationship should be established between different levels of exposure to the hazard and the likelihood of different adverse health effects.

===== Exposure assessment =====
"The qualitative and/or quantitative evaluation of the likely intake of biological, chemical, and physical agents via food as well as exposures from other sources if relevant." This step characterizes the amount of hazard that is consumed by various members of the exposure populations. Taking into account the food consumption patterns of the target population and levels of hazard in all steps of the production process, an exposure assessment examines the exposure to the hazard over a particular period of time in foods that are actually consumed. The assessment should also account for varying levels of hazard throughout production to estimate the likely hazard level at point of consumption.

===== Risk characterization =====
"The qualitative and/or quantitative estimation, including attendant uncertainties, of the probability of occurrence and severity of known or potential adverse health effects in a given population based on hazard identification, hazard characterization and exposure assessment." During this stage, estimates of risk are generated from the outputs of hazard identification, hazard characterization, and exposure assessment. A proper risk characterization should take into account multiple degrees of uncertainty and variability.

=== Risk communication ===
Risk communication is defined for the purposes of the Codex Alimentarius Commission as "The interactive exchange of information and opinions throughout the risk analysis process concerning hazards and risks, risk-related factors and risk perceptions, among risk assessors, risk managers, consumers, industry, the academic community and other interested parties, including the explanation of risk assessment findings and the basis of risk management decisions."

Risk communication in food safety went through an evolutionary path and became highly specialised, developed to be a distinguishable and well-grounded area. Consumer science played a crucial role in the evolutionary procedure. Based on literature of the last 40 years, 5 + 1 stages in the evolution of food safety risk communication can be identified: Pre-risk communication era, Deficit model, Dialogue model, Partnership model, and Behavioural insight model. Expected future trends are summarised as a 6th stage, called Controlled risk environment model. The models are differentiated by level of consumer involvement and methodological approach. Despite the observed advancement between the stages, the application of each communication model might have justification under certain circumstances. In practice, the different stages have no clear boundaries, and the models can overlap. An organisation can even move on to the next phase by skipping a previous evolutionary step.

=== Codex Alimentarius Commission ===
The Codex Alimentarius Commission "...was created in 1963 by the Food Agriculture Organization (FAO) and the World Health Organization (WHO) to develop food standards, guidelines and related texts such as codes of practice under the Joint FAO/WHO Food Standards Programme. The main purposes of this Programme are protecting health of the consumers and ensuring fair trade practices in the food trade, and promoting coordination of all food standards work undertaken by international governmental and non-governmental organizations."
