= Climate Council =

Australian climate change organisation

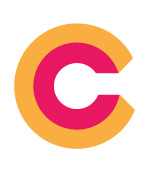
- Climate Council logo
- Predecessor: Climate Commission
- Formation: Australia, 2013
- Type: Nonprofit organization
- Purpose: Action and communications on climate change impacts and solutions
- Region served: Australia
- Official language: English
- Leader: Tim Flannery
- CEO: Amanda McKenzie
- Key people: Tim Flannery, Will Steffen, Gerry Hueston, Greg Mullins, Lesley Ann Hughes
- Website: Official website

The Climate Council is Australia's leading climate change communications non-profit organisation and was formed to provide independent, authoritative information on climate change and its solutions to the Australian public. It advocates reducing greenhouse gas emissions. It was created by former members of the Climate Commission after it was abolished by the Abbott government in 2013. It is funded by donations from the public.

== Background ==
The Australian Government, under the ruling Labor Party, formed the Climate Commission in February 2011 to act as an independent advisory group to report on the science of climate change. Following the Australian federal election in September 2013, the Labor Party lost power to the Liberal/National coalition, with Tony Abbott installed as Prime Minister. On 19 September 2013, Abbott instructed his ministers to disband the Climate Commission. Among the reasons given for closing the Commission were to "streamline government processes and avoid duplication of services", and to save the A$1.6 million per year spent in operating the Commission. Responsibility for advising the government on climate change was consolidated under the Bureau of Meteorology.

== Formation ==
Following the announcement that the Climate Commission was to be wound up, there was a public movement calling for its immediate reinstatement. Former chief commissioner of the Climate Commission, Tim Flannery, along with current CEO and co-founder, Amanda McKenzie, announced on 23 September 2013 that an independent non-profit organisation, the Climate Council, would be launched in its place. The founders of the Climate Council were all former commissioners of the disbanded Climate Commission, including Flannery, Veena Sahajwalla, Lesley Hughes, Will Steffen, and Gerry Hueston. Andrew Stock later joined as the sixth Climate Councillor.

The Climate Council now has 11 Councillors – experts in a range of fields including climate science, biology, health, bushfires, business, energy, public policy, and more. Additional Climate Councillors who joined the Council include Greg Mullins, Greg Bourne, Hilary Bambrick, Joëlle Gergis, Cheryl Durrant, and Kate Charlesworth.

== Funding and resources ==
The startup funding for the Council was raised through crowdfunding, with donations opening at midnight on 23 September 2013. By the end of Tuesday 24 September $218,000 had been given by 7,200 members of the public. Flannery told The Conversation on the Tuesday that the Council intended to raise $500,000 by the end of that first week. By Friday of the first week, in a stronger than expected response, over 20,000 people had donated amounts totalling close to $1 million.

The Climate Council continues to rely mostly on donors for funding (89%). The remainder of its funding comes from philanthropic sources. In 2022/23 the Climate Council declared an annual revenue of A$7.88 Million and 44.1 full time equivalent staff.

The 2018/19 financial year saw the Climate Council’s number of core members (weekly and monthly regular donors) grow to over 4,800 people with the average regular donation standing at $28.

== Independence ==
Tim Flannery is frequently cited as having stated that: "Our independence is central to our credibility, so if people do donate, don't try to influence what we do". Mark Wootton of the Climate Institute, speaking in support of the Climate Council, cited the need for an organisation to "hold account perhaps the government at times".

As an independent climate science research and communications organisation, the Climate Council is able to provide authoritative, expert advice to the Australian public on climate change and solutions based on the most up-to-date science available. This independence also means that the Climate Council is able to hold Australia's leaders and government to account in pursuing meaningful climate action. For example, during Black Summer, when Australia experience unprecedented bushfires, the Climate Council was a commentator in the media making sure that the connection between the bushfires and climate change were explicitly made. In March 2020, the Climate Council released ‘Summer of Crisis’, the first comprehensive overview of the summer’s devastating impacts. To date, the Climate Council has published over 100 research report.

== Projects ==
The Climate Council states its mission as "a courageous catalyst propelling Australia towards bold, effective action to tackle the climate crisis." The Climate Council has three goals: making sure climate change remains on the agenda, inspiring public engagement around the energy transition and enable people, businesses, local councils and communities to enact change.

In July 2020, the Climate Council released its Clean Jobs Plan jobs modelling with consulting firm AlphaBeta. It identified 12 policy options that could create 76,000 jobs around Australia. The modelling finds 15,000 jobs could be created in installing large-scale renewable energy, such as solar and wind farms. Some 12,000 jobs could be created in ecosystem restoration and another 12,000 jobs in public transport construction. The report was produced to highlight ways to shape Australia's post COVID-19 economic recovery while also addressing the climate crisis.

The Climate Council regularly publishes research reports on issues such as extreme weather, climate solutions, health, coal closure and international action. Its reports are used as a source of information for briefing politicians, providing updates to health and emergency services, teaching resources for schools and universities and as background research for the media. The Climate Council has also produced a range of communication guides to help other organisations, professionals and community leaders to communicate with the public about climate change and renewable energy solutions.

The Climate Council launched the Cities Power Partnership (CPP) in 2017 to provide councils and communities with the technical expertise and advice to transition to a clean, renewable energy future. The CPP is Australia’s largest local government climate network. Over 125 local governments - representing over 50% of Australians, have joined the Cities Power Partnership. Local councils who join the partnership make five action pledges in either renewable energy, efficiency, transport or working in partnership to tackle climate change. As of 2020, over 650 pledges have been made by local councils to take decisive climate and energy action.

Emergency Leaders for Climate Action (ELCA) is a project supported by the Climate Council, started in 2019. Led by Climate Councillor and former Commissioner of Fire & Rescue NSW, Greg Mullins, ELCA is a coalition of 33 former senior fire and emergency service leaders, representing every fire service in Australia and a number of SES and land management agencies. Their activities aim to protect Australian communities from increasingly frequent and damaging extreme weather events. In July 2020, ELCA released the Australian Bushfire and Climate Plan that provides recommendations about how to better protect Australia from the worsening impacts of climate change.

== See also ==
- Climate change in Australia
- Climate communication
