= Information deficit model =

Theory in science communication

In studies of science communication, the information deficit model, also known as the deficit model or science literacy/knowledge deficit model, theorizes that scientific literacy can be improved with increased public engagement by the scientific community. As a result, the public may then be able to make more decisions that are science-informed. The model implies that communication should focus on improving the transfer of information from experts to non-experts.

Currently, many studies challenge the information deficit model as it ignores the cognitive, social, and affective factors that influence one's formation of attitude and judgements toward science and technology.

== Deficit model of science communication ==
The original term 'deficit model' was believed to be coined in the 1930s, and sometimes attributed to the work of Jon D. Miller, though his widely cited work on scientific literacy does not employ the term. The deficit model sees the general population as the receiver of information and scientific knowledge. The information they receive, through whatever medium, has been prearranged according to what the distributors believe to be in the public's interest. Due to the recent growth of scientific research and subsequent discoveries, the deficit model suggests that this has led to a decrease in interest surrounding certain areas of science. This may be a result of the public feeling overwhelmed with information and disengaging, as it appears too much to take in.

There are two aspects to the deficit model. The first is the idea that public uncertainty and skepticism towards modern science, including environmental issues and technology, is caused primarily by a lack of sufficient knowledge about science and related subjects. The second aspect relates to the idea that by providing adequate information to overcome this lack of knowledge, also known as a 'knowledge deficit', the general public opinion will change based on the information being reliable and accurate.

Supporters of the deficit model in science communication argue that a better-informed public would increase their support for scientific exploration and technologies. In the deficit model, scientists assume that there is a knowledge deficit that can be 'fixed' by giving the public more information: scientists often assume that "given the facts (whatever they are), the public will happily support new technologies."

=== Controversy of the deficit model ===
The deficit model of scientific understanding perceives the public to be "blank slates" where their knowledge of scientific discourse and research is almost non-existent. The knowledge deficit is then informed by a reliable, knowledgeable, and hierarchical scientific community. But the increase in new information systems, such as the Internet and their ease of accessibility, has led to a greater cumulative knowledge of scientific research and the public's understanding.

However, critics state that the deficit model can also produce an unintended cumulative advantage system: growing inequality between and within the knowledge-attitude-practice (KAP) gap of individuals and groups due to a wide variety of possible moderators. Over time, these effects can exacerbate gaps between individuals' and groups' levels of KAP. With this in mind, this can also be a good thing in terms of the members of the public that can actively increase their own knowledge base, decrease the knowledge deficit and assess the truth and validity of what mass media outlets and governments are telling them. This should enhance and increase the relationship between the passive "blank slates" of the public, with the minority of the population who hold the 'knowledge surplus'.

The deficit model, however, has been discredited by a wealth of literature that shows that simply giving more information to people does not necessarily change their views. This is in part due to people wanting to feel that they have had their say (and have been heard) in any decision-making process and people making decisions based on a host of factors. These factors include ethical, political, and religious beliefs, in addition to culture, history, and personal experience.

Put another way, people's sense of risk extends beyond the purely scientific considerations of conventional risk analysis, and the deficit model marginalizes these 'externalities'. It is now widely accepted that the best alternative to deficit model thinking is to genuinely engage with the public and take these externalities into account.

=== Examples of externalities ===
Externalities can influence one's views and behaviors towards science and technology. For example, a survey of US public in 2004 found that religiosity correlates with support of nanotechnology. Additionally, in climate communication, even though today the majority of people worldwide believe climate change is a global emergency, climate action has been impeded by other factors, such as political opposition, corruption and oil company interest.

It has been also observed that sociodemographic factors such as education and age affect individuals' use of and access to communication channels; individuals' trust in and selection of health information from the program content and their changing health behaviors (as a result of the health information) are related to both their perception of the mass communication process and to sociodemographic factors but are more strongly related to the former.

With the challenges to the deficit model in science communication in health, caution is advised with the increasing role of technology and social media, and how these may affect the legitimacy of healthcare information flows away from the healthcare professional.

Furthermore, science communicators, particularly those seeking to address unsubstantiated beliefs, to look for alternative methods of persuasion. A 2019 study, for example, showed that exposure to the stories of an individual converted from opposing to supporting genetically modified organisms led to more positive attitudes toward GMOs.

=== Evidence for a deficit affecting opinion ===
A 2008 meta-analysis of 193 studies sought to interpret the link between science knowledge and attitude towards science. The studies included were taken using nonuniform methods across the world between 1989 and 2004 to provide a cross-cultural analysis. Broad and specific science knowledge and attitude categories were correlated. General science and general biology knowledge was gauged using questions similar to those by the National Science Foundation used to capture "civil scientific literacy". Data on general science and biology knowledge was then compared with attitudes towards general science, nuclear power, genetic medicine, genetically modified food, and environmental science. From the raw data, it was found that a small positive correlation exists between general science knowledge and attitude towards science, indicating that increased scientific knowledge is related to a favorable attitude towards a science topic and that this was not related to the socioeconomic or technological status of a country, but rather the number of individuals enrolled in tertiary education. However, some studies have found that high levels of science knowledge may indicate highly positive and highly negative attitudes towards specific topics such as agriculture biotechnology. Thus knowledge may be a predictor of the attitude strength and not necessarily if the attitude is positive or negative.

=== Evidence against the deficit model ===
While knowledge may influence attitude strengths, other studies have shown that merely increasing knowledge does not effectively augment public trust in science. In addition to scientific knowledge, the public uses other values (e.g. religion) to form heuristics and make decisions about scientific technology. These same values may cloud responses to questions probing the public's scientific understanding, an example being evolution. On the National Science Foundation Indicators, less than half (~45%) of Americans agreed that humans evolved from other species. This is much lower than reports from other countries and was interpreted as a deficit in scientific literacy. However, when a qualifier was added ("according to the theory of evolution..."), 72% of Americans correctly answered that humans evolved from other species. Therefore, knowledge alone does not explain public opinions with regard to science. Scientists must take other values and heuristics into account when communicating with the public in order to maintain trust and deference. In fact, some have called for more democratic accountability for bioethicists and scientists, meaning public values would feedback onto the progression/acceptance of scientific technology. Emerging evidence suggests that this public/science collaboration may even be rewarding for researchers: 82% of faculty surveyed in a 2019 study agreed that getting "food for thought" from their public audiences was a positive outcome from public engagement activities. As attention among the academics starts shifting back towards an emphasis on public engagement, organizations like the American Association for the Advancement of Science (AAAS) have therefore called for "intentional, meaningful interactions that provide opportunities for mutual learning between scientists and members of the public".

== The role of the media ==
Mass media representations, ranging from news to entertainment, are critical links between the everyday realities of how people experience certain issues and the ways in which these are discussed at a distance between science, policy, and public actors. Numerous studies show that the public frequently learns about science and more specifically issues such as climate change from the mass media. Heuristics (see low-information rationality and cognitive miser) also play a role in decision-making where the way.

The actual processes behind the communication and dissemination of information from experts to the public may be far more complex and deep-running than the deficit model suggests. In mass communication, the communicator (source) is always a part of an organized group and is most often a member of an institution that has functions other than communication. A receiver is always an individual; however, receivers are often seen by communicator organizations as members of a group that share some general characteristics. The channel includes large-scale technologically based distribution devices and systems.

=== 'Spinning', Heuristics, and Framing ===
There is perceived to be a trend within the world's media to commit to report the full facts, Factual reporting has given way to a more obvious, less reliable method to concentrate coverage on interpretations of the facts. This so-called 'spin' (see Frank Luntz) is reported by the world's press under a combination of commercial and political pressure. In other words, the media provides the public with cognitive shortcuts or heuristics to quickly digest new information. The way message is framed may influence one's attitudes. The subjects of anthropogenic global warming and climate change is repeatedly exemplified. However, in all cases it is becoming increasingly difficult to separate out the factual basis of what is being reported from the 'spin' that is exerted on the way a story is reported and presented.

Framing can be used to reduce the complexity of an issue, or to persuade audiences, and can play into the underlying religious beliefs, moral values, prior knowledge, and even trust in scientists or political individuals. Further, the transmission of scientific ideas and technological adoption may be strongly linked to the passage of information between easily influenced individuals, versus the widely accepted "two-step flow" theory where a few opinion leaders acted as intermediaries between mass media and the general public. Decreasing the knowledge deficit is a complicated task, but if we know how the general public thinks, or how they go about learning and interpreting new information, we can better communicate our message to them in the most unbiased, objective way possible.

== Alternative models ==
A supported alternative to the knowledge deficit model, the low-information rationality model states humans minimize costs associated with making decisions and forming attitudes, thereby avoiding developing in-depth understandings.

In food safety risk communication, the deficit model was widely followed by food safety authorities in the last decades, even after more developed risk communication models, such as the dialogue model and the partnership model appeared.

== See also ==
- Cultural cognition
- Low-information rationality
- Thinking, Fast and Slow
- Heuristics
