= Risk communication =

Academic sub-field of risk management

Risk communication is a complex cross-disciplinary academic field that is part of risk management and related to fields like crisis communication. The goal is to make sure that targeted audiences understand how risks affect them or their communities by appealing to their values.

Risk communication is particularly important in disaster preparedness, public health, and preparation for major global catastrophic risk. For example, the impacts of climate change and climate risk effect every part of society, so communicating that risk is an important climate communication practice, in order for societies to plan for climate adaptation. Similarly, in pandemic prevention, understanding of risk helps communities stop the spread of disease and improve responses.

Risk communication deals with possible risks and aims to raise awareness of those risks to encourage or persuade changes in behavior to relieve threats in the long term. On the other hand, crisis communication is aimed at raising awareness of a specific type of threat, the magnitude, outcomes, and specific behaviors to adopt to reduce the threat.

Risk communication in food safety is part of the risk analysis framework. Together with risk assessment and risk management, risk communication aims to reduce foodborne illnesses. Food safety risk communication is an obligatory activity for food safety authorities in countries, which adopted the Agreement on the Application of Sanitary and Phytosanitary Measures.

Risk communication also exists on a smaller scale. For instance, the risks associated with personal medical decisions have to be communicated to that individual along with their family.

== Types ==
Risk communication takes place on different scales, of which have different features and methods.

=== Community risk communication ===
Risk communication was used to inform the public of the dangers of the Coronavirus pandemic, including many suggested measures.

Risk communication on a community-wide scale mainly falls into specific categories. Some of the most well-studied areas of risk communication are climate change, nutrition, and natural disasters like floods.

With the rise of COVID-19 in 2019, risk communication strategies utilized by governments to their communities were heavily critiqued. In the modern day, most people in groups get their information from the internet before anything else, so the sending of risk communication messages has methodologically changed.

=== Individual risk communication ===
One of the most common causes for the enactment of risk communication is medical-based personal issues. In a 2015 study, risk communication to people who had family members with dementia took place, and a model was developed that heavily features shared decision-making processes. In these cases where families of patients are involved, there is no general message that is sent out to the public. Instead, what often happens is that an intervention takes place between the medical experts and the family.

== Theories ==
One major area of theorization in academic risk communication research explores how the attitudes and predispositions of individuals can influence their engagement with information and messaging related to risks. This research direction typically adapts theories from social psychology to risk-specific communication contexts, such as the Theory of Planned Behavior or the Heuristic-Systematic Model. Research in this area tends to span a wide variety of risk or hazard contexts, including environmental health risks, environmental hazards, climate change-related risks, cancer risks, and infectious disease risks.

=== Risk Information Seeking & Processing Model ===
Within risk communication research, the risk information seeking & processing (RISP) model hypothesizes that seven factors affect how individuals will seek and process information about risks. Per Griffin et al. (1999), those seven factors are:

1. Individual characteristics
The demographic, social, and cultural background of individuals. This includes characteristics like gender, ethnicity, age, and socioeconomic status. Another relevant dimension includes personal political ideology, such as a person's extent of identification with liberalism or conservatism. An individual's past experience with a particular risk or hazard is also a relevant characteristic.
2. Informational subjective norms
Individuals can perceive different levels of social normative influence around having sufficient information about a particular risk. Put another way, people might feel peer pressure to be informed about a relevant risk or hazard. This hypothesis is largely guided by the Theory of Planned Behavior, which holds that people may be motivated to do certain actions (such as seek information about a risk) based on the expectation that it is a socially desirable behavior.
3. Hazard characteristics
Certain features of a particular risk or hazard can influence how people seek and process information about it. For example, risks that are considered likely to occur may prompt an individual to have an urgent need for information about that risk. Other characteristics of risks that may influence individual's subsequent risk-related information seeking and processing efforts include: personal susceptibility to the risk; expected severity of the risk; personal level of control over the risk; and the perceived ability of risk management organizations to handle the specific risk.
4. Affective response to risk
The emotional reaction to a risk can influence how people respond to it. Common negative emotional responses to risk information, such as fear, dread, anxiety, and outrage are theorized to influence how risk-relevant information is sought and understood. Drawing from the Heuristic-Systematic Model of Information Processing, this dimension posits that negative emotions and moods will lead to systematic processing of risk information, which is theorized to involve more in-depth thought about information and a higher likelihood to internalize it. Conversely, this line of thinking expects positive emotions and moods, such as happiness, will lead to heuristic information processing, which is associated with lower cognitive effort devoted to considering information.
5. Information sufficiency
Also drawing from the Heuristic-Systematic Model, this factor is related to the idea that individuals hold a mental threshold for determining when the amount of information they have on a particular topic is sufficient. The Heuristic-Systematic model assumes that individuals will always strive to ensure that their current knowledge of a subject is meets their sufficiency threshold, and will take action based on this perception. A higher threshold for information sufficiency about a risk will mean that individuals feel a desire to learn more about the topic, which would motivate them to seek out more information and process that information with higher effort. In contrast, a lower information sufficiency threshold for a risk or hazard would mean that an individual is content with less information, and will be less motivated in their information seeking and processing efforts related to that risk, or perhaps not make any effort to search for information if they feel that they already know enough. Griffin et al. (1999) theorize that individuals develop information sufficiency thresholds for risk information based on a variety of individual characteristics, perceptions about a risk or hazard's characteristics, and informational subjective norms.
6. Perceived Information Gathering Capacity
This factor is concerned with the idea that people have perceptions about their ability to gather information on a topic. Information gathering ability has several relevant considerations, including a person's self-perception of their skills in searching and finding relevant information, their perception of the physical barriers to searching for information (such as a drive to the closest library), or their perception of their cognitive ability to subsequently understand found information if it proves to be technical or difficult.
7. Relevant channel beliefs
Channel beliefs are preconceptions about the usefulness or relevance of different information channels one might use to find information about risks or hazards. For example, preconceived biases against certain news platforms may influence whether people trust the information found there. Following information processing research, Griffin et al. (1999) expect that media perceived to be lower quality requires more active processing as a means of self-defense from manipulation. With these considerations in mind, it is assumed that beliefs about a particular source of information will influence the way risk information from it is processed.

The RISP model and its factors have been tested across a variety of risk contexts. A meta-analysis from Yang et al. (2014) generally supported the model's expectations, although they found that a reduced model with only two variables - composed of individual's existing knowledge on the risk and their subjective normative expectations around seeking information about it - explained a fairly substantial level of variance. Variations of the original RISP model have been tested empirically in risk communication research, such as the Planned Risk Information Seeking Model (PRISM), the Framework of Risk Information Seeking (FRIS), the Reduced Risk Information Seeking Model (RISK), and the Augmented Risk Information Seeking Model (A-RISP). These variations generally follow the underpinning theoretical guidance of the original RISP model, such as the Theory of Planned Behavior and the Heuristic-Systematic Model of Information Processing, but make various variable-related changes when testing the model empirically.

=== Social Amplification of Risk Framework ===
The social amplification of risk framework (SARF) is another theory in risk communication. The SARF was developed to link the technical assessment of risk (such as forecasts and likelihoods) with psychological, sociological, and cultural perspectives of risk perceptions and risk-related behavior. The primary position of the SARF is that risks or hazards interact with a variety of social, psychological, and institutional processes in a manner that will either amplify or attenuate public response to those risks or hazards. The framework theorizes a two-stage process where 1) risk information is transmitted in some manner through some channel to public audiences, then 2) society responds to that risk information.

== Methods ==
=== Risk communication and community engagement ===
Risk communication and community engagement (RCCE) is a method that draws heavily on volunteers, frontline personnel and on people without prior training in this area. The World Health Organization advocated for this approach during the early recommendations for public health mitigation of the COVID-19 pandemic.

=== Substantive harm analysis ===
Another way to do risk communication analysis is to test the risks. Specifically, testing on the four main types of harm outlined by Löfstedt. These four types of harm, in relation to risk communication, are death, illness or injury, lack of resources, and injury to social status. The next step is then to test those risks of harm in three different fields to get a sense of the overall scope of the possible harm.

== Challenges ==
Problems for risk communicators involve how to reach the intended audience, how to make the risk comprehensible and relatable to other risks, how to pay appropriate respect to the audience's values related to the risk, how to predict the audience's response to the communication, etc. A main goal of risk communication is to improve collective and individual decision making.

Some experts coincide that risk is not only enrooted in the communication process but also it cannot be dissociated from the use of language. Though each culture develops its own fears and risks, these construes apply only by the hosting culture. These differences stem from epistemological barriers, as well as social construction ones. When there are varying community-based beliefs in a situation, the importance of the risk at hand is also varied, as different communities have different perceptions of how impactful a result might be.

=== Nutrition risk communication ===
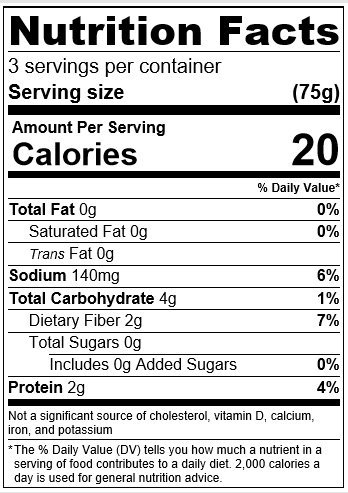
Calls for more clear and comprehensive communication of nutritional facts and risk led to the creation of the standard nutrition label.

Unlike other risk communication areas, there is not a definite unambiguous relationship between the intake of food and the effect on the human body. This has led to conflicts between suppliers and consumers when a controversy comes to light. Among professional nutritionists, there is debate on whether certain diets or foods are in fact good or bad for humans, as everyone's body can react differently to food intake. Studies have retained that nutrition risk communication has been poor over time, as the strategies employed may be too similar to those employed in nuclear disaster situations. When this strategy is employed, those who receive the risk communication messages can become irritated, as they feel the actual scope of the danger does not match the message.

=== Government risk communication ===
Some challenges with risk communication by governments stems from whether or not the communities being communicated to even want to know about the risks they are facing. In a 2013 study, Canadian citizens reacted positively when their government communicated risks they had individual control over, but found communicating minute risks that had no individual control over irrelevant and unnecessary. When someone is irritated by a risk communication message, it is likely that their "gut feeling" is impacted, leading to a possible misunderstanding of the situation.
