= Cities Power Partnership =

Australian nonprofit organization

- Formation: 2017; 8 years ago Australia
- Type: Nonprofit organization
- Purpose: To provide councils and communities with the technical expertise and advice to transition to a clean, renewable energy future.
- Region served: Australia
- Affiliations: Climate Council
- Website: citiespowerpartnership.org.au

The Cities Power Partnership (CPP) is a network of local councils in Australia established by the Climate Council in mid 2017 to co-ordinate reducing emissions and to provide councils and communities with the technical expertise and advice to transition to a clean, renewable energy future.

The CPP is Australia's largest local government climate network, now comprising 165 organisational members as of November 2021.

== Background ==
Initially the Partnership had 35 Councils participating at its launch at the Mt Majura Solar Farm in the ACT.

Climate Councillor Dr Tim Flannery highlighted that NSW South Coast Councils, including Bega Council, were the first to sign up. "Bega was one of the very first councils to sign up. We put a bit of a call out to Australia, and you guys were really in there."

The City of Newcastle was also a founding member of the CPP, and in April 2020 Deputy Mayor Cr Declan Clausen highlighted in a CPP video the transition of the industrial steel and coal based city being the first Council in NSW to source 100% of its energy needs from renewable energy. "The city of Newcastle is really proud to be the first council in NSW to have 100 per cent of its energy needs delivered by renewable energy. Newcastle has always been an industrial town. First it was coal, then it was steel and now, it's renewables."

The Partnership has since grown to encompass 165 municipal and shire councils around Australia at the end of 2021.

== Council Pledges ==
Participating local councils pledge five actions to tackle climate change when they join in either renewable energy, efficiency, transport or working in partnership to tackle climate change. As of 2020, over 650 pledges have been made by local councils to take decisive climate and energy action.

== Annual Climate Awards ==
The Cities Power Partnership runs yearly climate awards now in 10 categories which member councils participate in.

Awards are for Renewable Energy, Energy Efficiency, Sustainable Transport, Community Engagement, Innovation, Ambition, Collaboration, Climate Ambassador, Climate Champion, Community Choice.
