= Emergency Leaders for Climate Action =

Climate change ex-fire chiefs in Australia

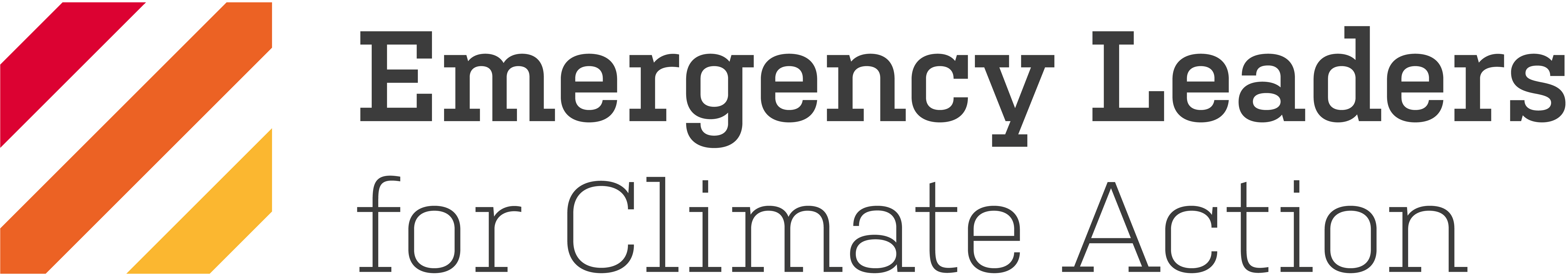
- Formation: Australia, 2019
- Type: Nonprofit organization
- Purpose: To better prepare Australia against extreme weather events by addressing the underlying cause: climate chamge.
- Region served: Australia
- Key people: Greg Mullins, Peter Dunn, Lee Johnson, David Templeman, Phil Koperberg
- Affiliations: Climate Council
- Website: emergencyleadersforclimateaction.org.au

Emergency Leaders for Climate Action (ELCA) is an organization of ex-fire and emergency chiefs in Australia. They have a particular interest in addressing the underlying causes of extreme weather events, focusing especially on climate change.

== Background ==
Emergency Leaders for Climate Action was launched on 10 April 2019. ELCA was created by a group of senior leaders who previously directed fire and emergency services in every state and territory in Australia. The 23 founders created ELCA to address climate change, which they understand to be the underlying cause of increasing extreme weather events, though they felt constrained from discussing it while working in the public service.

During the launch, former National Parks and Wildlife Service (New South Wales) fire manager, Bob Conroy, announced that, "Climate change is upon us, it's perilous and we need to do more about it." They also issued a joint letter to Prime Minister Scott Morrison. The 23 signatories of the letter called for a meeting with the Prime Minister to discuss "unconstrained by their former employers, how climate change risks are rapidly escalating."

Former NSW Fire and Rescue commissioner, Climate Council Councillor, and founder of Emergency Leaders for Climate Action, Greg Mullins stated, "We are deeply concerned about the lack of climate action at a national level and felt obligated to speak out," and that we have a "duty to tell people how climate change is super-charging our natural disaster risks."

Mullins also stated that the summer of 2019–20 was going to be "the worst I have ever seen" and encouraged the Federal Government to urgently introduce measures to address climate change such as limiting the burning of fossil fuels such as coal, oil and gas.

Emergency Leaders for Climate Action is a project supported by the Climate Council.

== Black Summer ==
During the summer 2019–20 bushfire season, Australia experienced months of devastating bushfires across the nation, unprecedented in their scale, duration, and intensity, prompting it to be called the "summer from hell". Many records were broken over the summer. Overall, 26 people lost their lives, almost 2,500 homes were lost, and more than 5.5 million hectares were burnt. Almost 80% of Australians were impacted - directly or indirectly - by the bushfires, and the Gospers Mountain fire, "the Monster", was Australia's largest forest fire ever recorded, burning more than 500,000 hectares.

Throughout the duration of the bushfires, members of ELCA regularly appeared in the media to provide commentary on the conditions and consistently linked the cause of the unprecedented bushfires to climate change.

Greg Mullins penned an op-ed during the worst of the fires that stated, "In the past I have heard some federal politicians dodge the question of the influence of climate change on extreme weather and fires by saying, 'It's terrible that this matter is being raised while the fires are still burning.' But if not now, then when?" In another op-ed he stated that, "The Federal Government’s failure to address climate change will increasingly place Australian lives and property in danger."

Former ACT Emergency Services Authority commissioner Peter Dunn said that, "What I'm seeing is an absolute crisis in the leadership that we do not have right now in this country. Our leadership is asleep at the wheel. In fact, in some areas, I think it's on life support."

During the summer of 2019–20, ELCA was mentioned over 78,000 times in the media reaching over 100 million people. This included 14,000 times in traditional media and 64,000 times on social media.

== National Bushfire and Climate Summit ==
Prompted by their "huge disappointment in the lack of national leadership during a bushfire crisis", ELCA members announced in December 2019 that they would convene their own summit, once the bushfire season was over, to discuss how Australia should better prepare for and resource bushfire emergencies.

In relation to the announcement, Mullins announced, "What we feel is that there’s just still this denial of [climate change] and where we have denial of the problem, there’s not going to be any action. So we’ll go it alone. We’ll arrange a national summit that will look at building standards, fuel management practices, response capability and national coordination arrangements."

The National Bushfire and Climate Summit was convened during June and July 2020. It consisted of four roundtable discussions with experts including climate scientists, former and current emergency leaders, Indigenous fire practitioners, doctors, veterinarians, farmers, community leaders, social service providers, economists, mayors, bushfire survivors, and more. This was in addition to two public panels hosted by Greg Mullins and Kerry O'Brien.

The Summit culminated in the release of The Australian Bushfire and Climate Plan. The document consists of 165 recommendations to better protect Australians from bushfires. The first recommendation states that "The Federal Government must address the root cause of the climate crisis and worsening bushfires through a national commitment to net zero emissions, strengthening of Australia’s 2030 emissions reduction targets, and the managed phase-out of all fossil fuels." Other key recommendations from the plan include: more large aerial firefighting capability, better fuel management, an Indigenous-led National Cultural Fire Strategy, better coordinating wildlife recovery and better utilisation of the Australian Defence Force. The report also called on the Federal Government to set up a national climate disaster fund, paid for by creating a levy for the fossil fuel industry, to pay for the impact of natural disasters.
