= Greg Mullins (firefighter) =

Australian firefighter

Greg Mullins AO AFSM is an Australian firefighter. He is a former Commissioner of Fire and Rescue New South Wales, a Climate Councillor with the Climate Council and a founding member of Emergency Leaders for Climate Action.

== Early life ==
Firefighting is a family profession. Greg Mullins' father, Jack, was also a firefighter who served with Terrey Hills RFS for 61 years. This meant Mullins started fighting fires from a young age. He describes, "I fought my first large fire on 1 October 1971 with Dad – a huge fire was scorching its way from Bobbin Head through to Duffys Forest – and joined the local bushfire brigade the year after." From that moment onwards he said, "I was hooked."

== Fire and Rescue New South Wales ==
Aged 13, Mullins joined the Terrey Hills bushfire brigade as a volunteer. He served there for six years before joining NSWFB full-time in 1978 where he was first stationed in Manly. Mullins came to serve as Station Officer in 1990, District Officer (Inspector) in 1992, and a Superintendent in 1995. He was then appointed as Assistant Commissioner in 1996, becoming the youngest person ever to hold this position. In 2000, he became the Director of State Operations. He regularly represented Australia emergency services internationally, covering issues such as terrorist attacks, urban search and rescue, and climate change.

Mullins was appointed as Commissioner in July 2003, a position he held until retiring in January 2017. He retired as the second longest serving Fire Chief in New South Wales since the organisation began in 1884. He was also the first person to fill both roles of Chief Fire Officer and Chief Executive Officer. During this time, he was responsible for more than 6,800 firefighters based at 337 fire stations, 400 support staff, and 6,000 volunteers.

One of Mullins' main goals as Commissioner was to increase how many women were in the brigade. When he first joined "only men could fight fires". In 1985, women were then "allowed" to join. However, there was for a long time a low uptake of female firefighters. Mullins' parents had demonstrated for equal rights for women in the 1960s and 70s, and Mullins introduced equal male female recruitment. The class of 2016 reached this goal with equal numbers of men and women.

Since retirement, Mullins has rejoined the Volunteer Rural Fire Brigade of Terrey Hills where he started in 1972.

Reflecting on his time during office, Mullins believes that current serving fire chiefs are gagged from speaking out in different ways. He stated that when he was in the role, "some things were out of bounds and often climate change was one of those issues, even to the point of having to work around it when preparing documents, and I think that is a tragedy." He has also stated, "when I was commissioner I was constrained in talking about climate change because it was very inconvenient to some politicians...I was spoken to by my minister at the time and senior officials saying not to buy into that, just don't, it's not your job, just fight the fires."

== Awards ==
Mullins has received the following awards:

- 2018: Officer of the Order of Australia (AO)
- 2016: Police Commissioner’s Commendation for Service
- 2001: Australian Fire Service Medal (AFSM)
- 2001: National Medal – 1st Clasp
- 1993: National Medal
- 1991: St Johns Ambulance Emergency Services Award

== Emergency Leaders for Climate Action ==
Mullins is a founding member of Emergency Leaders for Climate Action (ELCA) which was launched on 10 April 2019. ELCA is a group of experienced ex-fire and emergency chiefs in Australia. They have a particular interest in addressing the underlying causes of allegedly extreme weather events, focusing especially on "climate change".

As Mullins explained, "Across our careers, we have observed the climate changing for the worse, and natural disaster risks escalating in tandem with increased frequency and intensity of extreme weather events. The science is clear, simple, and cannot be disputed – intensifying extreme weather is being driven by the warming atmosphere and oceans, and since the year 2000 there has been a significant increase in the frequency and number of serious weather events. Our group, which launched with 23 members last year and now counts 33 former fire chiefs among our ranks, has made repeated, and detailed recommendations to the Federal government on how to better prepare Australia for worsening bushfire danger." Mullins also stated, "We are deeply concerned about the lack of climate action at a national level and felt obligated to speak out."

During the bushfires that raged during Black Summer, Mullins, along with other members of ELCA, frequently appeared in the media.

Mullins and other members of ELCA tried to meet with Australian Prime Minister, Scott Morrison, for multiple months in the lead up to summer to “warn the prime minister about what veteran firefighters, climate scientists and meteorologists all identified as a looming bushfire disaster.” He has also stated that they "knew that a bushfire crisis was coming".

Throughout summer, Mullins consistently linked the cause of the bushfires to climate change. He has stated, "We have to talk about climate change because our bushfire season in Australia has changed forever". He called for the urgent need to phase out fossil fuels as the driver behind climate change and the bushfires, "if we are to have any hope of coping with the increasing bushfire threat, we must deal with the underlying driver – by phasing out fossil fuels, banning new coal, oil, and gas projects, and reaching net zero emissions as fast as possible."

Mullins has also pushed back on what he perceived to be a lack of leadership from the Federal Government and a reluctance to speak about climate change. He stated, "This government fundamentally doesn't like talking about climate change. We would like the doors to be open to the current chiefs, and allow them to utter the words 'climate change'. They are not allowed to at the moment."

In response to the fires, Mullins chaired The National Bushfire and Climate Summit, hosted by ELCA, in June and July 2020 to discuss how to protect Australia from escalating fire danger. The Summit culminated in the release of The Australian Bushfire and Climate Plan. This provided 165 practical recommendations about how to combat bushfires in Australia and improve Australia’s effective bushfire readiness, response, and recovery. Mullins stated, "Australia's strategy has to go beyond the fire prevention and fighting process itself". Instead he argues, "the Federal Government must tackle the root cause of climate change by urgently phasing out fossil fuels to reach net zero emissions."

Mullins has also been a Climate Councillor with the Climate Council since 2018.
