= Amanda McKenzie =

Australian climate change advocate

- Education: Monash University; University of Melbourne
- Known for: Climate change advocacy
- Scientific career
- Workplaces: Climate Council
- Thesis: Designing an Australian emissions trading scheme that is compatible with the global carbon market

Amanda McKenzie is a public commentator on the climate crisis in Australia. She is the CEO and co-founder of the Climate Council, Australia's leading climate science communications organisation. Previously, McKenzie co-founded the Australian Youth Climate Coalition, and was its National Director for four years. She has also served on Renewable Energy Expert Panels for the Queensland and Northern Territory governments. McKenzie was the founding Chair of the Centre for Australian Progress, and is a former Board Director at Plan International Australia and the Whitlam Institute. She has won numerous awards, including being recognised as one of Westpac's 100 Women of Influence, and a finalist in Telstra Young Business Woman of the Year Awards.

== Early life and career ==
McKenzie was raised in the suburbs of Melbourne. She earned an arts degree at Melbourne University, followed by a law degree (honours) at Monash University. She initially planned to be a human rights lawyer, until she learned about climate change, which she says she realised was going to be ‘a human catastrophe as much as an environmental catastrophe'.

In 2006 McKenzie founded the Australian Youth Climate Coalition, which became "one of Australia's largest climate change advocacy groups, with more than 100,000 members". She is on the board of the Centre for Australian Progress and on the board of Plan International Australia.

In 2011 McKenzie joined the Climate Commission in the position of senior communications advisor. The Abbott Government dismantled the Climate Commission in 2013, and then McKenzie co-ordinated and led the largest crowd-funding campaign in Australia at the time. Upon hearing the news that the Climate Commission would be disbanded, she said to Tim Flannery, "How about if we made this a public institution and get it funded by the general public as a not-for-profit?" Tim just rubbed his hands together and said, "That's a really great idea." This led to $1 million of funding being received in the first few days, $1.3 million in funding within 10 days from a pool of 16,000 people was received. This funding then allowed the commission to re-launch as the Climate Council, a not for profit organisation.

== Climate change and renewables advocacy ==
McKenzie is CEO of the Climate Council, an independent Australian climate change communications organisation, made up of some of the country's leading climate scientists, health, renewable energy and policy experts.

Under McKenzie's leadership, the Climate Council has played a significant role in reshaping the public conversation on climate change in Australia, moving public debate to a discussion of solutions, like renewable energy; shifting the public understanding of extreme weather and climate change with public polling showing that increasingly the public link the two; and elevating renewable energy to a top tier political issue.

McKenzie is passionate about gaining meaningful action on climate change and isn't afraid to call out our leaders when they are not doing enough to protect Australians from the dangerous impacts of climate change and embrace the clean technologies we have on hand. In 2019 she stated that Morrison's claim that "Australia was doing enough on climate change was colossal bulls**t."

She also reported in 2019 that Australian's would be shocked at the cover ups by the Federal Government. The Climate Council report "Climate Cuts, Cover Ups and Censorship" provided evidence that the federal government of Australia had reduced climate change funding, 'rejected advice from climate bodies' as well as 'weakened capabilities by cutting jobs at CSIRO'. "I think most Australians would be outraged if they knew the full story," McKenzie said.

"The Coalition Government has slashed climate science funding, censored important information and repeatedly made false claims."

== Media ==
McKenzie is a frequent media commentator on climate and energy topics. McKenzie has spoken in the media on topics such as the Climate Council's Clean Job Plan, linking the Black Summer bushfires and climate change, and energy debates in Australia. For example, SBS covered the Climate Council's report in the weeks before the 2019 federal election.

"Heatwaves have become hotter and last longer, while droughts, intense rainfall and bushfire conditions have become more severe," McKenzie said. "As Australians experience escalating consequences into the future, they are likely to view this period of missed opportunities and failed leadership with deep dismay."

She has also written on the period when the federal government releases their carbon emissions figures, during Christmas when the public is distracted, and how Australia's carbon emissions have risen over the years 2014–2019. Her work on climate change and renewable energy, has been described by the Huffington Post, the ABC, and other media In 2019 she was a speaker for the Smart Energy and Climate Emergency webinar.

== Awards and recognition ==
- 2020 — Invited Keynote Celebrating Women in Conservation Breakfast.
- 2017 — Invited Keynote MLC woman of influence.
- 2014 — Australian Financial Review (AFR) woman of influence.
- 2011 — TEDx Melbourne speaker.
- 2010 — Monash University Distinguished Alumni.
- 2010 — Attended the Multi-Party Climate Change Committee Round Table. Led the Australian youth delegations to the United Nations Climate Change Conferences in Bali, Poznan and Copenhagen.
- 2009 — Young Environmentalist of the Year.
- 2009 — Rotary Young Achiever of the Year.
