= Climate Commission =

Australian climate change organisation

The Climate Commission was an independent body established in 2011 by the Government of Australia to communicate "reliable and authoritative information" about climate change in Australia. Abolished by the newly elected LNP government led by Prime Minister Tony Abbott in September 2013, it was relaunched as an independent non-profit organisation called the Climate Council.

== Formation ==
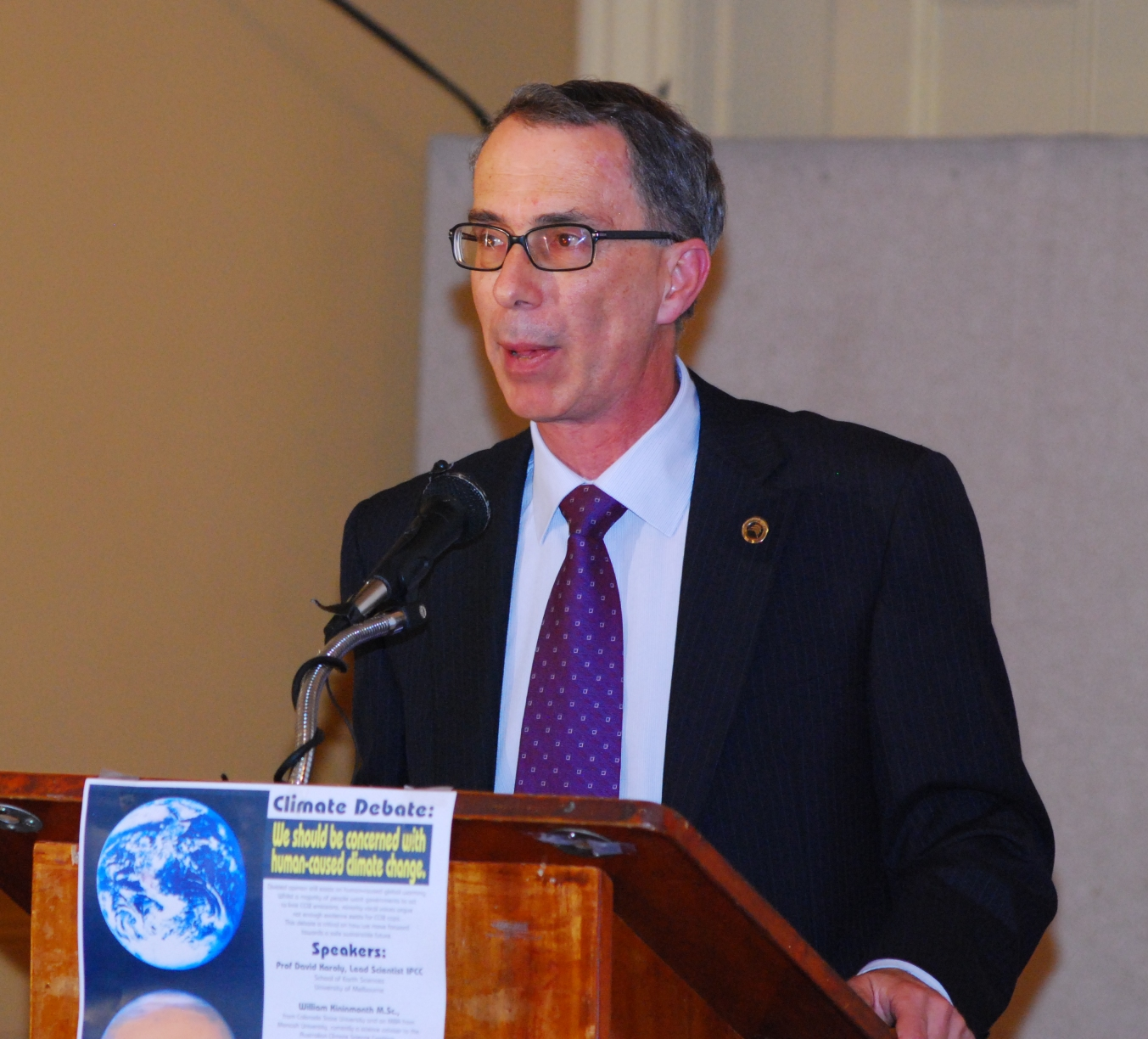
David Karoly is an Australian expert on climate change and member of the board of the Climate Change Authority.

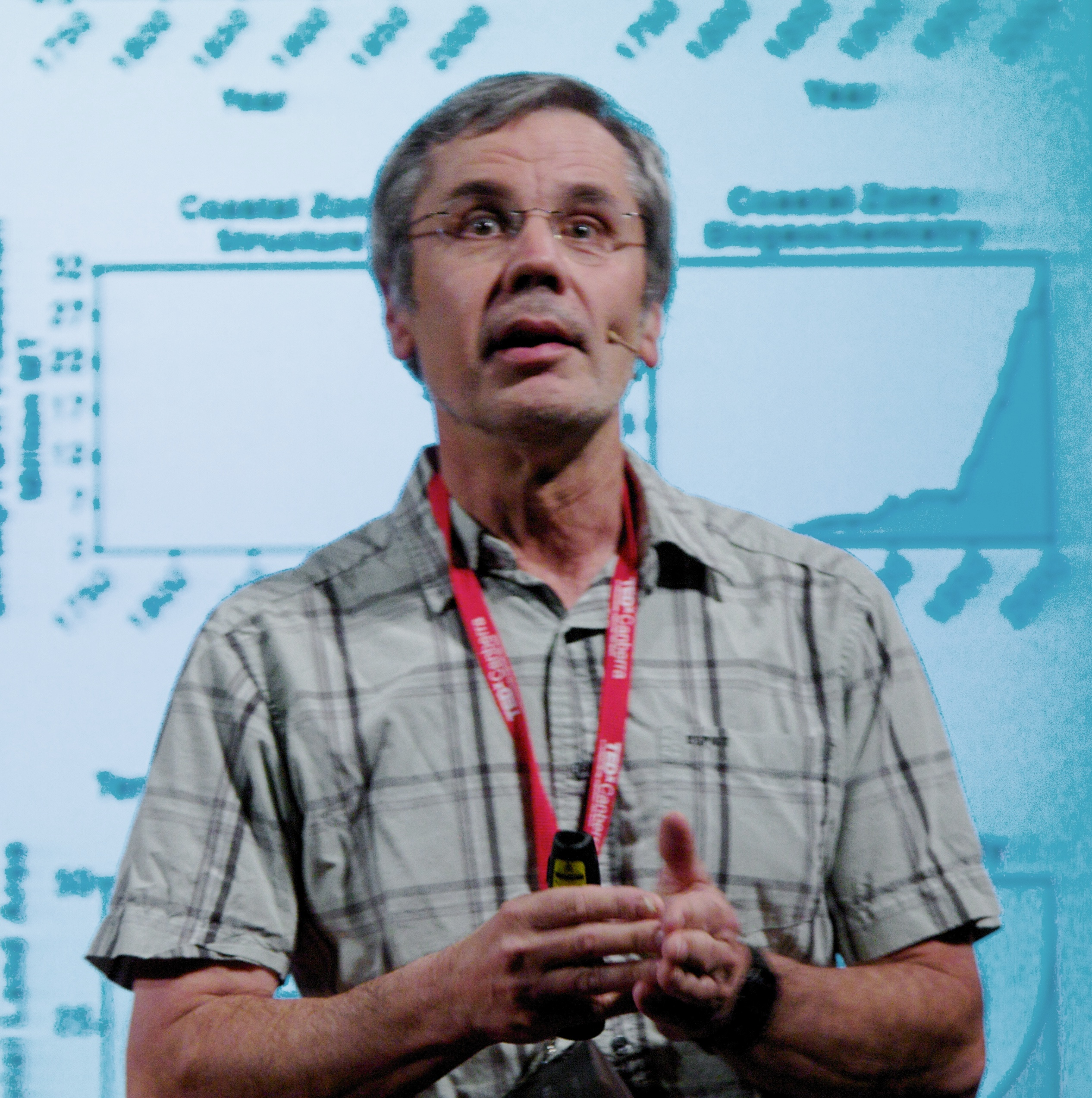
Will Steffen was the principal author of the report The Critical Decade: Extreme Weather.

The Climate Commission was announced by the Gillard Labor government in February 2011. The chief commissioner was Professor Tim Flannery, and other commissioners included Professor Veena Sahajwalla, Professor Lesley Hughes, Professor Will Steffen, Roger Beale, and Gerry Hueston. The commission was projected to cost $5.4 million over four years.

== Actions ==
The Commission released a number of reports on climate change science, health impacts, international action and renewable energy, as well as holding public events around Australia.

=== The Critical Decade ===
The Critical Decade, the commission's first report, summarised the current state of climate science, the likely impacts and the urgency for action. The report found:

"...the global climate is changing and humanity is almost surely the dominant cause. The risks have never been clearer and the case for action has never been more urgent."

The third and final chapter of the report uses a budget approach to estimate the level of greenhouse gas emissions reductions required to keep global temperature below 2 degrees. The budget approach looks at the amount of additional greenhouse gas emissions over a period and calculates the likelihood of a particular temperature rise. For example, to have a 75% change of keeping temperature increase to below 2 degrees, the world can emit no more than 1000 gigatonnes of carbon dioxide between 2000 and 2050.

The report was reviewed favourably by leading Australian climate scientists, including Professor David Karoly, Professor Ove Hoegh-Guldberg and Professor Steven Sherwood.

== Abolition ==
The Climate Commission was abolished in September 2013 by the newly elected Abbott Liberal government, as a stated streamlining and cost-cutting measure. Less than a week later the commission was relaunched as an independent non-profit organisation called the Climate Council, which was to be fully funded by public donations.

== See also ==
- Climate change in Australia
