= No. 19 (Netherlands East Indies) Squadron RAAF =

Joint Netherlands-Australian Royal Australian Air Force squadron during 1945-1947

No. 19 (NEI) Squadron RAAF
- 19 Squadron ML-KNIL
- Active: 1944–1948
- Country: Netherlands East Indies/Australia
- Branch: ML-KNIL (1944–1945); RAAF (1945–1947); ML-KNIL (1947–1948)
- Base: RAAF Archerfield
- Engagements: World War II; Indonesian National Revolution

Commanders
- Notable commanders: Willem Versteegh

19 Squadron ML-KNIL, also known as No. 19 (Netherlands East Indies) Squadron RAAF, was a transport and communications unit of the Royal Netherlands East Indies Army Air Force (MK-KNIL), formed in Australia during the final stages of World War II. The squadron was formed as a Dutch unit in late 1944 from two transport flights that had previously been based in Brisbane and Melbourne, and which had run supplies to joint Australian-NEI combat squadrons in the Northern Territory and in West Papua. Upon formation the squadron was based at Archerfield, near Brisbane. In 1945, it was transferred to the Royal Australian Air Force (RAAF), but returned to Dutch control in 1947 and subsequently took part in operations during the Indonesian National Revolution.

== History ==
The squadron was one of four joint Australian-NEI squadrons formed during the war, and emerged from two separate transport flights formed in September 1944 by the ML-KNIL in Australia. These flights were NEI Transport Section, Brisbane (NEI-TSB), which was based at RAAF Archerfield, near Brisbane and equipped with three Lockheed Lodestars and five North American B-25 Mitchells, and NEI Transport Section, Melbourne (NEI-TSM), which operated nine Lodestars and several Mitchells, and was based at Melbourne. These units transported personnel and material to No. 18 (NEI) Squadron, a joint Australian-NEI bomber squadron based at RAAF Batchelor, Northern Territory, and No. 120 (NEI) Squadron, a fighter unit in Merauke (later in Biak), West Papua.

In September 1944, these two flights were expanded to squadron status and designated Nos. 1 and 2 NEI Transport Squadrons. No. 1 subsequently moved to Brisbane from Melbourne and in November the two were merged at Archerfield, forming No. 1 Netherlands East Indies (NEI) Transport Squadron, operating four Douglas Dakotas, six Lodestars, five Mitchells and five Lockheed Model 12a light transport aircraft. Although the squadron was not officially part of the RAAF at that time, a detachment of 50 RAAF personnel was assigned to it to help make up for personnel shortages, mainly in ground crew. In early 1945, the squadron's area of operations began expanding beyond Australia and Merauke and, as the end of the war became imminent, the Dutch authorities began considering future operations in the East Indies. On 15 August 1945, following a request from Dutch officials, the squadron was officially absorbed by the RAAF and renamed No. 19 (Netherlands East Indies) Squadron. It took control of 13 Dakotas that had previously been operated by the Dutch East Indies airline KNILM, while a further 17 were obtained from the US; of these, 10 were used for flying and the remainder to provide spare parts. There were also four Mitchells, and several Lockheed 12s and Lodestars. Some of the squadron's Dutch crews were transferred from the USAAF 374th Troop Carrier Group, having received training in the US following their escape from the NEI.

Following the end of World War II, the Dutch government requested that the NEI squadrons operating as part of the RAAF participate in the re-occupation of the NEI. In early September 1945, despite South East Asia Command placing restrictions on Dutch aircraft landing in Java due to concerns about escalating tensions with Indonesian nationalists during the withdrawal of Japanese troops, the squadron began flying humanitarian assistance missions, landing at Kemajoran. RAAF staff, the majority of whom were maintenance personnel, were withdrawn from the Dutch squadrons in November 1945. Maintenance was subsequently conducted in Bundaberg, Queensland by Australian civilian companies until May 1946. In 1946, the squadron received several Douglas C-54 Skymasters from the United States. Regular courier flights were later established by the squadron between Brisbane, Darwin and Batavia, and these were also available to civilian passengers. Meanwhile, maintenance was increasingly completed in Batavia using contracted Australian civilian personnel.

19 Squadron remained at Archerfield and continued using Australian callsigns as it undertook operations against Indonesian nationalists during the early stages of the Indonesian National Revolution; in August 1946, it began transferring to Cililitan airfield, near Jakarta, although it continued to maintain its headquarters at Archerfield. The issue of the involvement of RAAF personnel in Dutch operations to reoccupy the NEI was politically sensitive as there was growing anti-colonial sentiment both in Australia and also in Britain and the United States. Nevertheless, the squadron operated as part of the RAAF for over a year, even when there was growing resistance in Australian society, particularly within the labour movement, to assisting the Dutch. It officially ceased to be part of the RAAF on 1 January 1947, and was transferred back to Dutch control for further service in the campaign against the nationalists. On 26 February 1947, a Dakota operated by the squadron crashed into the sea off Point Lookout, near Stradbroke Island in Queensland, killing all six people on board.

The squadron was officially dissolved on 1 April 1948, when its aircraft were transferred to 20 Squadron ML-KNIL, a sister transport unit formed in 1946. (While some sources have described this as a "renaming" of 19 Squadron, the prior and separate existence of 20 Squadron would indicate otherwise.)

== Bibliography ==
- Casius, Gerard J. (2002). "The Use of Air Power in the National Liberation Struggle in Indonesia 1945–49". In Brent, Keith (ed.). RAAF History Conference 2002: Air Power and Wars of National Liberation. Canberra: Aerospace Centre. pp. 65–96. ISBN 0642265798.
- Clark, Chris, ed. (2011). 90 Years of the RAAF: A Snapshot History. Canberra: Air Power Development Centre. ISBN 9781920800567.
- Hurst, Doug (2001). The Fourth Ally: The Dutch Forces in Australia in WWII. Chapman, Australian Capital Territory: D. Hurst. ISBN 9780957925205.
- Jonker, K. W. (2005–2017). "North American B-25C/D and B-25J/K Mitchell: NEIAF", Nederlandse Modelbouw en Luchtvaartsite (web page).
- Peters, Nonja (2006). The Dutch Down Under: 1606–2006. Crawley, Western Australia: University of Western Australia Press. ISBN 9781920694753.
- Somberg, H. A. (12 November 2013). "Versteegh, William Carel Johan (1886–1975)". Netherlands Biographical Dictionary (in Dutch). The Hague: Huygens Institute.
- Weers, Mozes W. (1985). "Military Affairs Abroad: Seventy Years of Netherlands Air Force History". Air University Review (May–June 1985). Maxwell Air Force Base, Alabama: Department of the Air Force. ISSN 0002-2594. Archived from the original on 27 February 2001.
