= 120 Squadron =

120 Squadron may refer to:

- 120 Squadron (Israel), a unit of the Israeli Air Force
- 120 Squadron, Republic of Singapore Air Force
- 120 Squadron SAAF, a unit of the South African Air Force
- 120th Fighter Squadron, a unit of the Colorado Air National Guard
- No. 120 (Netherlands East Indies) Squadron RAAF, a join Dutch and Australian unit
- No. 120 Squadron RAF, a unit of the United Kingdom Royal Air Force
- No. 120 Squadron RNLAF, a unit of the Royal Netherlands Air Force
