= No. 120 Squadron RNLAF =

120 Squadron Royal Netherlands Air Force
- Active: 1946–1950; 1961–1983
- Branch: Netherlands East Indies Air Force (1946–1950); Royal Netherlands Air Force (1961–1983)
- Type: Fighter (1946–1950); Air defence (1961–1983)
- Equipment: Nike Hercules (1961–1983)
- Engagements: Indonesian National Revolution

Aircraft flown
- Fighter: P-40 Kittyhawk (1946–1949); P-51 Mustang (1949-1950)

120 Squadron was a Netherlands East Indies Air Force unit which was later re-raised part of the Royal Netherlands Air Force. The squadron was first formed in December 1943 as part of the Royal Australian Air Force (RAAF), and saw combat in and around New Guinea during 1944 and 1945 equipped with P-40 Kittyhawk fighters. No. 120 Squadron was transferred to the Netherlands East Indies Air Force in 1946 and attacked Indonesian forces during the Indonesian National Revolution. It was disbanded in 1950 as a result of the Dutch–Indonesian Round Table Conference, but was re-formed in 1961 as an air defence unit. 120 Squadron was disbanded in 1983.

== History ==
No. 120 (Netherlands East Indies) Squadron RAAF was formed in 1943 and was manned by Dutch pilots and Australian ground crew. Following the end of World War II The Dutch wished to move No. 18 and No. 120 Squadrons to Java. To facilitate this the RAAF element of the squadron was disbanded on 30 October 1945. The last RAAF personnel left the squadron in February 1946 and No. 120 Squadron was assigned to the Netherlands East Indies Air Force (NEIAF) on 20 June, thereby ending its relationship with the RAAF.

No. 120 Squadron saw combat against Indonesian forces during the Indonesian National Revolution. It remained at Biak until April 1946, when it was deployed to Cililitan near Jakarta. The British-led South East Asia Command, which was responsible for the western NEI at the time, ordered that the squadron proceed to Surabaya where it relieved Royal Air Force P-47 Thunderbolts. During the second half of the year No. 120 Squadron flew 125 combat sorties, during which five of its Kittyhawks were damaged by ground fire. The British left the NEI near the end of 1946; as at December that year the squadron was located at Semarang.

In late July 1947 the Dutch launched their first police action, called Operation Product, which aimed to capture important economic facilities in the NEI. This campaign was also referred to as the First Police Action. At this time No. 120 Squadron was still located at Semarang and was equipped with nine Kittyhawks instead of the 19 it was authorised. Early in this operation the squadron attacked Solo and Madiun and claimed to have destroyed eight Indonesian aircraft on the ground. A strike on Jakarta was delayed by fog; this may have saved the life of Indonesian Prime Minister Sutan Sjahrir as he left the city on board a C-47 Dakota transport at about the time the Kittyhawks were originally scheduled to arrive. During the First Police Action No. 120 Squadron, like the other units of the NEIAF, provided support to Army units. The First Police Action ended on 4 August, though NEIAF aircraft continued to attack Indonesian positions.

On 19 December 1948 the Dutch launched a second police action, called Operation Kraai, which involved offensives in western Java and Sumatra. This campaign lasted until 9 January 1949; during this time No. 120 Squadron's Kittyhawks flew 183 sorties though four aircraft were lost. In early 1949 the squadron was reequipped with P-51 Mustang fighters, and it had nine of these aircraft but only six pilots in April. In July 1949 the Dutch and Indonesians agreed to a ceasefire, and the war ended in December with the Dutch handing over sovereignty to the Republic of the United States of Indonesia. As part of this settlement the NEIAF was transferred to the new republic, though the Dutch retained No. 18 and 120 Squadrons for as long as possible. No. 120 Squadron ceased to exist on 1 March 1950.

In November 1961 the unit was re-formed as 120 Squadron of the Royal Netherlands Air Force. The squadron was equipped with Nike-Hercules surface to air missiles and formed part of 1 Guided Missile Wing (Groep Geleide Wapens; GGW) along with 118, 119 and 121 Squadrons. The Nike-Hercules missiles were armed with nuclear warheads and were provided to the Netherlands and other NATO countries by the United States. From August 1964, 120 Squadron was stationed at Borgholzhausen in West Germany. It was transferred to 12 GGW in May 1975 but remained at Borgholzhausen. 12 GGW also included 118, 220 and 223 Squadrons. The squadron was disbanded during 1983.
