= No. 119 (Netherlands East Indies) Squadron RAAF =

Joint Netherlands-Australian Royal Australian Air Force squadron during 1943

No. 119 (NEI) Squadron RAAF
- Active: 1943
- Allegiance: Australia and The Netherlands
- Branch: Royal Australian Air Force
- Type: Bomber

Insignia
- Squadron code: MV

Aircraft flown
- Bomber: B-25 Mitchell
- Transport: Lodestar

No. 119 (Netherlands East Indies) Squadron was a joint Dutch and Australian squadron of World War II which formed part of the Royal Australian Air Force (RAAF). The squadron was formed in September 1943 but could not be made operational due to a shortage of Dutch personnel. As a result, it was disbanded in December 1943.

== History ==
No. 119 (NEI) Squadron was raised at Canberra on 1 September 1943. As a joint Australian-Dutch unit it was intended that the Dutch authorities would provide all the squadron's aircrew and aircraft while the RAAF would provide its ground crew. Once formed No. 119 (NEI) Squadron was to operate alongside No. 18 (Netherlands East Indies) Squadron RAAF, which had been formed on the same basis in April 1942 and was flying operations against the Japanese from Australia's Northern Territory under RAAF command as part of the North Western Area Campaign.

Personnel began to be assigned to the squadron from 1 September, though its commanding officer, Squadron Leader E.C. Rutter, was not appointed until the 16th of the month. By the end of September the squadron had a strength of 11 Netherlands East Indies officers and 14 other ranks as well as three Australian officers and 32 other ranks. It was loaned two B-25 Mitchell bombers and a Lodestar transport, but there is no record of these aircraft being flown while assigned to the squadron.

Due to a shortage of Dutch personnel it was decided to disband No. 119 (NEI) Squadron in late 1943, before the unit had become operational. Accordingly, the squadron was disbanded at Canberra on 10 December. The concise history of the squadron published by the RAAF Historical Section states that its personnel were posted to the newly formed No. 120 (Netherlands East Indies) Squadron RAAF while an essay by historian Albert Palazzo published on the Australian War Memorial's website states that they were transferred to No. 18 (NEI) Squadron.
