= No. 18 (Netherlands East Indies) Squadron RAAF =

1942-1950 Royal Australian Air Force unit

No. 18 (NEI) Squadron RAAF
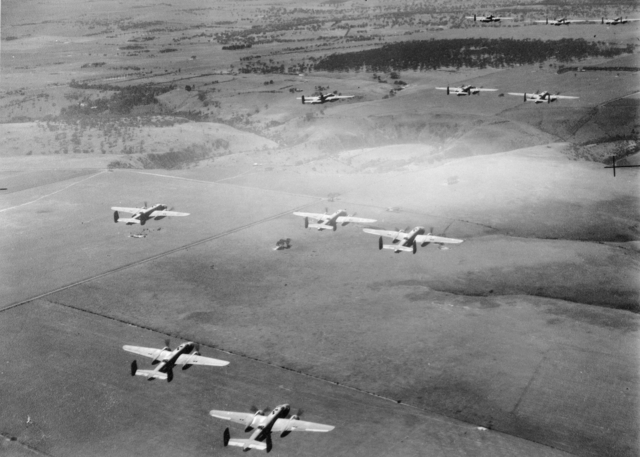
- B-25 Mitchell formation near their base in Canberra, Australia, 1942
- Active: 1942–1945; 1946–1950
- Country: Australia (1942–1945); Netherlands (1946–1950)
- Branch: Royal Australian Air Force; Royal Netherlands Air Force
- Base: RAAF Station Canberra; MacDonald, Northern Territory; Batchelor, Northern Territory; Tjililitan, Java
- Engagements: World War II; Indonesian National Revolution

Aircraft flown
- Bomber: A-20 Havoc (1942); B-25 Mitchell (1942–1950)

No. 18 (Netherlands East Indies) Squadron was a joint Dutch and Australian bomber squadron of World War II. Formed in April 1942, the squadron was staffed by a mixture of Dutch and Australian personnel and placed under Royal Australian Air Force operational command. Initially it undertook anti-submarine patrols on the east coast of Australia, before moving to northern Australia and taking part in operations against the Japanese in the islands of the Netherlands East Indies (NEI). At the conclusion of hostilities, the squadron came under Dutch control and Australian personnel were transferred out. The squadron then undertook operations during the Indonesian National Revolution, before eventually being disbanded in July 1950 after being transferred to Indonesia.

== History ==
=== World War II ===
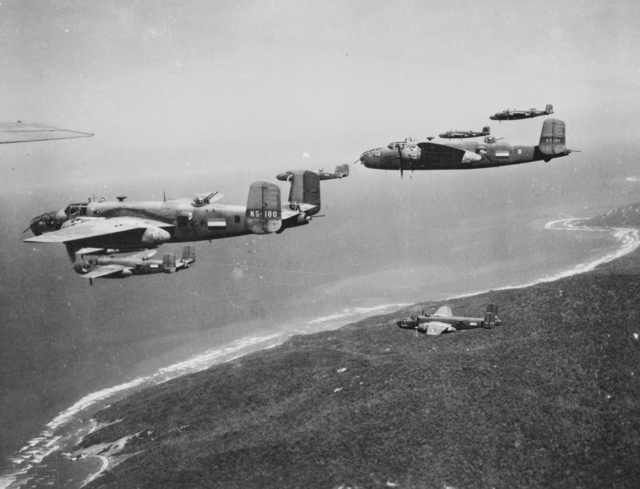
B-25 Mitchell bombers from No. 18 (NEI) Squadron flying in formation near Darwin in 1943

No. 18 (NEI) Squadron was formed at RAAF Station Canberra on 4 April 1942, under the operational command of the Royal Australian Air Force's No. 79 Wing. Like the other two joint Australian-Dutch squadrons – Nos. 119 and 120 Squadrons – the Dutch authorities provided No. 18 Squadron's pilots and aircraft, which had been obtained from the United States via the Lend Lease program. The majority of the aircrew were Dutchmen who had been evacuated from the Netherlands East Indies after the Japanese invasion, while most of the groundcrew were Australian. Unlike the other two squadrons, however, the RAAF also provided many aircrew to the squadron: on formation there was a total of 242 Dutch and Javanese personnel and 266 Australian personnel; all aircraft were captained by a Dutch officer, while the remaining aircrew positions were filled by a mixture of Dutch and Australian personnel. The squadron was commanded overall by a Dutch officer throughout the war; but the unique situation of having Dutch and Australian members meant that Dutch personnel were administered under Dutch regulations, while the Australian component was administered and commanded separately by an Australian officer of the rank of squadron leader. The squadron's aircraft were painted with Dutch flags, instead of RAAF markings.

No. 18 (NEI) Squadron received its first five B-25 Mitchell medium bombers in April 1942. These aircraft were used for both training and anti-submarine patrols. While the squadron briefly operated 10 A-20 Havoc light bombers in early 1942, it was fully equipped with 18 B-25s by 21 September 1942, following what was wrongly believed to have been a successful attack by one of the squadron's Mitchells, piloted by Captain Guus Winckel, on a Japanese submarine off the New South Wales coast near Moruya in June.

On 4 December 1942, No. 18 (NEI) Squadron deployed to a partially constructed MacDonald Airfield in the Northern Territory to operate in the North Western Area. After a period of further training, the squadron began flying operational missions in early January 1943 and was primarily tasked with reconnaissance flights and raids on Japanese ships and bases in the occupied NEI, focusing on East Timor, and on Tanimbar and Kai Island. While the squadron suffered considerable casualties in these raids, it did not receive any replacement crews until September 1943 when new and more heavily armed B-25s were delivered along with fresh crews who had been trained at a Dutch flying school in the United States.

No. 18 (NEI) Squadron relocated from MacDonald to Batchelor in May 1943. As the Japanese presence in the eastern NEI declined, the Dutch authorities requested that No. 18 (NEI) Squadron be re-equipped with longer ranged B-24 Liberator heavy bombers, but was declined and the squadron continued to operate B-25s. Throughout 1943, the squadron undertook further reconnaissance missions and attacks on Japanese shipping around the NEI, before shifting focus in November 1943 and March 1944 upon Japanese supply routes to north-eastern Papua New Guinea, during which the squadron sank over 25,000 tons of Japanese shipping. Part of the squadron was detached to Exmouth, Western Australia in March 1944, in response to Allied intelligence that a Japanese attack on Fremantle or Perth was likely, but it returned to Batchelor shortly afterwards after which the squadron attacked targets in the NEI for the remainder of the year, focusing especially on Japanese airfields. Anti-shipping attacks were also undertaken, and on one raid around Tioor Island on 23 June, the squadron's commanding officer, Lieutenant Colonel E.J.G. Te Roller, was killed.

In February 1945, part of the squadron was moved to New Britain, where it was based at Jacquinot Bay, as part of a plan to relocate the entire squadron. On 7th April, the squadron took part in an attack that damaged the Japanese cruiser Isuzu north of Sumbawa. The cruiser was sunk later that day by American submarines. The detachment on New Britain was moved to Morotai Island in June after the plan to move the squadron to New Britain was reversed following Dutch appeals to be sent to the NEI instead. The following month, the whole squadron was relocated to Balikpapan in Borneo, which had recently been liberated following the Battle of Balikpapan. After arriving at Balikpapan the squadron's main task was to drop propaganda leaflets and locate and drop supplies to Allied personnel in prison camps throughout the NEI. It also provided support to an Australian amphibious landing on Makassar in late September 1945, after the conclusion of hostilities with Japan. During World War II, No. 18 (NEI) Squadron flew over 900 operation sorties; 102 airmen were killed, including 25 Australians.

=== Post World War II ===
The RAAF component of No. 18 (NEI) Squadron was disbanded on 25 November 1945 and the squadron passed to Dutch control on 15 January 1946. The squadron relocated to Tjililitan in Java on 9 March 1946 and saw active service against Indonesian Nationalists during the Indonesian National Revolution flying a variety of missions including reconnaissance, bombing and close support to Dutch troops fighting against the Indonesians. Following the end of Dutch rule, No. 18 Squadron was the last squadron to be handed over to the Indonesians and was disbanded on 26 July 1950. A total of 4,000 personnel from 38 nationalities served in the squadron during the eight years it existed.

== Aircraft operated ==
No. 18 (NEI) Squadron operated the following aircraft:

From	To	Aircraft
1942	1942	A-20 Havoc
1942	1950	B-25 Mitchell

== Squadron bases ==
The squadron operated from the following airfields:

From	To	Base
4 July 1942	4 December 1942	RAAF Station Fairbairn
4 December 1942	9 May 1943	MacDonald Airfield, Northern Territory
9 May 1943	15 July 1945	Batchelor, Northern Territory
15 July 1945	9 March 1946	Manggar Airfield, Borneo

== Commanding officers ==
Officers commanding No. 18 (NEI) Squadron were as follows:

From	To	Name
21 April 1942	1 May 1942	Captain W.F. Boot
1 May 1942	11 June 1943	Lieutenant Colonel B.J. Fiedeldij
11 June 1943	2 April 1944	Lieutenant Colonel J.J. Zomer
2 April 1944	23 June 1944	Lieutenant Colonel E.J.G. te Roller
1 July 1944	7 October 1944	Lieutenant Colonel D.L. Asjes
7 October 1944	13 June 1945	Lieutenant Colonel J.M. van Haselen
13 June 1945	15 January 1946	Lieutenant Colonel R.E. Jessurun

== Bibliography ==
- "No. 18 (NEI) Squadron, RAAF". Allies in Adversity. Australian War Memorial.
- "18 (NEI) Squadron RAAF". Second World War 1939–1945 units. Australian War Memorial.
- "18 Squadron". RAAF Museum.
- Barnes, Norman (2000). The RAAF and the Flying Squadrons. St Leonards, New South Wales: Allen & Unwin. ISBN 1-86508-130-2.
- Dunn, Peter. "Netherlands East Indies Air Force in Australia During World War 2". Oz at War.
- Hurst, Doug. "The NEI Naval and Air support in the Battle for Australia". Navy League of Australia.
- RAAF Historical Section (1995). Units of the Royal Australian Air Force: A Concise History Volume 3: Bomber Units. Canberra, Australian Capital Territory: Australian Government Publishing Service. ISBN 9780644427968.
- Wallace, Gordon (1983). Up in Darwin With the Dutch: A Tribute to the Mitchell Bomber Boys. Ringwood, Victoria: Rossprint. ISBN 0-9591254-0-X.
- Zwanenburg, Gerrie J. (April 1965). "No. 18 (N.E.I) Squadron". Air Pictorial. Vol. 27, no. 4. pp. 124–126.
