= No. 120 (Netherlands East Indies) Squadron RAAF =

Joint Netherlands-Australian Royal Australian Air Force squadron during 1943-1946

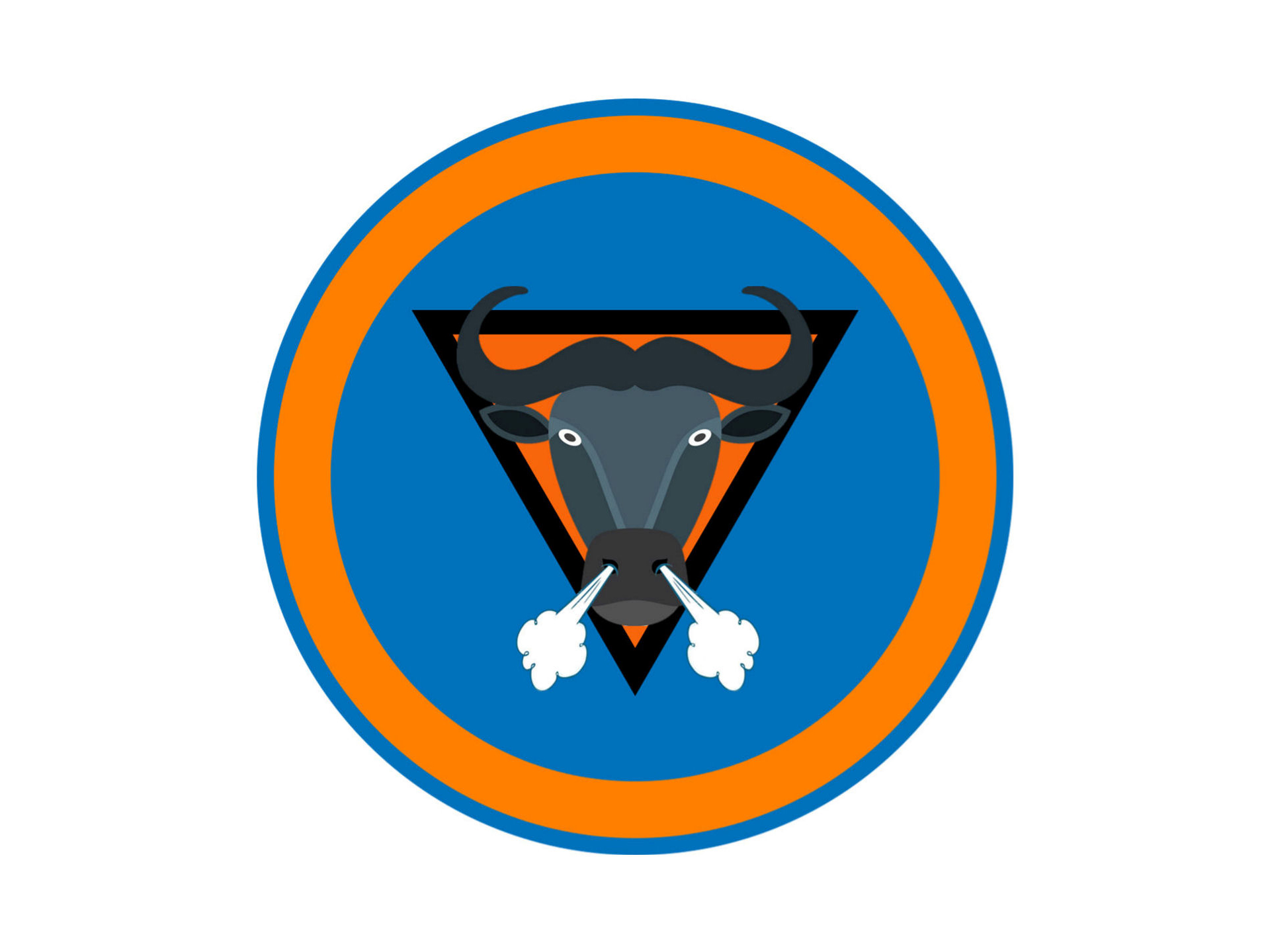
- Active: 1943–1946
- Allegiance: Australia and the Netherlands
- Branch: Royal Australian Air Force
- Type: Fighter
- Engagements: World War II, Indonesian National Revolution

Aircraft flown
- Fighter: P-40 Kittyhawk
- Trainer: CAC Wirraway (1944)

No. 120 Squadron was a joint Dutch and Australian squadron of World War II. The squadron was first formed in December 1943 as part of the Royal Australian Air Force (RAAF), and saw combat in and around New Guinea during 1944 and 1945 equipped with P-40 Kittyhawk fighters. Following the war, No. 120 Squadron was transferred to the Netherlands East Indies Air Force in 1946 and participated in the Indonesian National Revolution.

== History ==
No. 120 (Netherlands East Indies) Squadron was formed at RAAF Station Fairbairn in Canberra on 10 December 1943. As a joint Australian-Dutch unit, the Dutch authorities provided all the squadron's aircrew and aircraft while the RAAF provided its ground crew. This arrangement had been previously used for No. 18 (NEI) Squadron and the short-lived No. 119 (NEI) Squadron. It was originally intended that once formed, No. 120 (NEI) Squadron would be deployed to northern Australia and operate alongside No. 18 (NEI) Squadron. However, it was later decided to deploy the unit to Merauke on the south coast of New Guinea, which formed part of the pre-war Netherlands East Indies (NEI).

The Squadron completed its training in early 1944. During December 1943, the No. 120 (NEI) Squadron pilots who had been trained in the United States received training at No. 2 Operational Conversion Unit to familiarise them with RAAF procedures. The squadron acquired its full complement of P-40 Kittyhawk fighters by 22 January 1944; at this time it was manned by 28 Dutch pilots and 213 RAAF personnel. In mid-March 1944 No. 120 (NEI) Squadron made an emergency deployment to 'Potshot' airfield in Western Australia in response to a feared Japanese attack on the Perth area. The squadron's aircraft began to depart Fairbairn on 9 March and returned on the 28th of the month after the crisis had passed.

No. 120 (NEI) Squadron began moving from Canberra to Merauke in early April 1944. Its main party arrived at Merauke on 7 May and the squadron was declared operational two days later. After a period of training, No. 120 (NEI) Squadron began flying combat missions in late June. Due to the limited Japanese presence in the region, the missions were limited to strafing attacks on Japanese positions as well attacks on small craft off the coast of New Guinea. Several aircraft were lost during these operations. While the other RAAF units at Merauke were redeployed in late 1944, No. 120 (NEI) Squadron remained at the town and proposed moves to Horn Island and Cape York did not eventuate. During October, it was decided to move the squadron, along with the other two units of No. 79 Wing (No. 2 Squadron and No. 18 (NEI) Squadron) to New Britain to support Australian Army operations there. While the wing was issued with orders to move to New Britain on 31 December, this was delayed as the planned airfield at Jacquinot Bay could not be made ready until March. No. 120 (NEI) Squadron became non-operational on 14 February 1945, though some of its pilots were temporarily attached to No. 77 Squadron. The squadron departed Merauke on 14 April 1945 bound for Darwin, Northern Territory, where it would join up with the rest of No. 79 Wing before proceeding to Jacquinot Bay.

In early 1945 the Dutch authorities had requested that the two NEI squadrons in the RAAF be used in operations over the NEI, and this was agreed to by the Australian military. As a result, when No. 79 Wing arrived at Jacquinot Bay on 9 May, No. 120 (NEI) Squadron was separated from the unit and ordered to proceed to Biak. The remainder of the wing was assigned to the First Tactical Air Force, and took part in the Borneo Campaign. No. 120 (NEI) Squadron's seaborne echelon arrived at Biak on 21 May 1945, but its aircraft and personnel did not complete the move until 10 June. The squadron was declared operational on 12 June.

No. 120 (NEI) Squadron conducted combat operations over northern New Guinea during the last weeks of the war. During June it bombed Japanese positions in the Vogelkop Peninsula and Geelvink Bay areas, attacked Japanese barges and flew reconnaissance sorties over Mansin Island. In July the squadron moved to Middleburg and attacked Japanese positions alongside the Beaufort-equipped No. 15 Squadron. Three No. 120 (NEI) Squadron fighters were shot down during an attack on 30 July, and a further two aircraft were lost in early August. It continued these operations until the end of the war on 15 August. At this time, 88 members of the squadron's personnel were Dutch and the unit was located at Biak. Had the war continued, the squadron would have become part of No. 11 Group RAAF, which had been formed in mid-July to take over responsibility for garrison duties in Borneo and the eastern islands of the NEI. As part of this group No. 120 (NEI) Squadron would have supported United States Army forces in the Biak area.

Following the end of the war, the squadron continued to fly surveillance and escort flights over northern New Guinea during September and October 1945. The Dutch wished to move No. 18 and No. 120 Squadrons to Java, however, and to facilitate this the RAAF element of the squadron was disbanded on 30 October 1945. The last RAAF personnel left the squadron in February 1946 and No. 120 Squadron was assigned to the Netherlands East Indies Air Force (NEIAF) on 20 June, thereby ending its relationship with the RAAF. The squadron retained its designation of No. 120 Squadron of the NEIF, and saw combat in the Indonesian National Revolution. It was disbanded on 1 March 1950 following the Dutch defeat. The unit was re-formed as 120 Squadron of the Royal Netherlands Air Force in 1961 as an air defence unit equipped with nuclear-tipped Nike-Hercules surface to air missiles and continued in this role until it was disbanded during 1983.
