= Lauri Pekuri =

Finnish flying ace

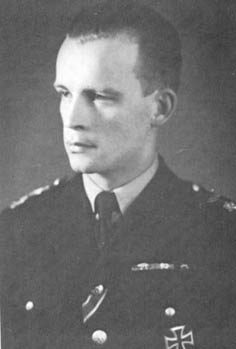
- Born: 6 November 1916; Helsinki, Finland
- Died: 3 August 1999 (aged 82); Spain
- Military career
- Allegiance: Finland
- Branch: Air Force
- Service years: 1939–1968
- Rank: Colonel
- Nicknames: "Crépe" and "Stan Laurel"
- Units: No. 24 Sqn; No. 34 Sqn
- Commands: Karelia Air Command
- Conflicts: World War II; Winter War; Continuation War

Lauri Olavi Pekuri (né Ohukainen; 6 November 1916, in Helsinki, Finland - 3 August 1999, in Spain) was a Finnish Air Force ace and jet aircraft pioneer as well as the first Finnish pilot to break the sound barrier. In 1942, Pekuri changed his name from Ohukainen. This older name can still be found in aviation literature.

== Early history ==
Pekuri began flying as a youth in Helsinki in the 1930s. He left college to participate in the White Guards and to practice sports. On his first attempt to join the Air Force, he failed in the psychological tests and due to his insufficient academic record. Instead, he became an NCO at the Mikkeli artillery battery. In 1939, he tried out again for the Air Force and was admitted. He had then completed his interrupted college studies.

== Fighter pilot ==
Pekuri was sent to Parola and Tyrväntö during the Winter War, where he got to fly second-line Gloster Gamecocks, Bristol Bulldogs and ASJA Jaktfalk fighters. He managed to accumulate about 100 flying hours.

After the Winter War, he applied to the officer's school. In 1941, he was sent to Hävittäjälentolaivue 24, which flew Brewster Buffaloes. In order to fly these fighters, he trained on Fokker D.XXIs. On 4 October 1941, Pekuri fought his first air battle against a Soviet I-153 fighter, which crashed mainly due to pilot error. Pekuri continued to better his kill statistics over the following years.

On 25 June 1942, Pekuri participated in a large aerial battle over the Soviet Sekehe airfield. He managed to down two Soviet Hawker Hurricanes, but his Brewster Buffalo (BW-372) was also hit, and he was forced to make an emergency landing on a lake. He made it safely to his own lines, but the aircraft sank to the bottom. The aircraft was located and recovered in the 1990s; it is one of the only few surviving Brewster Buffalos to date. In the fights over Sekehe, the Soviets lost seven aircraft.

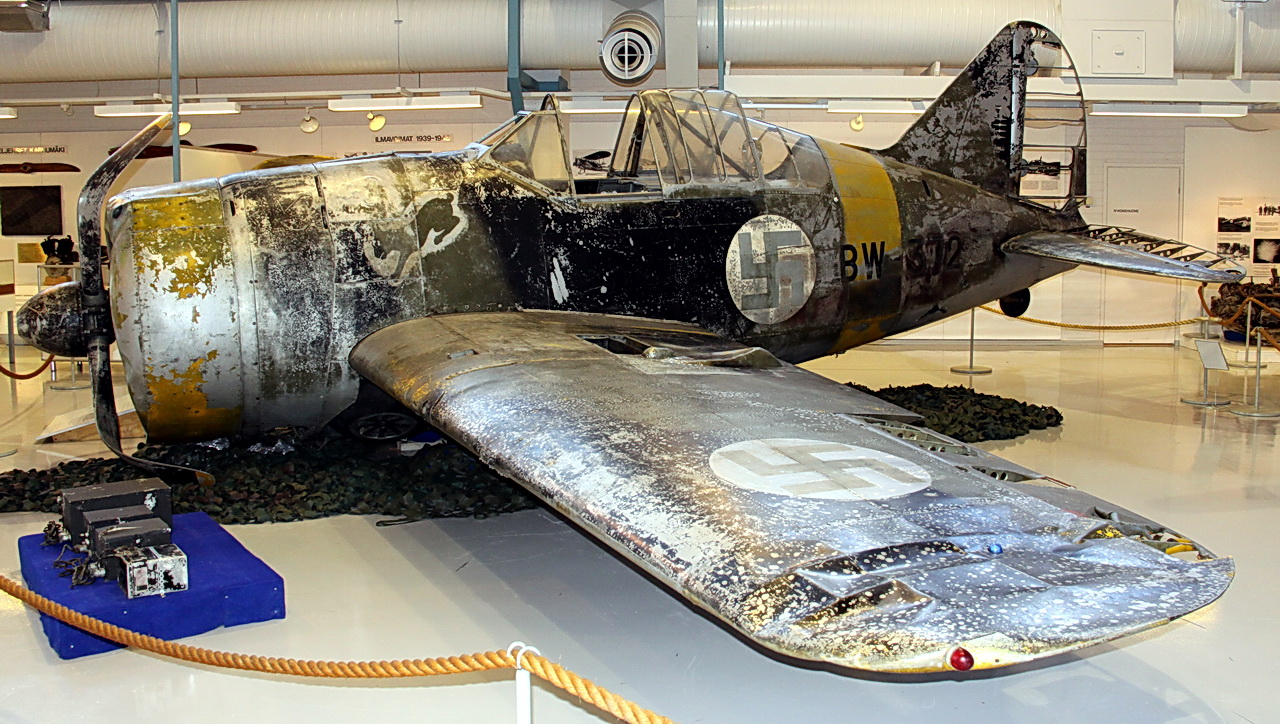
Pekuri's FAF BW-372 on display at the Aviation Museum of Central Finland

In February 1943, Pekuri participated in the obtaining of Messerschmitt Bf 109G-2 fighters from Germany. The aircraft were transported from Neustadt, near Vienna. The Germans were surprised that not one single plane was destroyed during transport, when they themselves suffered losses of up to 20% since they employed less qualified pilots to do the work.

During a flight from Immola to Lappeenranta on 16 June 1944, Pekuri's aircraft was damaged while engaging an Ilyushin Il-2. The engine stopped, and he had to bail out behind enemy lines. He wandered for over a week towards his own lines, but was finally captured and sent to a prison in Leningrad. He was released in December 1944. After medical quarantine and recovery, he returned to his squadron. Contrary to the original plans, this squadron of Bf 109s did not participate in the Lapland War due to a similar type used by the Germans, and the dangers of misidentification.

Pekuri achieved 18.5 victories in World War II (12.5 with Buffaloes and 6 with Bf 109s).

After World War II, Pekuri rejoined the Air Force and took part in its transformation into the new jet age. He became the first Finn to break the sound barrier, in an RAF Folland Gnat F.1 numbered GN-101, while flying in passive glide in Finnish airspace. He flew and evaluated Folland Gnats and was responsible for ensuring the purchased fighters fulfilled the terms of the agreement.

After the purchase of Gnats had been completed, Pekuri evaluated the MiG-19 fighter. In his report, he recommended against purchasing the aircraft. The main reasons given were that the weapons were insufficient (giving the impression that no air-to-air missiles were usable) and that manufacturing had been terminated in favour of soon-to-be Mach 2-class fighters already planned for the Soviet air force.

Pekuri also participated in the evaluation of MiG-21 fighters that were to be purchased by the Finnish Air Force. Pekuri planned the training for the type based on Soviet training, both theoretical and practical, given to a group of pilots, including himself. The fighters were transferred to Finland by Soviet pilots, which was on the terms of the purchase.

During evaluations of future fighters, Pekuri was the first Finnish pilot to break Mach 2 while flying a Dassault Mirage III. Pekuri finally retired in 1968 with the rank of colonel, having commanded the Karelian Wing.

After his military career, Pekuri worked in civilian aviation, as the manager of the aviation maintenance training for Wihuri Oy. In the 1980s, he moved to Spain, where he wrote his memoirs. He lived there until his passing on 3 August 1999.

== Sources ==
- Keskinen, Kalevi; Stenman, Kari and Niska, Klaus. Hävittäjä-ässät (Finnish Fighter Aces). Espoo, Finland: Tietoteas, 1978. ISBN 951-9035-37-0. (Finnish)
- Pekuri, Lauri: Tasavallan kauppamiehenä (?)
- Pekuri, Lauri: Spalernajan vanki, (WSOY, 1993)
- Pekuri, Lauri: Hävittäjälentäjä, (WSOY: Juva 2006)
- Stenman, Kari and Keskinen, Kalevi. Finnish Aces of World War 2 (Aircraft of the Aces 23). Oxford, UK: Osprey Publishing, 1998. ISBN 1-85532-783-X.
