= Buffaloes Over Singapore =

Buffaloes Over Singapore: RAF, RAAF, RNZAF and Dutch Brewster Fighters in Action Over Malaya and the East Indies 1941–1942
- Author: Brian Cull, Paul Sortenhaus & Mark Haselden
- Publisher: Grub Street Publishing
- Publication date: 2003
- ISBN: 978-1-904010-32-6

Buffaloes Over Singapore: RAF, RAAF, RNZAF and Dutch Brewster Fighters in Action Over Malaya and the East Indies 1941–1942 is a 2003 book by Brian Cull, Paul Sortenhaus & Mark Haselden. It relates the history of Brewster Buffalo and Brewster 339 fighter squadrons of the British commonwealth and Netherlands East Indies, that fought in the Japanese invasion during 1941-1942, Battle of Singapore and Netherlands East Indies.
