= Brewster XA-32 =

American attack aircraft

XA-32
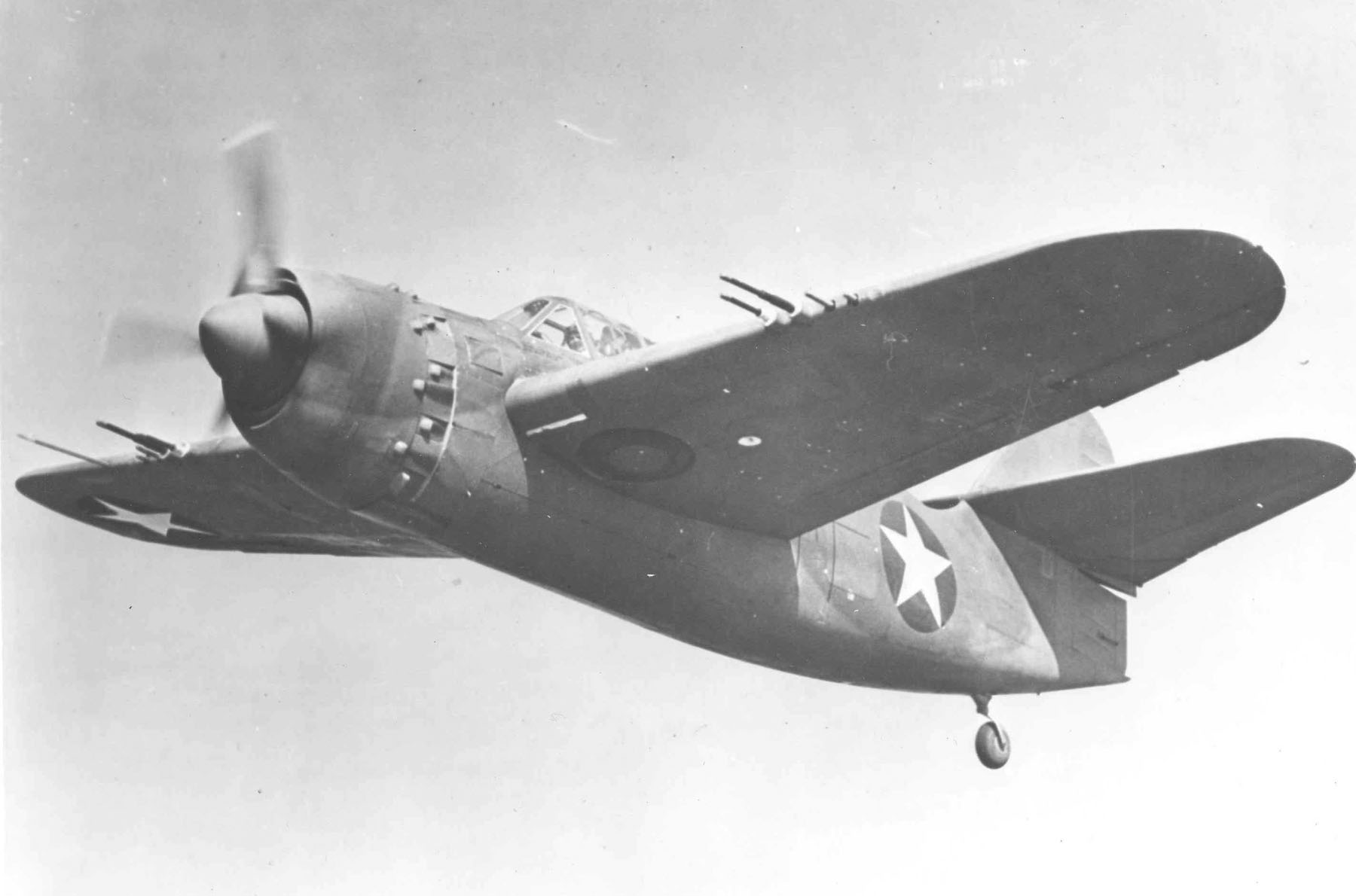
- Brewster XA-32 during testing c. 1943 (U.S. Air Force photo)

General information
- Type: Single seat attack aircraft
- National origin: United States
- Manufacturer: Brewster Aeronautical Corporation
- Primary user: United States Army Air Forces (intended)
- Number built: 2

History
- First flight: 22 May 1943
- Retired: 1944

The Brewster XA-32 was an American attack aircraft, a mid-wing type with an internal bomb bay. The prototype had an P&W R-2800 radial engine, but was grossly overweight. After a dismal set of test results, the XA-32 did not enter production.

== Design and development ==
On September 6, 1941, the US Army issued a requirement for a dive bomber after receiving war reports in 1940 that analyzed the German Junkers Ju 87 dive bombers in combat. The new dive bomber was intended to replace a rear gunner with heavy armor, enabling it to withstand significant damage in air-to-air combat engagements.

Brewster Aeronautical Corporation secured a contract to build a prototype. Brewster's F2A Buffalo won the first Navy monoplane fighter competition over Grumman's F4F-2 Wildcat. The company continued to design and produce lackluster aircraft, and the XA-32, despite a sound layout, became a compendium of management-induced faults. Missing production deadline dates and constant changes to the design jeopardized a promising design (at least on paper).

Initially designed in 1941-42, the XA-32 featured an all-metal construction and was loosely based on the XSB2A-1 design. The drag induced by its bulbous shape was amplified by careless detail design, which left it festooned with bumps and lumps. One disastrous characteristic was that the exhaust scoops that ringed the cowling nearly blinded the test pilots during night flying; the backfiring at low power settings resulted in flames engulfing the nose of the aircraft.

The XA-32’s massive shortcoming was that it was grossly overweight, at almost 13,000 lb (5,900 kg) empty, similar to the twin-engine Douglas A-20 Havoc. Even with the 2,100 hp (1,600 kW) Pratt & Whitney R-2800, the XA-32 was underpowered and an attempt to re-engine the aircraft with the 3,000 hp (2,200 kW) Pratt & Whitney R-4360 Wasp Major was unsuccessful.

== Testing ==
The first flight of the XA-32 prototype was not until May 22, 1943, two years after the design was proposed; and almost every aspect of performance fell short of the specifications. Devoid of weapons load, the XA-32 could only reach 279 mph (242 kn; 449 km/h) and although handling was adequate, as soon as armament and external stores were added, the performance dropped drastically and more seriously, the disturbed airflow "set up severe buffeting at its top speed." A second prototype, the XA-32A, was built with reduced armament, but it failed to resolve the issues.

By this point, the Army had abandoned plans to field the XA-32 and did not pursue further production. Changing combat priorities and lessons learned in North Africa and Italy revealed the vulnerabilities of dive bombers like the A-36 Apache when facing enemy fighters. This led to a shift toward versatile fighter-bombers like the P-47 Thunderbolt, which excelled in both ground attack and air combat roles.

After the XA-32 program was officially canceled in 1944, multiple congressional investigations into the company revealed significant management issues, and Brewster’s contract to build F3A-1 Corsairs was terminated. Brewster went out of business in 1946, becoming the only American aircraft manufacturer to fail due to World War II.

Only two examples were built, 42-13568 and 42-13569, (Note: Originally a XA-32, later converted to a XA-32A.) both of which were scrapped at the conclusion of flight testing.

== Specifications ==
Data from National Museum of the United States Air Force (Factsheets)

General characteristics

- Crew: 1 (Pilot)
- Length: 40 ft 7 in (12.37 m)
- Wingspan: 45 ft 1 in (13.74 m)
- Height: 11 ft 3 in (3.44 m)
- Wing area: 425 sq ft (39.48 m^{2})
- Empty weight: 13,500 lb (6,123 kg)
- Gross weight: 16,000 lb (7,257 kg)
- Max takeoff weight: 20,000 lb (9,072 kg)
- Fuel capacity: 200 US gal (757 L; 167 imp gal)
- Powerplant: 1 × Pratt & Whitney R-2800-37 Double Wasp radial engine, 2,100 hp (1,600 kW)
- Propellers: 4-bladed Curtiss propeller

Performance

- Maximum speed: 311 mph (501 km/h, 270 kn) at 10,000 ft (3,048 m)
- Cruise speed: 196 mph (315 km/h, 170 kn)
- Range: 960 mi (1,545 km, 830 nmi) max
- Combat range: 300–500 mi (483–805 km, 260–430 nmi)
- Service ceiling: 26,000 ft (7,900 m)
- Wing loading: 36.5 lb/sq ft (178 kg/m^{2})
- Power/mass: 0.13 hp/lb

Armament

- Guns:

- XA-32: 8 × 12.7 mm (.50 cal) Browning AN/M2 machine guns
- XA-32A: 4 × 20 mm AN/M2 autocannons

- Hardpoints: 3 (One internal fuselage bomb bay, 2 underwing racks) with a capacity of 3,000 lb (1,400 kg), with provisions to carry combinations of:
  - Bombs:
    - 1 × 1,000 lb (450 kg) bomb in bomb bay
    - 2 × 1,000 lb (450 kg) bombs underwings
  - Other: 2 × 165-gal drop tanks
