= Brewster Aeronautical Corporation =

Defunct US airplane manufacturer

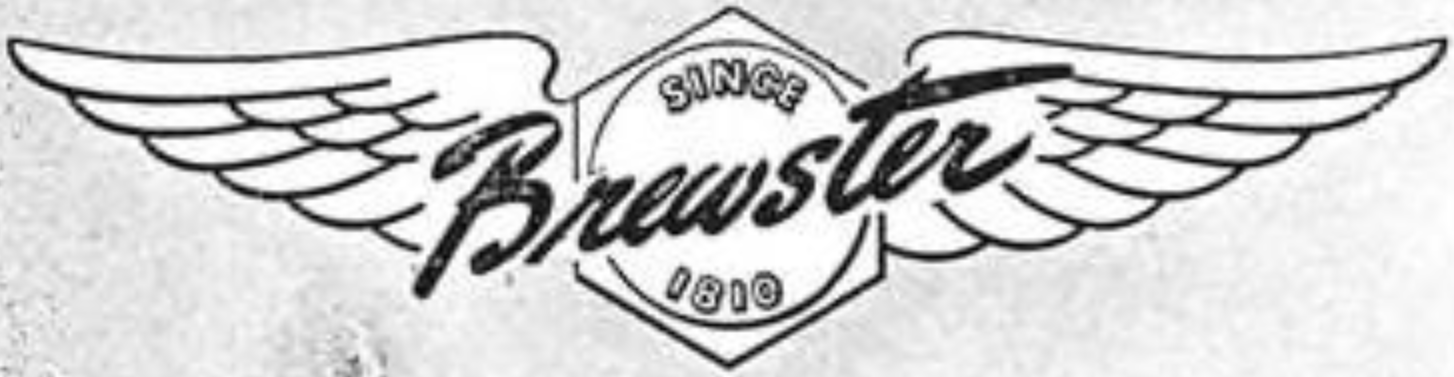

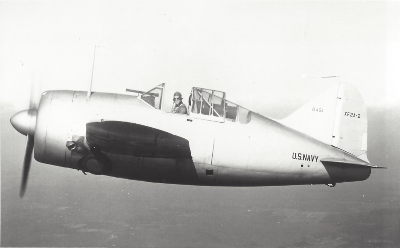
- The prototype XF2A-2 in flight
- Industry: Aerospace
- Founded: 1924
- Defunct: 1946
- Key people: Dayton Brown; James Work

The Brewster Aeronautical Corporation was an American defense contractor that was founded in 1932, with a focus on naval aircraft. Fraught with fraud, mismanagement and inefficient production, the company was eventually taken over by the United States Navy for a period, and folded at the end of World War II.

== History ==
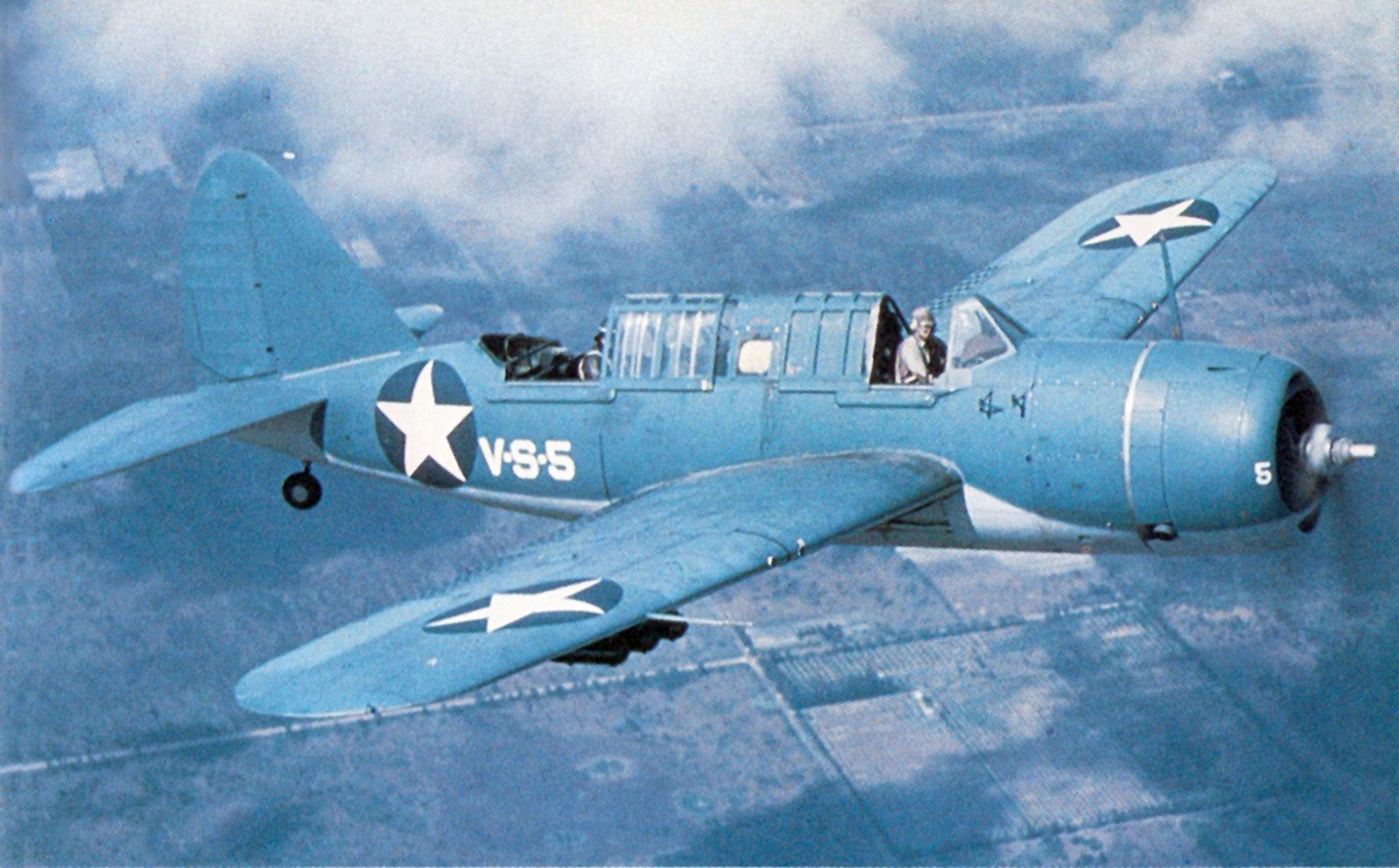
An SB2A-4 near NAS Vero Beach, Florida, 1942–43

Originally a carriage builder, Brewster & Co.'s involvement in aviation began in the aftermath of World War I, when it started manufacturing hulls for Loening amphibians. By 1928, it was building floats for the Vought O2U Corsair. In 1932, James Work, an aeronautical engineer, bought the division for US$30,000 (equivalent to $708,000 in 2025) and created the Brewster Aeronautical Corporation. Brewster started out making seaplane floats and wing panels, but with the hire of chief engineer Dayton Brown it embarked on its own designs. It operated three aircraft plants, at the Brewster Building in Long Island City, New York, Newark, New Jersey, and, in 1941, in Warminster Township, Pennsylvania, which was then known as NAS Johnsville.

Brown's first design, in 1934, was a two-seat scout-bomber, the Brewster SBA, which first flew in 1936; subsequently the Naval Aircraft Factory built them, with the designation SBN-1. The Brewster SB2A Buccaneer was a follow-on design that first flew in 1941 and was also ordered by the Royal Air Force, who named it the Bermuda.

A design in 1936 for a carrier-capable monoplane fighter resulted in the Brewster F2A (named Buffalo by the British), which was chosen over an early version of the Grumman F4F Wildcat. The F2A prototype handled well in 1938 tests, and the Navy ordered 54. However, production was slow, at least partly due to the inefficient factory in the Brewster Building. The Navy ended up ordering Wildcats, which by 1938 had been greatly improved.

Buffalos were exported to Finland starting in 1939, and more were intended for Belgium, but before deliveries could begin, Germany conquered the country. The United Kingdom also received Buffalos, which eventually ended up in the Far East. They suffered badly in combat against Japanese Zeros. The Buffalos were most popular with the Finnish Air Force, which used them successfully against the Soviet air force, and began a program to build an indigenous version named the Humu. The Dutch also purchased 92 Buffalos and assigned most to the Militaire Luchtvaart KNIL in the Dutch East Indies (now Indonesia) where they fought against the Japanese. Several captured by the Japanese were repainted with Japanese Hinomaru insignia and extensively tested.

During World War II, it became apparent that Brewster was mismanaged. The company had grown from a relatively minor aircraft parts supplier to a full-fledged defense giant in only a few years. Brewster ranked 84th among United States corporations in value of World War II military production contracts. Jimmy Work had hired Alfred and Ignacio Miranda as the company salesmen. They had been involved in frauds, spending two years in prison for selling illicit arms to Bolivia, and had over-promised Brewster production capabilities to customers.

As the war swelled the defense industries, the quality of the newly hired work force was inferior in skills and often motivation, and the work was plagued by illicit strikes; even outright sabotage was suspected. The Navy installed George Chapline as president of the company, easing out Jimmy Work, in the hopes of speeding up production. But then in early 1942 Jimmy Work regained control, just in time to be sued for $10 million (equivalent to $197 million in 2025) for financial misdeeds. On April 18, 1942, the Navy simply seized Brewster and put the former head of the Naval Aircraft Factory, George Conrad Westervelt, in charge. In mid-May, a new board of directors was appointed by the Navy, with Brewster making the F3A-1 Corsair under license.

When the Navy cancelled Brewster's last contract, for assembly of the Corsair, on July 1, 1944, the company was in serious trouble. In October, after reporting a large loss, the management decided to shut down the company, and on April 5, 1946, the Brewster Aeronautical Corporation was dissolved by its shareholders.

== Aircraft ==
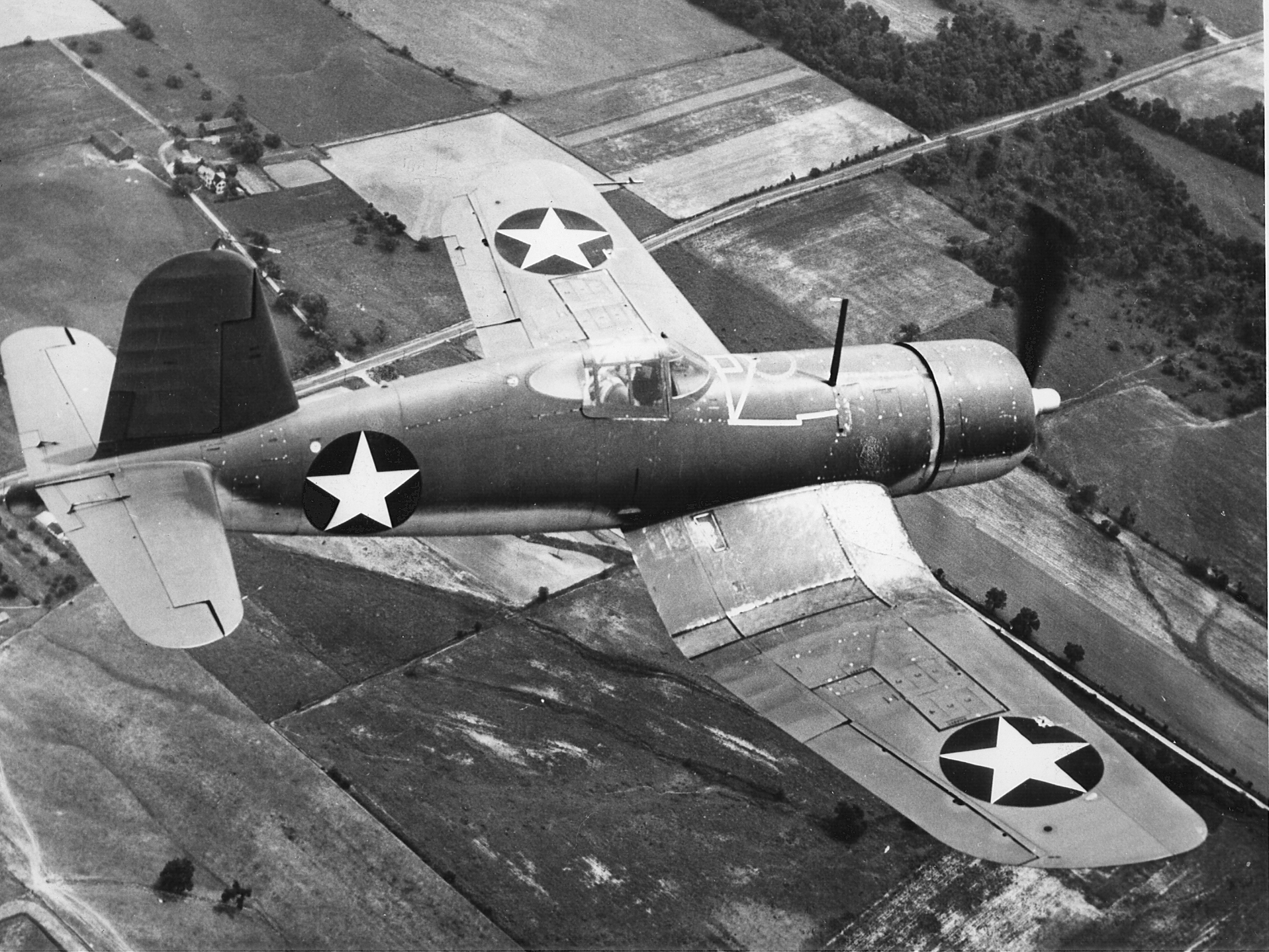
The F3A was a license built version of the Vought F4U Corsair

Model name	First flight	Number built	Type
Brewster XSBA	1936	1	Single engine monoplane scout bomber
Brewster F2A Buffalo	1937	509	Single engine monoplane naval fighter
Brewster SB2A Buccaneer	1941	771	Single engine monoplane scout bomber
Brewster F3A Corsair	1943	735	Single engine monoplane naval fighter
Brewster XA-32	1943	2	Prototype single engine monoplane ground attack aircraft
