= Jorma Karhunen =

Finnish flying ace (1913–2002)

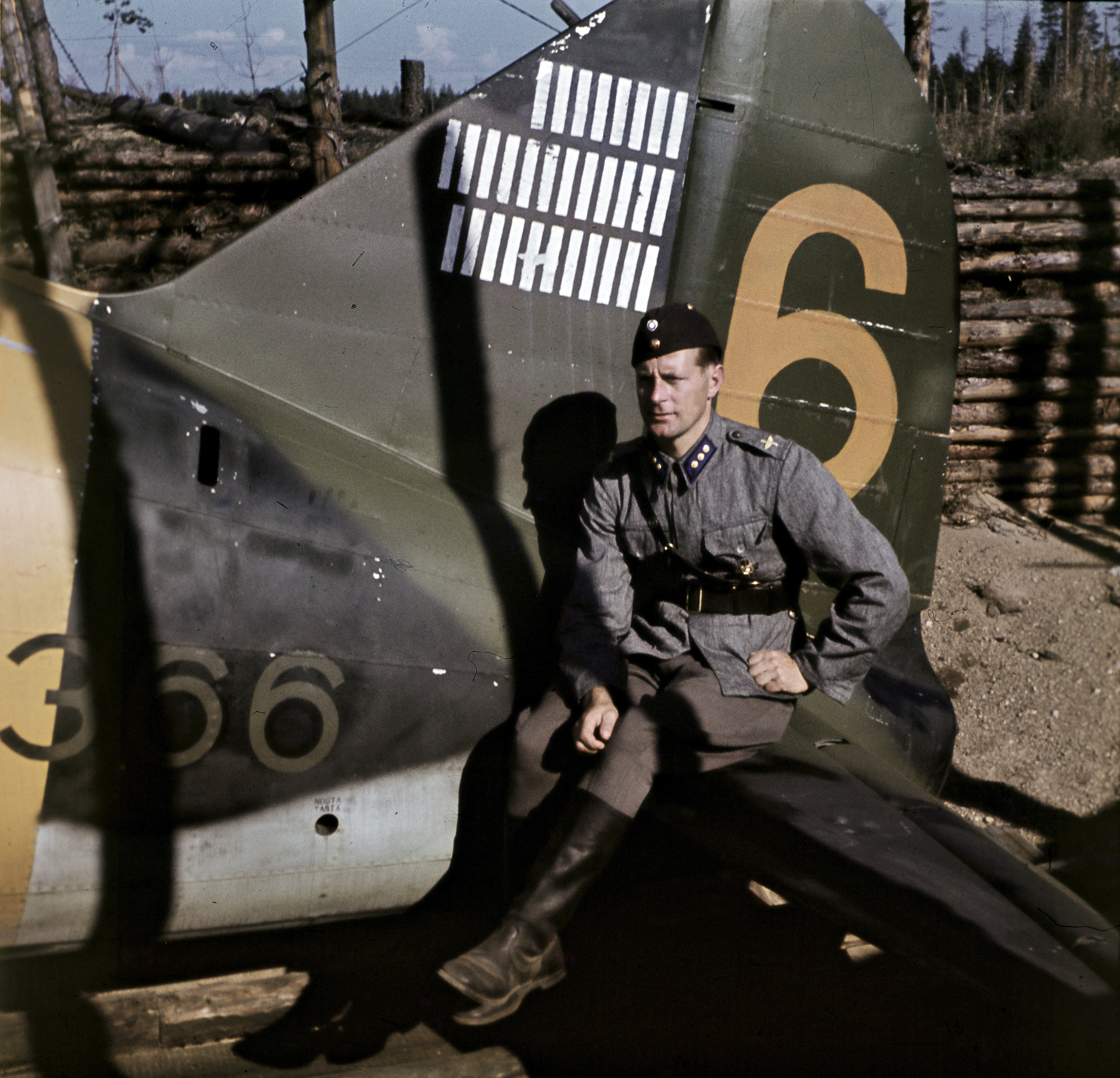
- Karhunen at Suulajärvi airfield in 26 August 1943
- Born: 17 March 1913; Pyhäjärvi Ul (Karkkila)
- Died: 18 January 2002 (aged 88); Tampere
- Military career
- Allegiance: Finland
- Branch: Finnish Air Force
- Service years: 1934–1955
- Rank: Captain
- Nickname: Joppe
- Unit: Lentolaivue 24
- Conflicts: World War II; Winter War; Continuation War

Jorma "Joppe" Karhunen (17 March 1913 – 18 January 2002) was a Finnish Air Force ace and an author.

Karhunen scored 31.5 kills in World War II; 25.5 of his air victories were achieved while flying the Brewster F2A Buffalo, an American fighter.

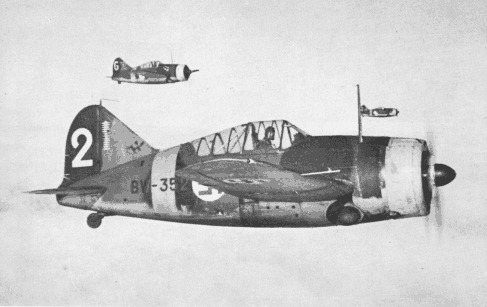
Finnish Air Force's Brewster B-239 formation during the Continuation War. Cptn Karhunen scored 25.5 - out of 35.5 - of his kills flying this type of aircraft

Soon after the outbreak of the Continuation War, on 25 June 1941, when he was 1st Lt, Karhunen led the 3rd Flight (of eight Brewster Buffalo) of Lentolaivue (LLv) 24, based at Vesivehmaa.

On 9 July, Karhunen was one of the dozen Brewster pilots led by Major Gustaf Magnusson on a patrol over Lahdenpohja, that in a ten-minute air combat shot down eight out of 15 Soviet bombers and fighters.

At the end of July, Karhunen's 3/LLv24 was ordered to support the offensive against the Karelian Ishtmus, scheduled for 31 July. His unit's opponents were 5th SAD, 7th and 153rd IAP and 65th and 235th ShaPs. On 1 August Karhunen's unit of seven Brewsters shot down six I-16s near Rautjärvi, WO Ilmari Juutilainen, claiming two of them. Eleven days later, on 12 August, Capt Karhunen was involved in the heaviest air combat over the Karelian Isthmus, while leading six Brewsters from 3/LLv 24 on a patrol. On Antrea area, they attacked a formation of about 20 aircraft from 65th ShAP. During the ensuing 30 minutes air combat, Karhunen and his pilots shot down nine Polikarpov I-153s "Chaikas".

On 26 September, Soviets suffered further losses. That day, Capt Karhunen's formation of seven Buffalos shot down six I-15s north of Petäjäselkä. The Finns came back in the area a short while later and encountered eight I-15 bis from 65th ShAP. The Brewster pilots shot down three of the enemy aircraft. Capt. Karhunen, who claimed two I-153, his fourth and fifth air victories, recalled:

While carrying out a reconnaissance mission over Mikonselkä railway station. I saw three I-153s flying beneath the clouds, southeast of Petäjäselkä. Diving after them... I singled out the fighter to the left of the formation. I shot it down in flames in the forest with just a few burst of fire. After pulling up, I saw a second I-153 at low-level flying in a southeasterly direction four kilometres south of where my first Chaika had crashed. Getting on its tail, I fired at the I-153 from a distance of 100 metres. It clipped the treetops and crashed, although on this occasion it didn't burn.

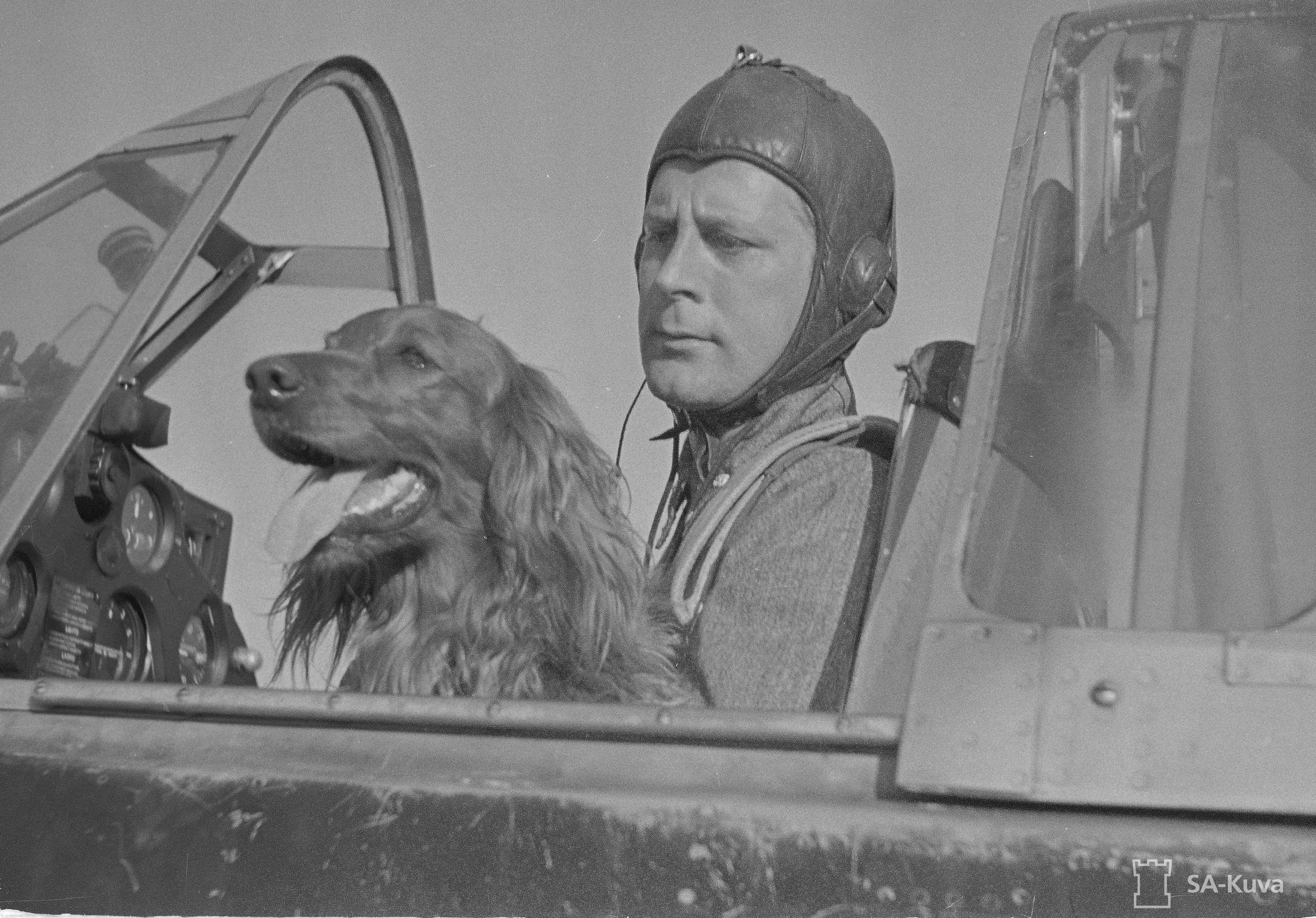
Karhunen and the mascot dog (an Irish Setter) Peggy Brown

After the end of hostilities, Karhunen, the captain and commander of the 3rd flight of LeLv 24, recalled:

The Brewster model 239 was good against the older Russian fighters, Polikarpov I-153 Chaika (Gull) and I-16. Hence the period 1941–42 was the best time for us. In 1943 it was already significantly more difficult when the Russians began to use their newer fighters against us... Later, with the Yaks, Hurricanes, Tomahawks, LaGG-3 and MiGs, it became a fight to the death.

Karhunen retired from active duty on 13 December 1955.

During his retirement years, Karhunen wrote 36 books in Finnish, mainly about aerial combat in the wars between Finland and the USSR. The books were published between 1958 and 2000. As an author, Karhunen used the alias Joppe Karhunen.

Karhunen won the Officers' Series Championship in the SA Ski Championships in 1937 and participated in the Finnish team in the Military Patrol Skiing World Championships in Zakopane in 1939. In 1992, Karhunen was awarded the Harmon statue by the Finnish Aviation Association.

== Bibliography ==
- Neulen, Hans Werner (July 1999). "Le dernier chevalier: "Joppe" Karhunen" [The Last Knight: "Joppe" Karhunen]. Avions: Toute l'Aéronautique et Son Histoire (in French) (76): 54–58. ISSN 1243-8650.
- Neulen, Hans Werner. In the Skies of Europe. Ramsbury, Marlborough, UK: The Crowood Press, 2000. ISBN 1-86126-799-1.
- Stenman, Kari and Andrew Thomas. Brewster F2A Buffalo Aces of World War 2 (Aircraft of the Aces). Oxford, UK: Osprey Publishing, 2010. ISBN 978-1-84603-481-7.
