= No. 146 Squadron RAF =

Defunct flying squadron of the Royal Air Force

- Active: 15 October 1941 – 30 June 1945
- Country: United Kingdom
- Branch: Royal Air Force
- Mottos: Percutit insidians pardus Latin: The watchful panther strikes

Insignia
- Squadron Badge: A panther head.
- Squadron Codes: YZ (Apr 1939 – Sep 1939)

No. 146 Squadron RAF was a Royal Air Force Squadron formed as a fighter unit in India in World War II.

== History ==
Plans for formation of the squadron in World War I never came to fruition. It was formed in on 15 October 1941 at Risalpur, India, then moved to Assam where it was equipped with Mohawks. Upon arrival in Calcutta it was equipped with Hurricanes and flew missions over Burma. It converted to Thunderbolts before its disbandment in June 1945.

== Aircraft operated ==
Aircraft operated by no. 146 Squadron RAF
From	To	Aircraft	Variant
Oct 1941	Sep 1942	Hawker Audax	
Mar 1942	May 1942	Curtiss Mohawk	IV
Mar 1942	May 1942	Brewster F2A Buffalo	I
May 1942	Jan 1944	Hawker Hurricane	IIB
Dec 1943	May 1944	Hawker Hurricane	IIC
Jun 1944	Mar 1945	Republic P-47 Thunderbolt	I
Mar 1945	Jul 1945	Republic P-47 Thunderbolt	II
