= Finnish Air Force Museum =

- Suomen Ilmavoimamuseo
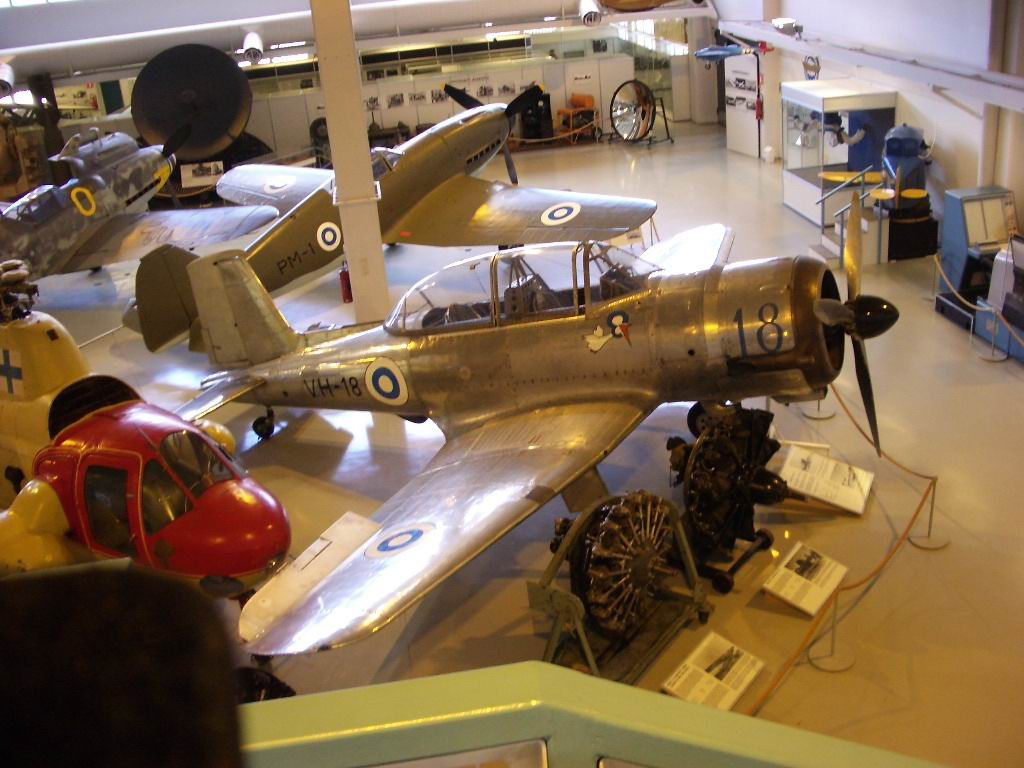
- A Valmet Vihuri II on display

- Location within Finland
- Established: 1 June 1979
- Location: Tikkakoski, Jyväskylä, Finland
- Coordinates: 62°23′14″N 025°40′55″E
- Type: Aviation museum
- Visitors: 25,000
- Director: Kai Mecklin
- Owner: Foundation of Aviation Museum of Central Finland
- Website: airforcemuseum.fi

The Finnish Air Force Museum (Finnish: Suomen Ilmavoimamuseo), formerly the Aviation Museum of Central Finland (Finnish: Keski-Suomen ilmailumuseo), is an aviation museum located near Jyväskylä Airport in Tikkakoski, Jyväskylä, Finland. The museum exhibits the aviation history of Finland, from the early 1900s until today. The museum is owned by the Foundation of Aviation Museum of Central Finland (Finnish: Keski-Suomen Ilmailumuseosäätiö).

The exhibition consists of aircraft, engines and aircrew equipment which has been used by the Finnish Air Force. The equipment of the Air Force Signals Museum has its own section. A large collection of scale models gives a wider perspective to the whole field of aviation.

The museum has around 25,000 visitors.

== Aircraft ==
The following aircraft are a selection of the collection. More aircraft are being stored elsewhere, waiting for restoration.

- Avro 504K
- Bell P-39 Airacobra
- Brewster Buffalo
- Bristol Blenheim
- De Havilland D.H.60X Moth
- De Havilland D.H. 115 Vampire Trainer T.Mk.55
- Douglas DC-3 i.e. C-47
- Focke-Wulf Fw 44 J Stieglitz
- Fokker D.XXI
- Folland Gnat Mk.1
- Fouga CM170 Magister
- Gourdou-Lesseurre B.3
- Ilyushin Il-28R
- Martinsyde F.4 Buzzard
- Bf 109G-6Y 167271 - MT-507
- Mignet HM-14 Pou du Ciel Taivaankirppu
- MiG-15 UTI (twin-seated)
- MiG-17
- MiG-21 F,Bis (single-seated)
- MiG-21 U,UM (twin-seated)
- Mil Mi-1
- Mil Mi-4
- Morane-Saulnier MS 50C
- Saab 91D Safir
- Saab 35 Draken (Single- and twin-seated)
- Thulin typ D replika
- Tiira
- Valmet Vihuri II
- VL Humu
- VL Pyörremyrsky
- VL Pyry

== See also ==
- List of aerospace museums
- List of museums in Finland

== Sources ==
- Heinonen, Timo; Kakko, Tapio (1989). Keski-Suomen ilmailumuseo, Tikkakoski (in Finnish). Tikkakoski: Keski-Suomen ilmailumuseo. ISBN 952-90-0925-9.
