= VL Humu =

Finnish World War II-era fighter aircraft

Humu
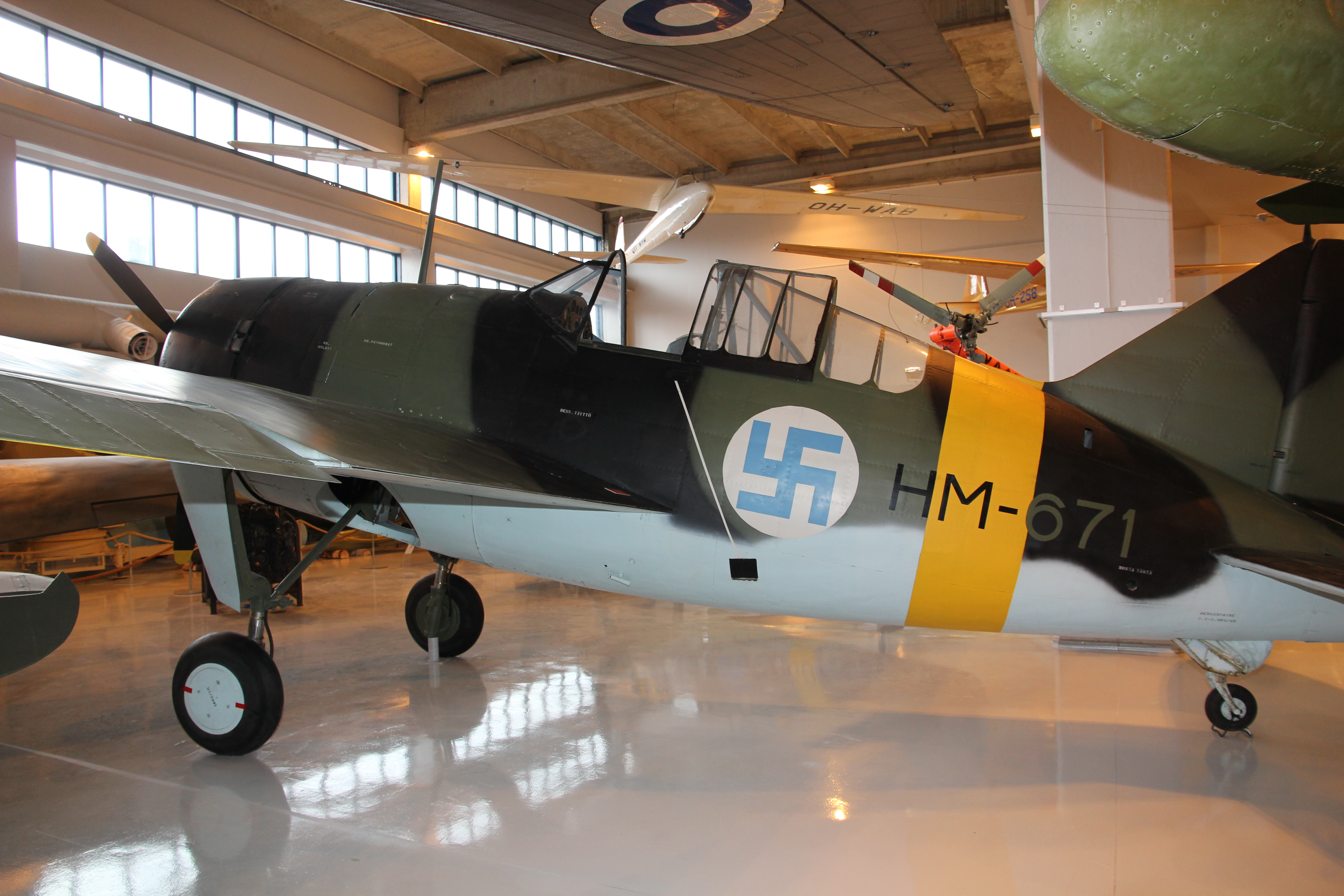
- The sole VL Humu at Central Finland Aviation museum

General information
- Type: Fighter aircraft
- National origin: Finland
- Manufacturer: VL
- Status: Cancelled
- Primary user: Finnish Air Force
- Number built: 1

History
- First flight: 8 August 1944
- Developed from: Brewster F2A Buffalo

The VL Humu (Whirlwind) is a Finnish fighter aircraft, designed by Valtion lentokonetehdas in 1944, and based on the American Brewster F2A Buffalo.

== Design and development ==
The Finnish Air Force had acquired 44 B-239 variants of the Brewster Buffalo and put them to good use during the Continuation War, so it was decided in 1942 to produce a copy due to aircraft shortages. Chief designer Martti Vainio, along with designers Torsti Verkkola, Arvo Ylinen at Valtion Lentokonetehdas were tasked with designing the new aircraft as well as a replacement wing made of wood instead of metal.

The Humu was largely constructed out of wood due to scarcity of metals, but the frame was made from steel and its design followed closely that of the Brewster. It was planned that captured Soviet engines and instrument panels would be used. It was powered by a 930 hp Shvetsov M-63 engine, previously tested on a Brewster. The wooden wing added 250 kg of extra weight and moving the fuels tanks from the wing to the aft fuselage adversely affected maneuverability due to the center of gravity being shifted.

The first flight took place on 8 August 1944. Later flight testing gave a total flight time of 19 hours and 50 minutes. The aircraft was 250 kg (551 lb) heavier than calculated, its engine was underpowered, and it was felt that the fighter would not be able to compete against enemy aircraft. The end of the Continuation War in September 1944, combined with the aircraft's poor performance, however, put the end to the project.

== Operators ==
Finland

- Finnish Air Force

== Aircraft on display ==
The sole Humu, HM-671, was placed in storage in 1945. It was restored between 1972 and 1974 and is displayed at the Central Finland Aviation museum.

== Specifications (VL Humu) ==
Data from https://www.militaryfactory.com/aircraft/detail.php?aircraft_id=1585

General characteristics

- Crew: 1
- Length: 8.03 m (26 ft 4 in)
- Wingspan: 10.67 m (35 ft 0 in)
- Height: 3.66 m (12 ft 0 in)
- Wing area: 19.4 m^{2} (209 sq ft)
- Airfoil: root: NACA 23018; tip: NACA 23009
- Empty weight: 1,950 kg (4,299 lb)
- Max takeoff weight: 2,900 kg (6,393 lb)
- Powerplant: 1 × Shvetsov M-63 9-cylinder air-cooled radial piston engine, 746 kW (1,000 hp)
- Propellers: 3-bladed variable-pitch propeller

Performance

- Maximum speed: 430 km/h (270 mph, 230 kn)
- Range: 1,250 km (780 mi, 670 nmi)
- Service ceiling: 8,000 m (26,000 ft)
- Rate of climb: 10.16 m/s (2,000 ft/min)

Armament

- Guns: 2 × 12.7 mm LKk/42 machine guns

== See also ==
Related development

- Brewster F2A Buffalo

Aircraft of comparable role, configuration, and era

- Grumman F4F Wildcat

Related lists

- List of aircraft of World War II
