= Brewster F2A Buffalo =

WWII American fighter plane

F2A Buffalo
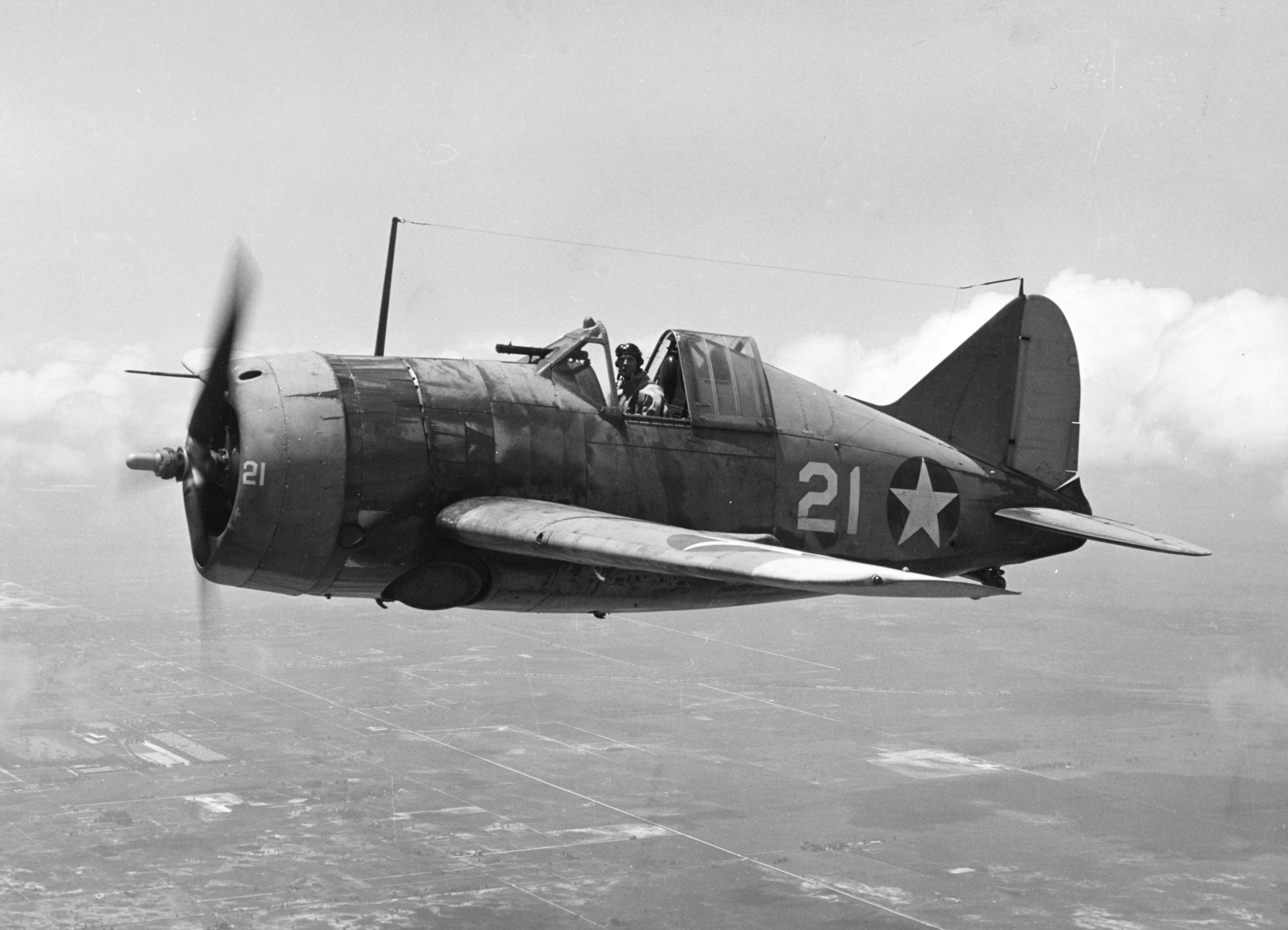

General information
- Type: Fighter aircraft
- National origin: United States
- Manufacturer: Brewster Aeronautical Corporation
- Primary users: United States Navy United States Marine Corps; Royal Air Force; Royal Netherlands East Indies Army Air Force; Finnish Air Force
- Number built: 509

History
- Manufactured: 1938–1941
- Introduction date: April 1939
- First flight: 2 December 1937
- Retired: 1948 (Finland)
- Developed into: VL Humu

The Brewster F2A Buffalo is an American fighter aircraft which saw service early in World War II. Designed and built by the Brewster Aeronautical Corporation, it was one of the first U.S. monoplanes with an arrestor hook and other modifications for aircraft carriers. The Buffalo won a competition against the Grumman F4F Wildcat in 1939 to become the U.S. Navy's first monoplane fighter aircraft. Although superior to the Grumman F3F biplane it replaced, and the early F4Fs, the Buffalo was largely obsolete when the United States entered the war, being unstable and overweight, especially when compared to the Japanese Mitsubishi A6M Zero.

Several nations, including Finland, Belgium, Britain and the Netherlands, ordered the Buffalo. The Finns were the most successful with their Buffalos, flying them in combat against early Soviet fighters with excellent results. During the Continuation War of 1941–1944, the Brewster Model 239s (export versions of the F2A-1) operated by the Finnish Air Force proved capable of engaging and destroying most types of Soviet fighter aircraft operating against Finland at that time, and claimed in the first phase of that conflict 32 Soviet aircraft shot down for every Model 239 lost, producing 36 Buffalo "aces".

In December 1941, Buffalos operated by both British Commonwealth (339E) and Dutch (339C/D) air forces in South East Asia suffered severe losses in combat against the Japanese Navy's A6M Zero and the Japanese Army's Nakajima Ki-43 "Oscar". The British attempted to lighten their Buffalos by removing ammunition and fuel and installing lighter guns to improve performance, but it made little difference. After the first few engagements, the Dutch halved the fuel and ammunition load in the wings, which allowed their Buffalos (and their Hawker Hurricanes) to stay with the Ki-43 in turns.

The Buffalo was built in three variants for the U.S. Navy: the F2A-1, F2A-2 and F2A-3. (In foreign service, usually with lower horsepower engines, these types were designated Model 239, 339, and 339-23 respectively.) The F2A-3 variant saw action with United States Marine Corps (USMC) squadrons at the Battle of Midway. Shown by the experience of Midway to be no match for the Zero, the F2A-3 was derided by USMC pilots as a "flying coffin". Indeed, the F2A-3s performance was substantially inferior to the F2A-2 variant used by the Navy before the outbreak of the war despite detail improvements.

== Name ==
The US Navy called the aircraft the Brewster F2A, or simply the F2A or Brewster (pursuit) fighter. The Brewster Aeronautical Corporation's sales force, the Brewster Export Corporation, legally a separate company, appears to have used a three-number designation for the aircraft it offered for export abroad. The second two numbers denoted the year the product was offered for sale and the first number the ordinal number of the product offered that year. E.g. Brewster Model 139 = the first aircraft design offered abroad by the Export Corporation in the year 1939. Contrary to popular belief, the 139 appears to not have been the XF2A-1, but a scout fighter design based on the 138, in turn the export version of the XSBA-1 scout bomber. Neither design ever left the drawing board. No documents from the 1930s and 1940s appear to make any use of the B-prefix applied in literature to the export models, rather it appears to be an entirely post-war anachronism. The designation 439 referring to the 339-23 is likewise a post-war fiction.

The British purchased the Model 339E based on the F2A-2 in 1940 and some time in 1940-41 named it the Buffalo Mk. I. There is some evidence that the name Buffalo in reference to the F2A spread to limited American use in the Pacific, but otherwise the name spread to mean all F2A type fighters only in the decades following World War II. The Finns and the Dutch exclusively called their 239s and 339Cs, Ds and -23s respectively Brewsters, never Buffalos.

== Design and development ==
=== United States Navy ===
In 1935, the U.S. Navy issued a requirement for a carrier-based fighter intended to replace the Grumman F3F. The Brewster XF2A-1 monoplane, designed by a team led by Dayton T. Brown, was one of two aircraft designs that were initially considered. The XF4F-1 had a double-row radial engine but was a biplane like the F3F. The U.S. Navy competition was re-opened to allow another competitor, the NF-1, a navalized Seversky P-35, but it was eliminated because the prototype could not exceed 267 mph (430 km/h). The XF2A-1 first flew on 2 December 1937 and early test results showed it was far in advance of the Grumman biplane entry. While the XF4F-1 did not enter production, it later re-emerged as a monoplane, the Wildcat.

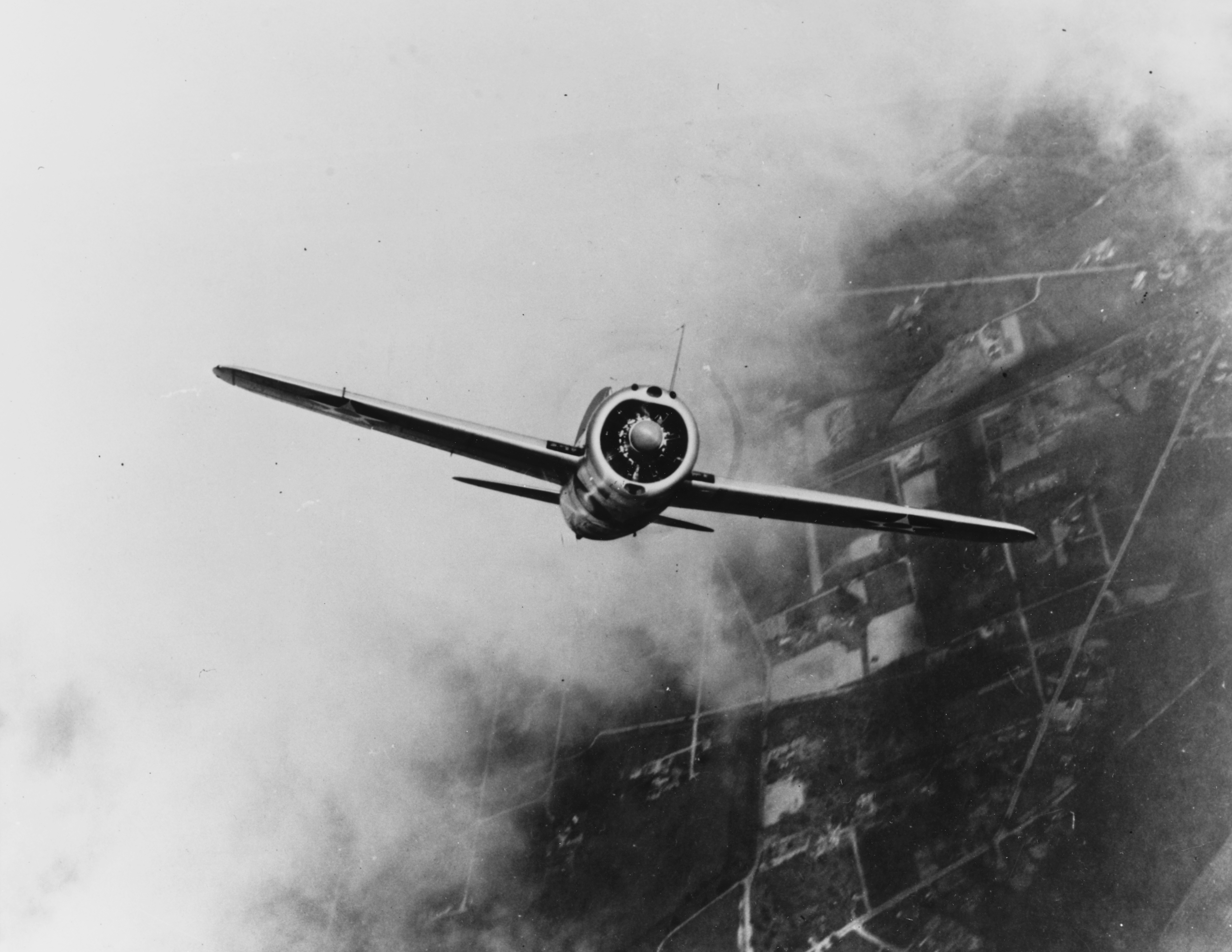
Brewster XF2A-1 prototype

The Buffalo was manufactured at the Brewster Building in Long Island City, New York. The new Brewster fighter had a modern look with a stubby fuselage, mid-set monoplane wings and a host of advanced features. It was all-metal, with flush-riveted, stressed aluminum construction, although control surfaces were still fabric-covered. The XF2A-1 also featured split flaps, a hydraulically operated retractable main undercarriage (and partially retractable tailwheel), and a streamlined framed canopy. As was common at this time, the aircraft lacked self-sealing fuel tanks and pilot armor. Fuel capacity was only 160 US gal (610 L; 130 imp gal), stored in the fuselage. Powered by a 950 hp (710 kW) single-row Wright R-1820-22 Cyclone radial engine, it had a good initial climb rate of 2,750 ft/min (840 m/min) and a top speed of 277.5 mph (446.6 km/h). The aircraft was then tested in 1938 in the Langley Research Center full-scale wind tunnel, where it was determined that certain factors were contributing to parasitic drag. Based on the tests, improvements were made to the cowling streamlining and carburetor and oil cooler intakes, and the Buffalo's speed rose to 304 mph (489 km/h) at 16,000 ft (4,900 m) without any increase in power. Other manufacturers took notice of this 10 percent increase in speed and efficiency, and wind tunnel tests became standard procedure in the US. With only a single-stage supercharger, high-altitude performance fell off rapidly. Fuselage armament was one fixed .50 in (12.7 mm) M2 Browning machine gun with 200 rounds and one fixed .30 in (7.62 mm) AN Browning machine gun with 600 rounds, both in the nose. (Note: The guns were mounted well aft, just ahead of the cockpit.) The Navy awarded Brewster Aeronautical Corporation a production contract for 54 aircraft, the F2A-1s.

Service testing of the XF2A-1 prototype began in January 1938 and in June, production started on the F2A-1. They were powered by 940 hp (700 kW) Wright R-1820-34 engines and had larger fins. The added weight of two additional .50 in (12.7 mm) Browning wing guns and other equipment specified by the Navy for combat operations reduced the initial rate of climb to 2,600 ft/min (790 m/min). Plagued by production difficulties, Brewster delivered only 11 F2A-1 aircraft to the Navy; the remainder of the order was later diverted to the Finnish Air Force in modified form under the export designation Model 239.

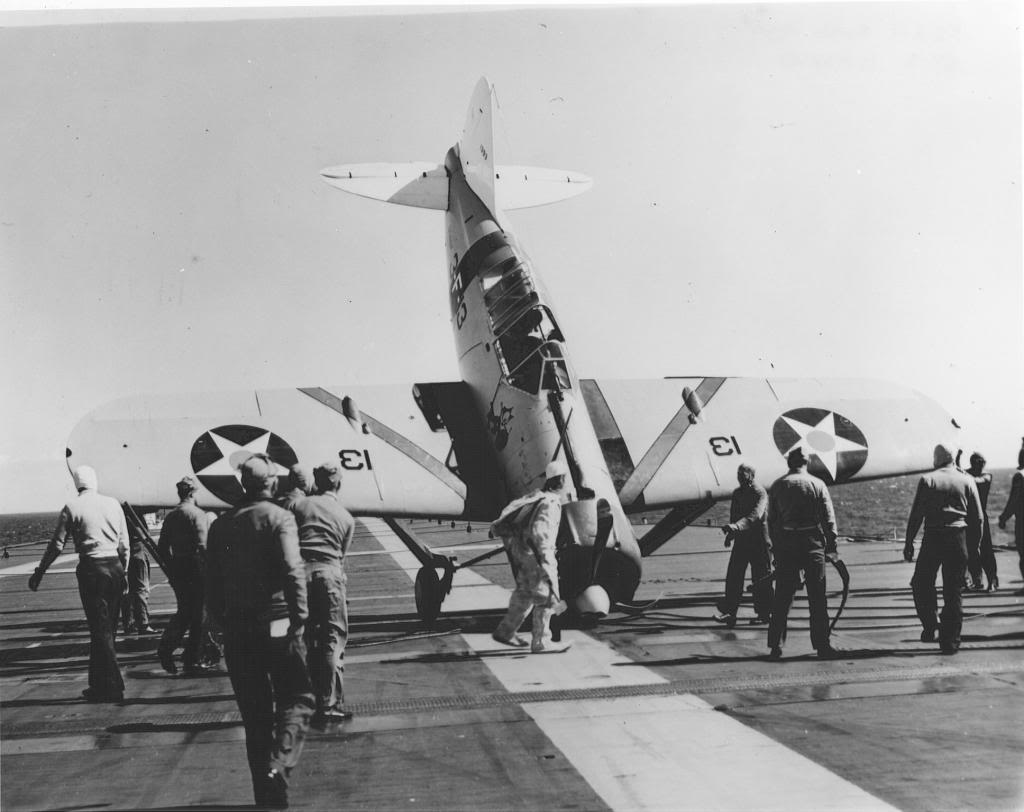
LT John S. Thach tipped this F2A-1 onto its nose on Saratoga, March 1940

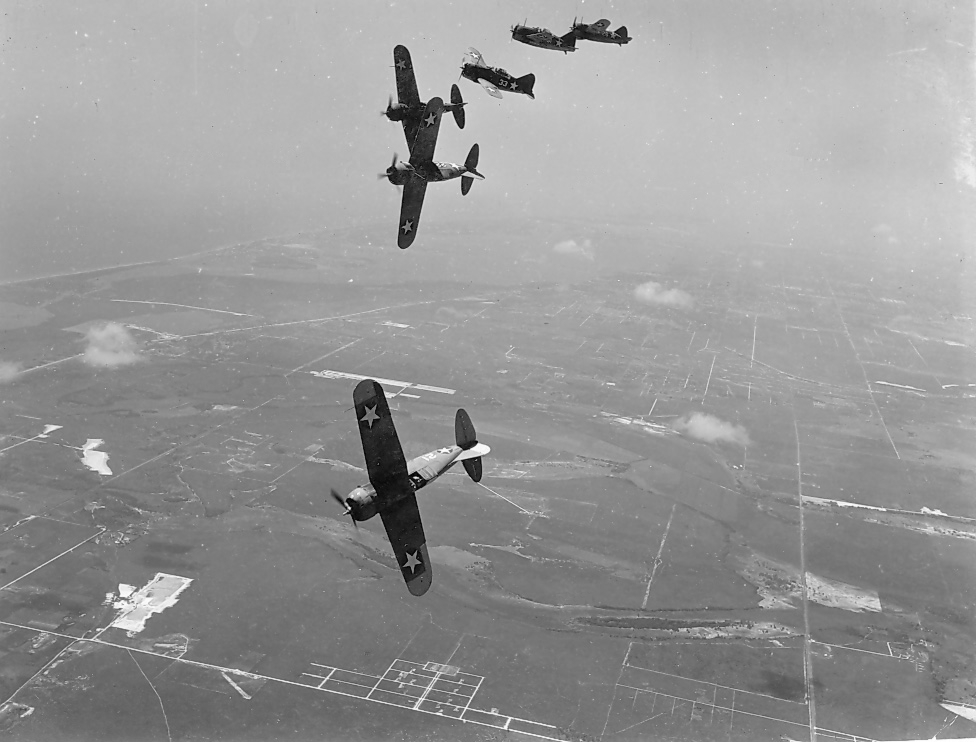
F2A-3s serving as U.S. Navy training aircraft at NAS Miami, 1942–1943

A later variant, the F2A-2, of which 43 were ordered by the U.S. Navy, included a more powerful R-1820-40 engine, a better propeller, and integral flotation gear, while still lacking pilot armor and self-sealing tanks. The increase in engine power was welcomed, but to some extent offset by the increased loaded weight (5,942 lb (2,695 kg)) of the aircraft; while top speed was increased to a respectable 323 mph (520 km/h) at 16,500 ft (5,000 m), initial climb rates dropped to 2,500 ft/min (760 m/min). Both the F2A-1 and the F2A-2 variants of the Brewster were liked by early Navy and Marine pilots, including Pappy Boyington, who praised the good turning and maneuvering abilities of the aircraft: "the early models, before they weighed it all down with armor plate, radios, and other [equipment] ... were pretty sweet little ships. Not real fast, but the [early F2As] ... could turn and roll in a phone booth". This might reasonably have been expected with the low wing loading in earlier variants, which was comparable with the Mitsubishi A6M Zero's lb/sq ft.

The F2A-3 was the last version of the Buffalo to enter service with the U.S. Navy and Marine Corps. A total of 108 examples were ordered in January 1941. By this time, the Navy had become disenchanted with the Buffalo, and had become especially annoyed at Brewster Aeronautical Corporation's frequent production delays and its frequent management difficulties. This order was seen more as a way of keeping Brewster's production lines running; they would eventually build Corsair fighters for the Navy as well as Buccaneer/Bermuda dive bombers.

The F2A-3s were conceived as long range reconnaissance fighters with new wet wings with self-sealing features and larger fuselage tanks which provided increased fuel capacity and protection, but this also increased the aircraft weight by more than 500 lb (230 kg). The wing and enlarged fuselage tank carried an additional 80 U.S. gal (300 L) of fuel; at 6 lb/U.S. gal (0.72 kg/L), the fuel alone weighed nearly 500 lb (230 kg). The addition of armor plating for the pilot and increased ammunition capacity further increased the aircraft's weight, resulting in a reduced top speed and rate of climb, while substantially degrading the Brewster's turning and maneuvering capability. The Navy found that the added weight of the F2A-3 also aggravated the problem of landing gear failure during carrier landings. However, the −40 two-speed supercharged Cyclone engine in the F2A-3 was an excellent "cruising" engine, and as such the F2A-3 had some value and saw initial service on the carriers Saratoga and Lexington.

Even in late 1940 it was apparent that the Buffalo was rapidly becoming obsolete. (Note: By the fall of 1940 the Navy had witnessed the Chance-Vought XF4U-1 prototype (later to become the F4U Corsair) exceed 400 mph (640 km/h) in level flight with its huge Twin Wasp engine.) It badly needed a more powerful engine and an enlarged wing (to offset the increased weight), but the limits of the airframe had been reached, making installation of a larger engine impossible. Soon after deliveries of the F2A-3 began, the Navy decided to eliminate the type altogether. However, a project was begun to replace the wing-mounted .50 M2 machine guns with two M2 20mm cannons. At least eight sets of wings were completed, and at least one F2A-3 was fitted with them. By then considered a second line aircraft, some were transferred to the U.S. Marine Corps, which deployed two F2A-3 squadrons to the Pacific, one at Palmyra Atoll, and another at Midway Island. Those which still remained on board aircraft carriers narrowly missed a combat opportunity when a relief mission was dispatched to Wake Island, but the relief force was withdrawn before completing the mission. Shortly thereafter, F2A-3s still in naval service were transferred to training squadrons for use as advanced trainers.

== Operational history ==
The first unit to be equipped with the F2A-1 was Lt. Cdr. Warren Harvey's VF-3, assigned to USS Saratoga air group. On 8 December 1939, VF-3 received 10 of the 11 Buffalos delivered to the U.S. Navy. The remaining 43 F2A-1s were declared surplus (to be replaced with an equal number of the improved F2A-2s) and sold to Finland. Ralph Ingersoll wrote in late 1940 after visiting Britain that the Buffalo and other American aircraft "cannot compete with either the existing British or German fighters", so Britain used them "either as advanced trainers --or for fighting equally obsolete Italian planes in the Middle East. That is all they are good for". Even the Eagle Squadrons' American pilots used Hawker Hurricanes instead of the Buffalo. Early in the war all modern monoplane fighter types were in high demand, however. Consequently, the United Kingdom, Belgium, and the Netherlands East Indies purchased several hundred export models.

=== Finland ===
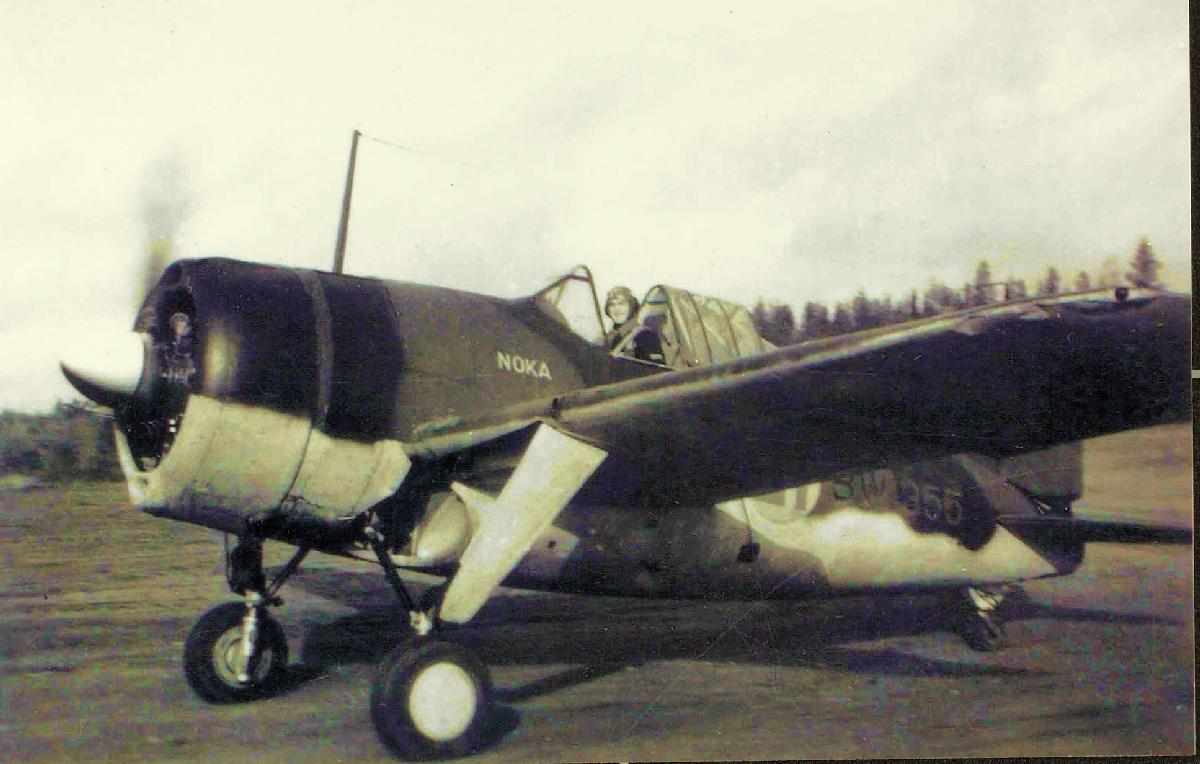
Finnish company Nokia donated sufficient funds for the FAF to purchase a 239. In return, NOKA was inscribed on BW-355. Operated by No. 24 Squadron, it was destroyed on 24 October 1944. Future ace Paavo Mellin shot down an I-16 and shared in the destruction of a MiG-3 whilst flying this aircraft.

In April 1939, the Finnish government contacted the Roosevelt administration, requesting the supply of modern combat aircraft as quickly as possible. On 17 October, the Finnish Embassy in Washington, D.C., received a telegram clearing the purchase of fighter aircraft. The only strict requirements laid down by Finnish authorities were that the aircraft be already operational and able to use 87-octane fuel. Part of an F2A-1 shipment – 44 aircraft originally intended for the US Navy – was diverted to Finland, (Note: 11 F2A-1s had been delivered to the US Navy; 44 would go to the Finnish Air Force before orders for more were cancelled at the end of the Winter War.) by the US State Department, after the USN agreed to instead accept a later shipment of F2A-2 variants.

On 16 December, the Finnish government signed a contract to purchase 44 aircraft: an F2A-1 variant designated Model 239 by Brewster. Unlike other fighters already in service, the F2A-1 and 239 lacked self-sealing fuel tanks and cockpit armor. However, the 239 was built with a more powerful engine than the F2A-1, in the form of the Wright R-1820-G5, producing 950 hp (710 kW), and the capacity to carry four machine guns (rather than the two carried by the F2A-1). The 239 was also "de-navalized" before shipment: equipment such as tailhooks and life raft containers were removed. The upgraded engine and slightly reduced net weight (i.e. from the omitted armor and de-navalization) resulted in an improved power-to-weight ratio and better general performance.

In four batches the 239 was shipped initially to Bergen, in Norway, in January and February 1940 from New York City. The crated fighters were then sent by railway to Sweden and assembled by SAAB at Trollhättan, northeast of Gothenburg.

After delivery of the 239, the Finnish Air Force added armored backrests, metric flight instruments, the Väisälä T.h.m.40 gunsight, and four .50 in (12.7 mm) machine guns. The top speed of the Finnish 239s, as modified, was 297 mph (478 km/h) at 15,675 ft (4,778 m), and their loaded weight was 5,820 lb (2,640 kg).

In February 1940, pilot Lieutenant Jorma "Joppe" Karhunen flight-tested the first 239 to become operational in Finland. Unfamiliar with the aircraft, he burned out the engine while flying very low at high speed; crashing on a snow-covered field, damaging the propeller and some belly panels. Initially unimpressed, the Finns later witnessed a demonstration by a Brewster test pilot, who was able to stay on the tail of a Finnish Fiat G.50 Freccia (Note: Contemporary of the Buffalo and renowned for its handling) fighter from Italy; although the Fiat fighter was faster in level flight, (Note: The Fiat G.50 had an all-out maximum speed of 301 mph (484 km/h) in level flight.) the Brewster could out-turn it.

None of the 239 fighters saw combat in the Winter War (1939–1940). However, five of the six delivered during the war became combat-ready before it ended.

The 239 was never referred to by the name Buffalo in Finland; it was known simply as the Brewster, or by the nicknames Taivaan helmi ("sky pearl") or Pohjoisten taivaiden helmi ("pearl of the northern skies"). Other nicknames were Pylly-Valtteri (lit. "butt-walter"), Amerikanrauta ("American hardware" or "American car") and Lentävä kaljapullo ("flying beer-bottle"). The total of 44 examples of the 239 fighters used by the FAF received serial numbers BW-351 to BW-394.

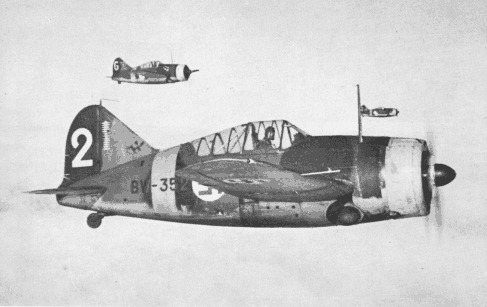
Finnish Air Force Brewster 239 formation during the Continuation War

Finnish pilots regarded the 239 as being easy to fly, or in the words of ace Ilmari Juutilainen, a "gentlemen's travelling [or touring] plane". The Buffalo was also popular within the FAF because of its relatively long range and good maintenance record. This was in part due to the efforts of the Finnish mechanics, who solved a problem that plagued the Wright Cyclone engine by inverting one of the piston rings in each cylinder, which had a positive effect on reliability. The cooler weather of Finland also helped, because the engine was prone to overheating as noted in tropical Pacific use. The Brewster Buffalo earned a reputation in Finnish Air Force service as one of its more successful fighter aircraft, along with the Fiat G.50, which scored an unprecedented kill-loss ratio of 33-1.

In service from 1941 to 1945, Buffalos of Lentolaivue 24 (Fighter Squadron 24) claimed 477 Soviet Air Force warplanes destroyed, with the combat loss of just 19 Buffalos, an outstanding victory ratio of 26:1.

During the Continuation War, Lentolaivue 24 (Fighter Squadron 24) was equipped with the 239s until May 1944, when the Buffalos were transferred to Hävittäjälentolaivue 26 (Fighter Squadron 26). Most of the pilots of Lentolaivue 24 were Winter War combat veterans. This squadron claimed a total of 459 Soviet aircraft with 239s, while losing 15 Buffalos in combat.

The Brewsters had their baptism by fire in Finland on 25 June 1941, when a pair of Buffalos from 2/LLv24, operating from Selänpää airfield (ICAO:EFSE) intercepted 27 Soviet Tupolev SBs from 201st SBAP (Note: High speed bomber air regiment) near Heinola. Five SBs were claimed as downed. Subsequent attacks were repelled by LLv24 pilots who, by dusk, had flown 77 sorties.

Many Finnish pilots racked up enormous scores by using basic tactics against Soviet aircraft. The default tactic was the four-plane "parvi" (swarm), with a pair flying lower as bait, and a higher pair to dive on enemy interceptors. The Soviet Air Force was never able to counter this tactic. The top-scoring 239 pilot was Hans Wind, with 39 kills. Lt Hans Wind, with six other Buffalos of LeLv 24, intercepted some 60 Soviet aircraft near Kronstadt. Two Soviet Pe-2 bombers, one Soviet Hawker Hurricane fighter, and 12 I-16s were claimed for the loss of just one 239 (BW-378). After evaluation of claims against actual Soviet losses, aircraft BW-364 was found to have been used to achieve 42½ kills in total by all pilots operating it, possibly making it the highest-scoring fighter airframe in the history of air warfare. The top scoring Finnish ace, Ilmari Juutilainen, scored 34 of his 94½ kills in 239s, including 28 in BW-364.

During the Continuation War, a lack of replacements led the Finns to develop a copy of the Buffalo built from non-strategic materials such as plywood, however the Humu, as they called it, was already obsolete and only a single prototype was built. By late 1943, the lack of spares, wear-and-tear, and better Soviet fighters and training greatly reduced the effectiveness of Finnish 239s, though LeLv 26 pilots would still claim some 35 victories against Soviet aircraft in mid-1944. The last victory by a Buffalo against Soviet aircraft was claimed over the Karelian Isthmus on 17 June 1944.

From 1943, Finland's air force received Messerschmitt Bf 109Gs from Germany, and this much-superior fighter re-equipped most Finnish Air Force fighter squadrons.

After Finland signed an armistice with the Soviet Union in September, 1944, they had to drive Finland's former ally, Nazi Germany out of the country during the "Lapland War". The only clash with the Luftwaffe took place on 3 October 1944 when HLeLV 26 intercepted Junkers Ju 87s, claiming two, the last victories to be made by Brewster pilots in World War II. By the end of the war in Lapland, only eight 239s were left.

Five 239s continued to fly until 1948, with last flights of Brewsters by the Finnish Air Force on 14 September 1948, when they were stored until scrapped in 1953.

=== Belgium ===
Just before the start of the war, Belgium sought more modern aircraft to expand and modernize its air force. Belgium ordered 40 Brewster 339 aircraft, a de-navalized F2A-2, fitted with the Wright R-1820-G-105 engine approved for export use. The G-105 engine had a power output of 1,000 hp (745.7 kW) (peak) on takeoff, some 200 hp (150 kW) less than the engine fitted to the U.S. Navy F2A-2. The arrestor hook and liferaft container were removed, and the aircraft was modified with a slightly longer tail.

Only one aircraft (Note: Some sources claim two aircraft.) reached France by the time Germany launched its Blitzkrieg in the West on 10 May 1940. The Buffalo was later captured intact by the Germans, and it was partially rediscovered near Darmstadt in 1945.

Six more Belgian Brewsters were offloaded at the French Caribbean island of Martinique and languished on a coastal hillside, never to be flown. The rest of the order went to the RAF.

=== British Commonwealth (Malaya) ===
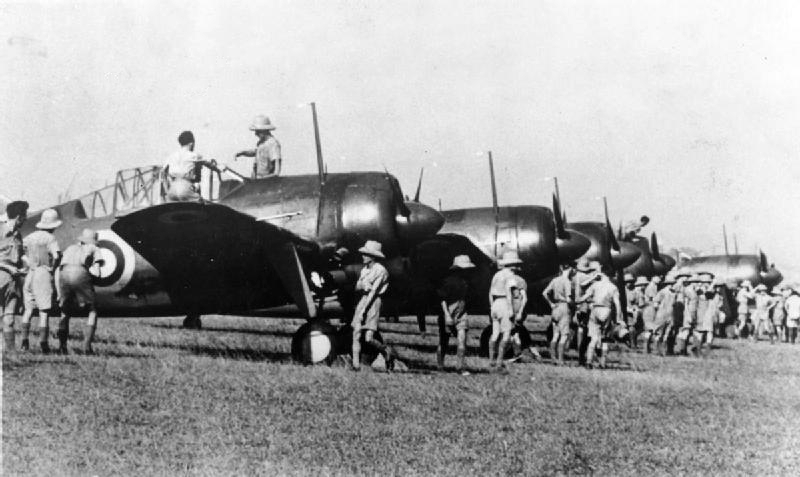
Brewster Buffalo Mk Is being inspected by RAF personnel at RAF Sembawang, Singapore in April 1941.

Facing a shortage of combat aircraft in January 1940, the British Purchasing Commission was established to acquire U.S. aircraft that would help supplement domestic production. Among the U.S. fighter aircraft that caught the Commission's attention was the Brewster. The remaining 32 339 aircraft ordered by the Belgians, suspended at the fall of France, were passed on to the United Kingdom. Appraisal by Royal Air Force acceptance personnel criticized it on numerous points including inadequate armament and lack of pilot armor, poor high-altitude performance, engine overheating, maintenance issues, and cockpit controls, while it was praised for its handling, roomy cockpit, and visibility. With a top speed of about 323 mph (520 km/h) at 21,000 ft (6,400 m), but with fuel starvation issues over 15,000 ft (4,600 m), it was considered unfit for duty in western Europe. Still desperately in need of fighter aircraft in the Pacific and Asia for British and Commonwealth air forces, the UK ordered an additional 170 aircraft under the type specification 339E.

Delivery and assembly of the Buffalos in Singapore took place in the spring of 1941. The first Buffalo units (Nos 67 and 243 Squadron RAF) were formed at RAF Kallang in March 1941.

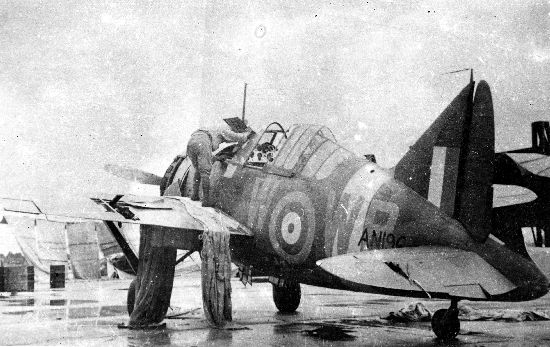
Brewster 339E (AN196/WP-W) of No. 243 Squadron RAF. This aircraft was flown by Flying Officer Maurice Holder, who flew the first Buffalo sortie in the Malayan Campaign on 8 December 1941, strafing landing barges on the Kelantan River. Damaged by ground fire, it was abandoned at RAF Kota Bharu before its fall to the Japanese.

The 339E, or Brewster Buffalo Mk I as it was designated in British service, was initially intended to be fitted with an export-approved Wright R-1820-G-105 Cyclone engine with a 1,000 hp (745.7 kW) (peak takeoff) power. (Note: Some sources quote this engine as producing 1,100 hp (820.3 kW) peak takeoff power; there may also have been alternate use of the Wright GR-1820-G102A, which was also rated for 1,100 hp (820.3 kW) engine.) The Brewster aircraft delivered to British and Commonwealth air forces were significantly altered from the 339 type sold to the Belgium and French forces in accordance with their purchase order. The Brewster factory removed the Navy life raft container and arrestor hook, while adding many new items of equipment, including a British Mk III reflector gun sight, a gun camera, a larger fixed pneumatic tire tail wheel, fire extinguisher, engine shutters, a larger battery, and reinforced armor plating and armored glass behind the canopy windshield.

The Brewster Model 339E, as modified and supplied to Great Britain was distinctly inferior in performance to the F2A-2 (Model 339) from the original order. It had a less powerful (1,000 hp (745.7 kW)) engine compared to the F2A-2's 1,200 hp (890 kW) Cyclone, yet was substantially heavier due to all of the additional modifications by some 900 lb (410 kg). The semi-retractable tail wheel had been exchanged for a larger fixed model, which was also less aerodynamic. Top speed was reduced from 323 to 313 mph (520 to 504 km/h) at combat altitudes.

In its original form, the 339 had a theoretical maximum speed of 323 mph (520 km/h) at a rather unrealistic 21,000 ft (6,400 m), but fuel starvation problems and poor supercharger performance at higher altitudes meant that this figure was never achieved in combat; the 339E was no different in this regard. Its maneuverability was severely impaired (the aircraft was unable to perform loops), and initial rate of climb was reduced to 2,300 ft/min (700 m/min). The Wright Cyclone 1890-G-105 engine designated for use in the Buffalo Mk I was in short supply; many aircraft were fitted with secondhand Wright engines sourced from Douglas DC-3 airliners and rebuilt to G105 or G102A specifications by Wright. In service, some effort was made by at least one Brewster squadron to improve the type's sluggish performance; a few aircraft were lightened by some 1,000 lb (450 kg) by removing armor plate, armored windshields, radios, gun camera, and all other unnecessary equipment, and by replacing the .50 in (12.7 mm) machine guns with .303 in (7.7 mm) machine guns. The fuselage tanks were filled with a minimum of fuel, and run on high-octane aviation petrol where available. At Alor Star airfield in Malaya, the Japanese captured over 1,000 barrels (160 m^{3}) of high-octane aviation petrol from British forces, which they promptly used in their own fighter aircraft.

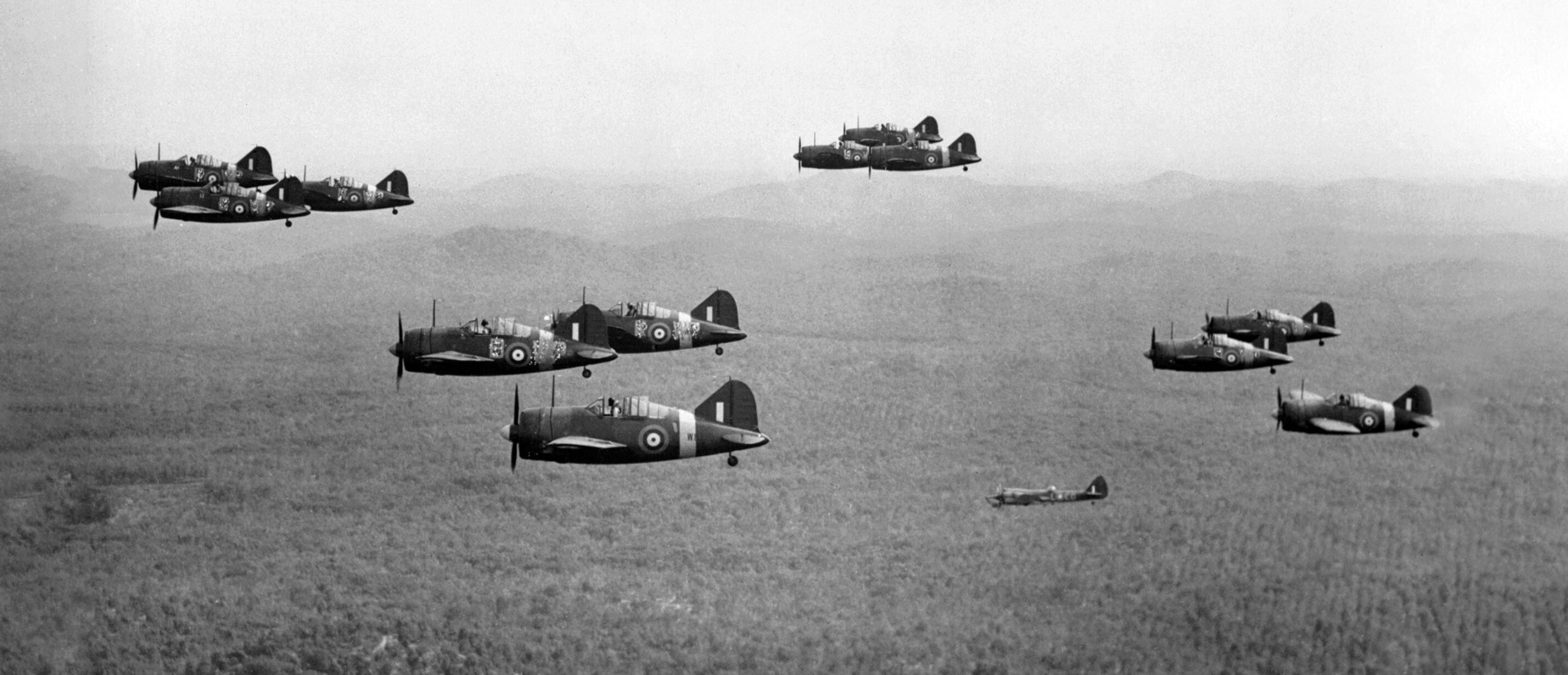
Buffalo Mk I formation over Malaya, late 1941.

Many of the pilots assigned the Buffalo lacked adequate training and experience in the type. A total of 20 of the original 169 Buffalos were lost in training accidents during 1941. By December 1941, approximately 150 Buffalo 339E aircraft made up the bulk of the British fighter defenses of Burma, Malaya and Singapore. The two RAAF, two RAF, and one RNZAF squadrons, during December 1941 – January 1942, were beset with numerous problems, including poorly built and ill-equipped aircraft. Aviation historian Dan Ford characterized it as, "The performance... was pathetic." Inadequate spare parts and support staff, airfields that were difficult to defend against air attack, lack of a clear and coherent command structure, a Japanese spy in the Army air liaison staff, antagonism between RAF and RAAF squadrons and personnel, and inexperienced pilots lacking appropriate training would lead to disaster. Although the Mk I had .50-inch guns, many aircraft were equipped with .303 Browning mounts and electric firing solenoids, which tended to fail in service. Moreover, according to Flight Lieutenant Mowbray Garden of 243 Squadron RAF, the Buffalos were supplied with only armour-piercing ammunition and no incendiary; Japanese aircraft lacked armor and self-sealing fuel tanks in the early years of the war, a fact unknown to the Allies at the time.

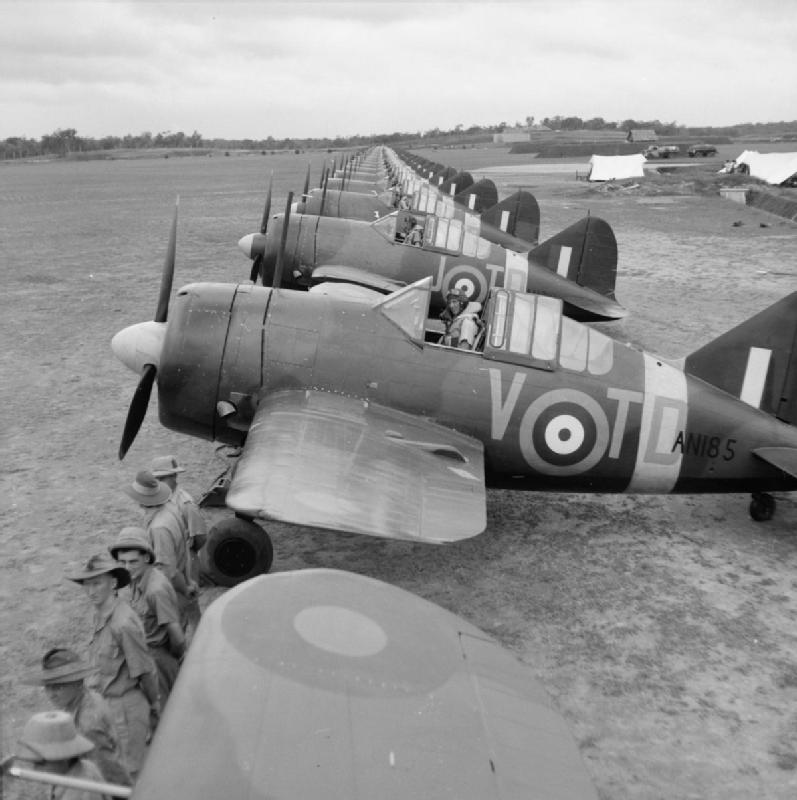
Buffalos of No. 453 Squadron RAAF lined up at RAF Sembawang in November 1941. Buffalo AN185/TD-V was flown by Flt Lt Doug Vanderfield, who shot down three Japanese bombers (two Ki-48s and one Ki-51) over Butterworth, Penang on 13 December 1941, while his undercarriage was still down.

When the Japanese invaded northern Malaya on 8 December 1941, the 339E initially performed adequately. Against the Nakajima Ki-27 "Nate", the overloaded Brewsters could at least hold their own if given time to get to altitude, and at first achieved a respectable number of kills. However, the appearance of ever greater numbers of Japanese fighters, including markedly superior types such as the Nakajima Ki-43 "Oscar" soon overwhelmed the Buffalo pilots, both in the air and on the ground. Another significant factor was the Brewster engine's tendency to overheat in the tropical climate, which caused oil to spray over the windscreen, usually forcing an aborted mission and greatly complicating attempts to intercept and destroy enemy aircraft. In the end, more than 60 Buffalo Mk I (339E) aircraft were shot down in combat, 40 destroyed on the ground, and approximately 20 more destroyed in accidents. Only about 20 Buffalos survived to reach India or the Dutch East Indies. The last airworthy Buffalo in Singapore flew out on 10 February, five days before the island fell.

It is not entirely clear how many Japanese aircraft the Buffalo squadrons shot down, although RAAF pilots alone managed to shoot down at least 20. Eighty were claimed in total, a ratio of kills to losses of just 1.3 to 1. Additionally, most of the Japanese aircraft shot down by the Buffalos were bombers. The Hawker Hurricane, which fought in Singapore alongside the Buffalo from 20 January, also suffered severe losses from ground attack; most were destroyed. The Fleet Air Arm also used the Buffalo in the Mediterranean in the Battle of Crete in early 1941.

The Brewster Mark I produced four Commonwealth aces: Geoff Fisken, Maurice Holder, A. W. B. (Alf) Clare and R. D. (Doug) Vanderfield. New Zealander Fisken, the top-scoring pilot, later flew RNZAF P-40s and became the highest-scoring Commonwealth pilot within the Pacific theatre.

==== Japanese invasion of Burma ====
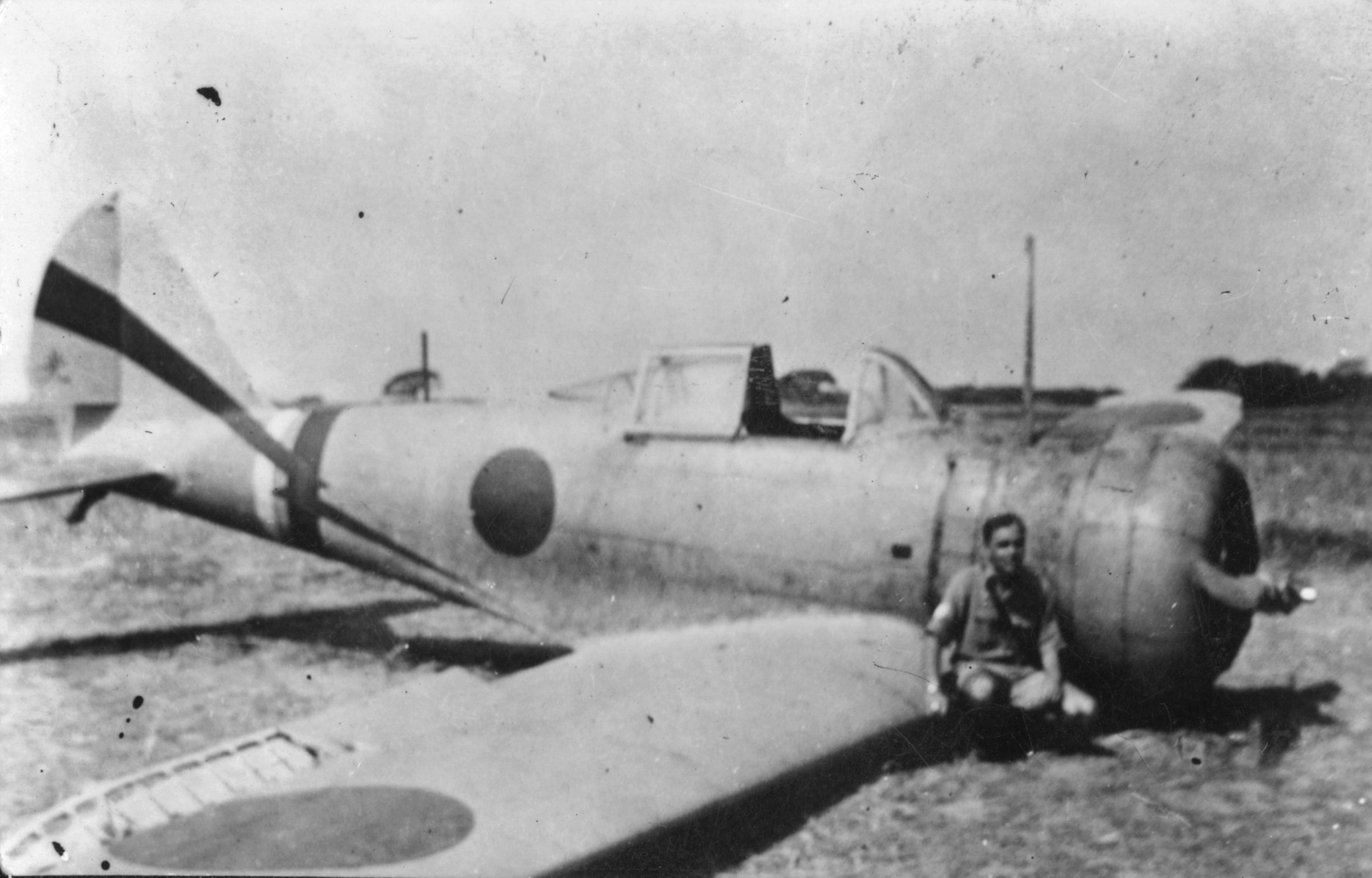
Flying officer Edward Sadler of 67 Squadron RAF with a Nakajima Ki-27 that was shot down near Rangoon on 24 January 1942

No. 67 Squadron RAF was originally formed in Singapore before their redeployment to Burma in October 1941. They were equipped with thirty Buffalos inherited from 60 Squadron RAF at Mingaladon; the aircraft they received in Singapore were passed on to 488 Squadron RNZAF. They were joined by Curtiss P-40 fighters of the American Volunteer Group (Flying Tigers). AVG crews were initially impressed with the Buffalo, some even urging General Claire Chennault to trade a squadron of P-40s for Buffalos. In response, Chennault arranged a mock dogfight between both fighters, with 1st Lieutenant Erik Shilling flying the P-40 and Squadron Leader Jack Brandt flying the Buffalo. Over their training base in Toungoo, the P-40 proved to be superior to the Buffalo. When Shilling and Brandt met again fifty years later, the RAF pilot said, "how I wish I could have swapped my aircraft for yours".

The squadron first saw action on 23 December 1941, when 15 Buffalos intercepted a formation of 42 Ki-21 heavy bombers, 27 Ki-30 light bombers and 30 Ki-27 fighters during a daylight raid on Rangoon. Together with twelve P-40s, they claimed 13 bombers destroyed and seven probable; four P-40s including two pilots were lost while all the Buffalos returned safely. Nevertheless, the Japanese succeeded in bombing Rangoon, its port facilities and RAF Mingaladon, inflicting extensive damage and casualties.

The Buffalos and P-40s carried out air defenses over Rangoon and Mingaladon as well as strafing missions on Japanese airfields. Like Malaya and Singapore, lack of effective early warning systems greatly hampered British and AVG efforts to defend Burma from air raids. Reports of Japanese aircraft performance from the Malayan Campaign prompted Buffalo pilots in Burma to employ different tactics; according to Flight Sergeant Vic Bargh, "come in from above, or at the same level at the very least, then dive away before they got onto you, because if they did get onto you, well, you were shot down". One of the Buffalo's final victories of the Burma Campaign was claimed by Bargh; he found the wreckage of the bomber and had his picture taken with it as proof.

The IJAAF secured air superiority over Rangoon by early February 1942, and with the situation on the ground rapidly deteriorating, No. 67 Squadron withdrew north to Toungoo. On 13 February, the squadron moved further north to Magwe with only eight Buffalos, where they continued to carry out reconnaissance flights as well as escorting Westland Lysanders on ground attack missions. The Buffalo flew its last combat sortie with the RAF on 5 March, escorting Hawker Hurricanes and Bristol Blenheims for an attack on a Japanese airbase in Chiang Mai, Thailand. Only six Buffalos remained when the squadron withdrew to Calcutta, India on 11 March to re-equip with Hurricanes. They were swiftly relegated to training duties, though two were briefly acquired by No. 146 Squadron RAF in early April, one of which was regularly flown by Squadron Leader Count Manfred Czernin. No. 67 Squadron claimed 27 Japanese aircraft destroyed; eight Buffalos were shot down and eight pilots were killed. For their actions, Squadron Leader Jack Brandt and Flight Lieutenant Colin Pinckney were awarded the Distinguished Flying Cross (the latter posthumously), while Sergeant Gordon Williams received the Distinguished Flying Medal.

=== Netherlands East Indies ===
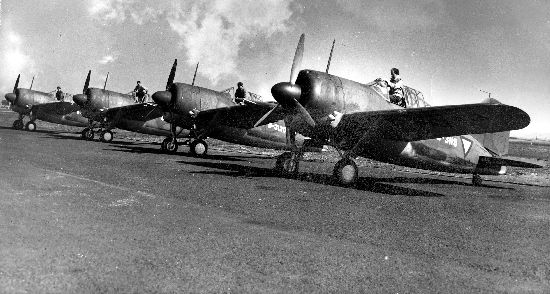
Brewster Buffalos of the ML-KNIL

The Militaire Luchtvaart van het Koninklijk Nederlands-Indisch Leger ("Military Air Service of the Royal Netherlands East Indian Army", ML-KNIL) had ordered 144 Brewster 339C and D and 339-23 models, the former with rebuilt Wright G-105 engines supplied by the Dutch and the latter two with new 1,200 hp (890 kW) Wright R-1820-40 engines purchased from Wright by Brewster. By the time the Pacific War broke out, only about 30 Buffalos had entered service in the Dutch East Indies. In total, 72 Buffalos were delivered to the Netherlands East Indies before deliveries were diverted to the RAAF. A small number served briefly at Singapore before being withdrawn for the defense of Borneo and Java.

As the Brewster 339 aircraft used by the ML-KNIL were lighter than the modified 339E Brewster Mark Is used by British, Australian, and New Zealand air forces, they were able to successfully engage the Japanese Army Nakajima Ki-43 "Oscar", although both the "Oscar" and the Japanese Navy's A6M Zero still out-climbed the 339 at combat altitudes (the Zero was faster as well). After the first few engagements, the Dutch halved the fuel and ammo load in the wing, which allowed their Buffalos (and their Hurricanes) to stay with the Oscars in turns. In February 1942 they received new model gunsights. Around the same time the Dutch started to use tracer ammunition as well. These two improved their hit ratio. Still, their lack of heavy machine guns (.50") meant their success rate wasn't as high as it could have been.

Apart from their role as fighters, the Brewster fighters were also used as dive bombers against Japanese troopships. Although reinforced by British Commonwealth Buffalo Mk I (339E) aircraft retreating from Malaya, the Dutch squadrons faced superior numbers in the air, usually odds of one against two or three. Timely early warning from British radar would have countered this deficit, especially in avoiding unnecessary losses from raids on airfields, but the British government had decided too late to send these: the first British radar stations became operational only towards the end of February.

In a major engagement above Semplak on 19 February 1942, eight Dutch Brewster fighters intercepted a formation of about 35 Japanese bombers with an escort of about 20 Zeros. The Brewster pilots destroyed 11 Japanese aircraft and lost four Brewsters; two Dutch pilots died.

Only four airworthy Buffalos remained on 7 March. Capt. Jacob van Helsdingen led this flight on its final sortie that day, and was credited with a Zero before he was killed. This made him and Lt. August Deibel the most successful Dutch pilots on the Buffalo with three victories each. Altogether, 17 ML-KNIL pilots were killed, and 30 aircraft shot down; 15 were destroyed on the ground, and several were lost to misadventure. Dutch pilots claimed 55 enemy aircraft destroyed.

=== USAAF/RAAF in Australia ===
Following the surrender of the Netherlands East Indies on 8 March 1942, a shipment of 17 Brewster B339-23 fighters ordered for the ML-KNIL was diverted to the US Fifth Air Force in Australia.

All of these Buffalos were subsequently lent to the RAAF, which gave them the serial number prefix A51–. They were used mainly for air defence duties outside frontline areas, photo-reconnaissance and as mock targets in gunnery training. They served with 1 PRU, 24 Sqn, 25 Sqn, 85 Sqn and the Air Gunnery Training School, at RAAF Base Williamtown.

Between August 1942 and November 1943, 10 of these Buffalos constituted the air defense force for Perth, while assigned to 25 and 85 Sqns at RAAF Pearce and RAAF Guildford. In 1944, all of the surviving aircraft were transferred to the USAAF.

=== U.S. Marine Corps ===
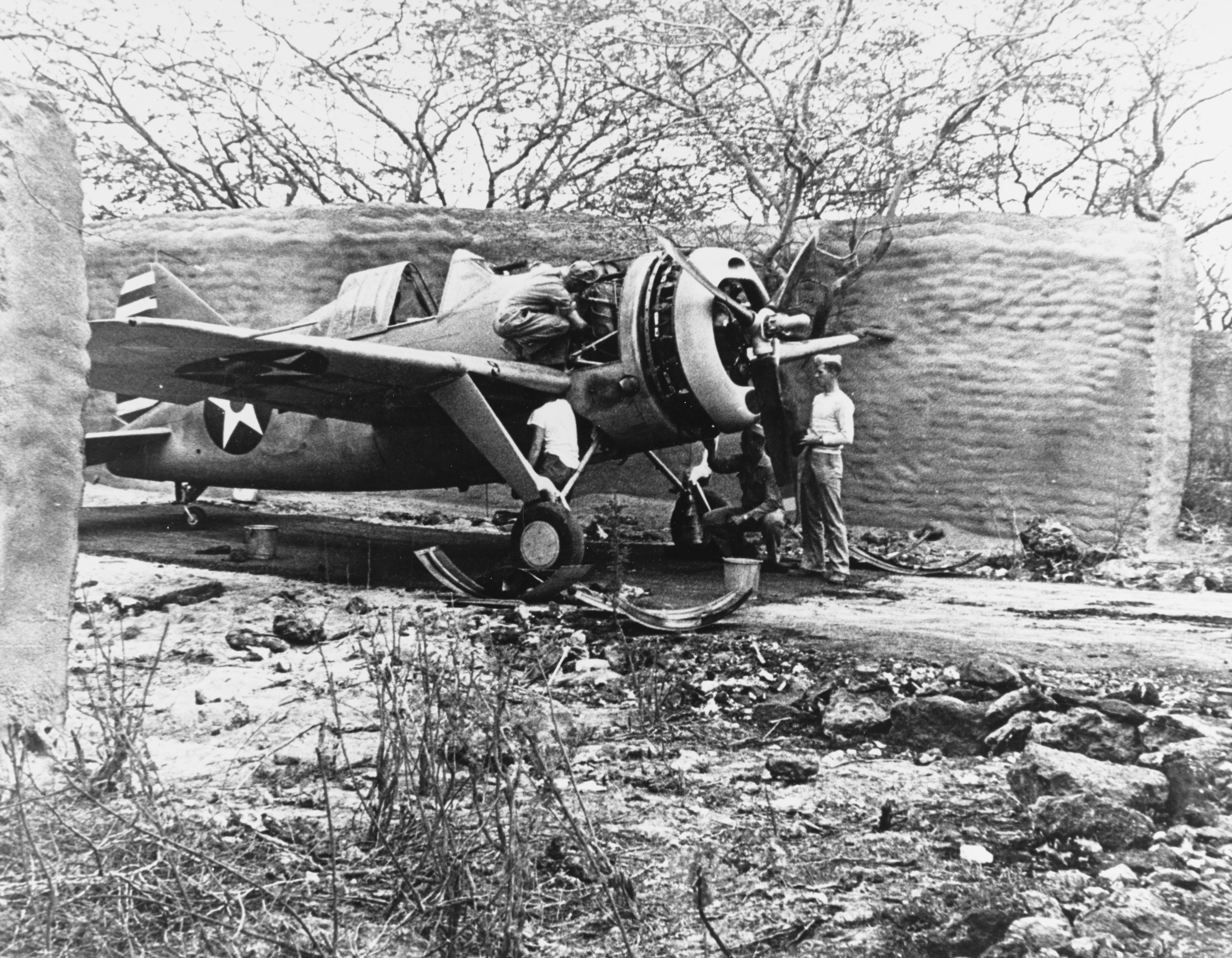
F2A-3, probably from VMF-212, at Marine Corps Air Station Ewa, Hawaii, 25 April 1942

2nd Lt. Frank McCarthy receiving the Distinguished Flying Cross from Admiral Chester Nimitz on Midway, 2 May 1942.

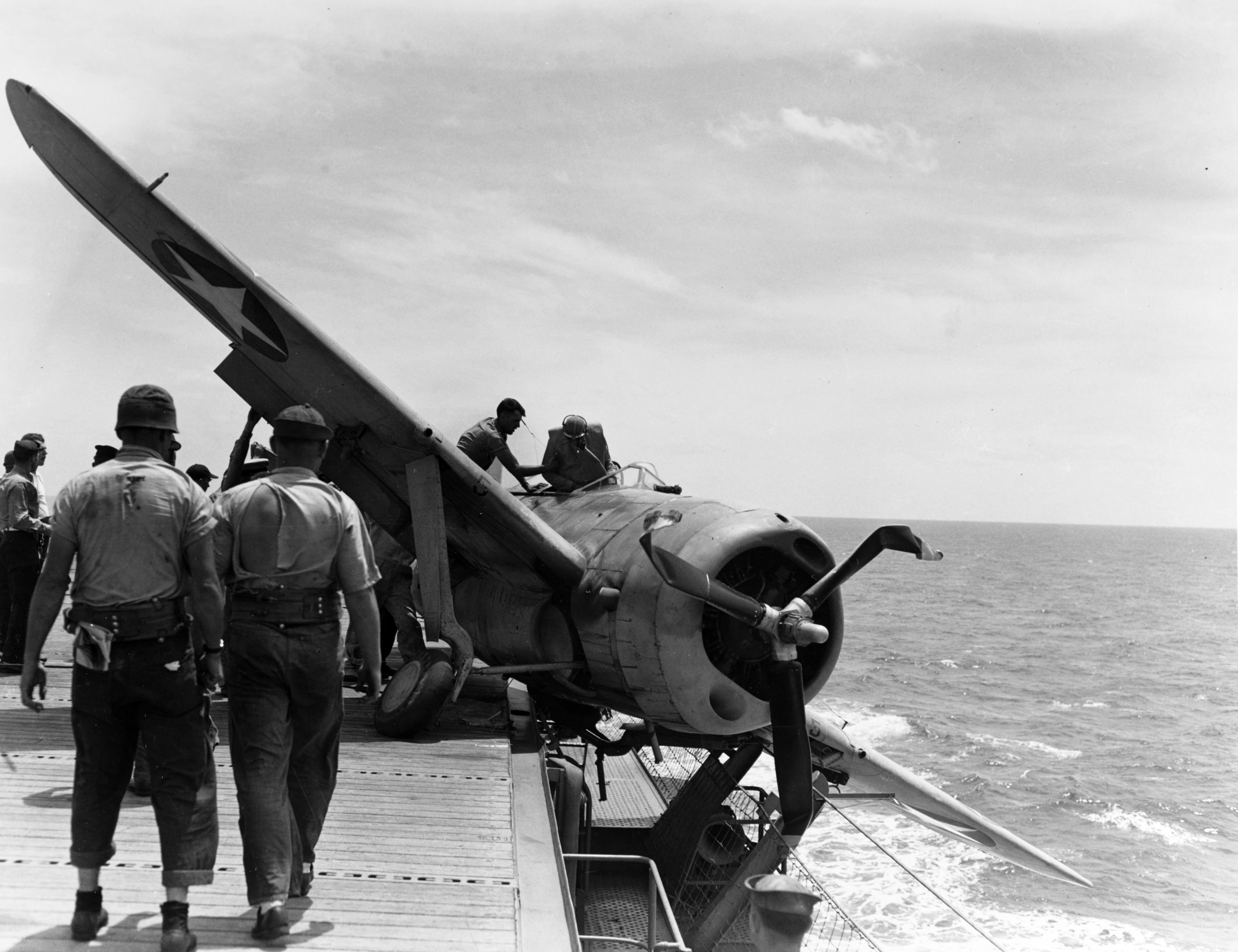
F2A-3 of VMF-211 rests in the flight deck gallery walkway after suffering landing gear failure while landing on board USS Long Island, off Palmyra Atoll, 25 July 1942. VMF-211 was the last Marine Corps unit to operate the F2A in a front-line capacity.

At Midway Island, United States Marine Corps fighter squadron VMF-221 operated a mixed group of 20 Brewster F2A-3 Buffalos and seven Grumman F4F-3 Wildcats. They were originally assigned to USS Saratoga as part of a relief force bound for Wake Island, but were diverted to Midway instead after the force was controversially recalled on 22 December 1941. Wake Island fell on the following day. The squadron first saw action on 10 March 1942 when a Kawanishi H8K "Emily" flying boat was shot down by Captain James L. Neefus (1911-1991) and 2nd Lieutenant Frank McCarthy (1916-1942) near Midway, the Buffalo's first kill in U.S. service.

From February - April 1942 the rebuilt squadron VMF-211 (most of which had been lost in the Battle of Wake Island) was re-equipped with F2A-3s and was ferried by the escort carrier Long Island to Palmyra Atoll, where it remained until recalled in July of that year, ferrying their aircraft to land on Long Island to return to Hawaii to re-equip with F4F-4s.

During the Battle of Midway in 1942, VMF-221 was destined to participate in one of the few aerial combats involving the Buffalo in U.S. military service. The initial Buffalo interception of the first Japanese air raid was led by Major Floyd B. Parks, whose 13-aircraft division did not fly in paired flights of mutually supporting aircraft. After attacking a formation of 30–40 Aichi D3A1 "Val" dive bombers escorted by 36 Zeros, the Marines, flying in two divisions of aircraft, downed several Japanese bombers before the escorting Zeros reacted; a furious dogfight developed. Thirteen out of 20 Buffalos were lost; of the six Wildcats, only two remained flyable at the end of the mission. The losses included the Marine air commander, Major Parks, who bailed out of his burning Buffalo, only to be strafed by Zeros after parachuting into the sea.

The Marine pilots who managed to shake off the Zeros used high speed split-s turns or very steep dives. These maneuvers were later found to be the best means to evade pursuit by the highly maneuverable Japanese fighters. One F2A-3 pilot, Marine Captain William Humberd, dove away from his pursuers, then attacked a Zero in a head-on pass, shooting his opponent down. In the battle, some F2A-3s suffered from inoperative guns. The nose-mounted guns' occasional failure to fire was noticed by other users as well; the phenomenon may have been caused by frayed electrical wires in the mechanism that synchronized the nose guns with the propeller. Other Buffalos had not been fitted with plate armor behind the pilot, making them vulnerable to even a single bullet or shell. Losses were aggravated due to the Japanese practice of strafing pilots who had bailed out. Second Lt. Charles S. Hughes, whose Buffalo was forced to retire at the start of the raid due to engine trouble, had a ringside view of the aerial combat:

The Zeros came in strafing immediately afterward. I saw two Brewsters trying to fight the Zeros. One was shot down and the other was saved by ground fires covering his tail. Both looked like they were tied to a string while the Zeros made passes at them.

Second Lt. Charles M. Kunz reported that after successfully downing two Val bombers, he was attacked by Japanese fighters:

I was at an altitude of about 9,000 ft, and shoved over in a dive trying to shake the plane on my tail until I was about 20 feet from the water. I was making radical turns hoping the pilot couldn't get steadied on me. I glanced out of the rear and saw that it was a Zero fighter. I continued flying on a rapid turning course at full throttle when I was hit in the head by a glancing bullet. After he fired a few short bursts he left as I had been in a general direction of 205 degrees heading away from the island. My plane was badly shot up... In my opinion, the Zero fighter has been far underestimated. I think it is probably one of the finest fighters in the present war. As for the F2A-3, (or Brewster trainer), it should be in Miami as a training plane, rather than used as a first-line fighter.

Claire Chennault's report on the Zero and air combat reached Washington in 1941, where it was disseminated to aviation forces of the U.S. Army and Navy. This information, along with the development of two-plane mutual defensive formations and tactics, were incorporated into U.S. and Marine Corps air combat training doctrine by some prescient U.S. commanders, including Lieutenant Commander "Jimmy" Thach. The Thach Weave was developed for use by Wildcat pilots against the Zero and was later adopted by other Wildcat squadrons in the Pacific.

With the emergence of new tactics for the F4F-3 and F4F-4 Wildcat, the Battle of Midway marked the end of the Buffalo in both U.S. Navy and Marine Corps fighting squadrons. Surviving F2A-3 aircraft were transported to the U.S. mainland, where they were used as advanced trainers. The introduction in late 1943 of vastly superior American carrier-borne fighters such as the F6F Hellcat and Vought F4U Corsair soon relegated the Brewster F2A-3 to a distant memory.

== Buffalo aces ==
The Finnish Air Force produced 36 Buffalo aces. The top three were Capt. Hans Wind, with 39 Buffalo air victories (out of 75), WO Eino Ilmari Juutilainen, with 34 (out of 94) and Capt. Jorma Karhunen, with 25.5 (out of 31.5). First Lt Lauri Nissinen also had victories in the type (22.5 out of 32.5).

The non-Finnish Buffalo aces were: Geoff Fisken (RNZAF), with six air victories, and Doug Vanderfield (RAAF) with five individual kills, plus one shared. Alf Clare (RAAF) and Maurice Holder (RAF) had five victories each.

== Variants ==
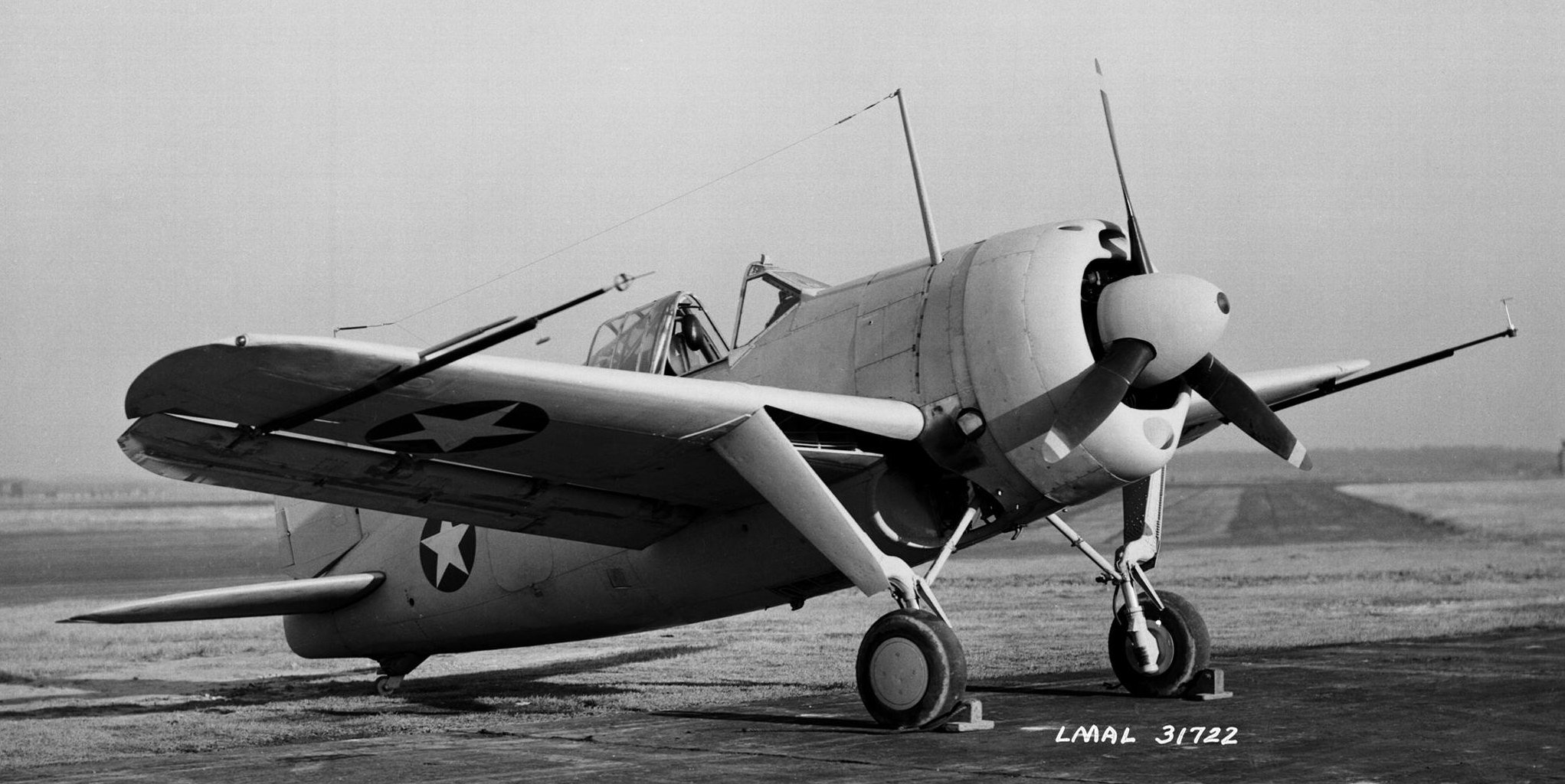
Brewster Buffalo F2A-2

XF2A-1
Prototype
F2A-1
(with Wright R-1820-34 Cyclone engine and two guns above engine cowling, plus two optional guns in the wings) for the United States Navy, 11 built
F2A-2
(with Wright R-1820-40 Cyclone engine and four guns) for the United States Navy and Marines, 43 built
F2A-3
Improved F2A-2 for the United States Navy with larger fuel tank, heavier armour, and provision to carry two underwing 100 lb (45 kg) bombs, 108 built
XF2A-4
One converted from an F2A-3
239
Export version of the F2A-1 for Finland (with Wright R-1820-G5 Cyclone engines and four guns), 44 built
339B
Export version for Belgium, 40 built (only two delivered to Belgium, the rest to the Royal Navy's Fleet Air Arm)
339C
Export version for the Netherlands East Indies with Wright GR-1820-G105 Cyclone engines; 24 built
339D
Export version for the Netherlands East Indies with 1,200 hp (890 kW) Wright R-1820-40 Cyclone engines; 48 built (47 delivered to Dutch East Indies)
339E
Export version of the F2A-2 for the Royal Air Force with Wright GR-1820-G105 Cyclone engines as the Buffalo Mk I; 170 built (also used by the RAAF and RNZAF)
339-23
Export version of the F2A-3 for the Netherlands East Indies with 1,200 hp (890 kW) Wright GR-1820-G205A engines; 20 built (17 later to the RAAF, some used by the USAAF)

== Operators ==
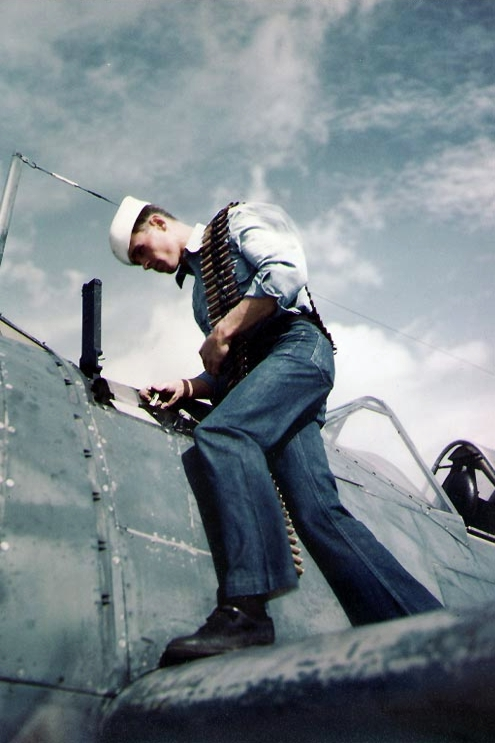
U.S. Navy F2A being rearmed in 1943

Australia
Royal Australian Air Force

No. 21 Squadron RAAF
No. 24 Squadron RAAF
No. 25 Squadron RAAF (ex-Dutch)
No. 43 Squadron RAAF
No. 85 Squadron RAAF (ex-25 Sqn.)
No. 453 Squadron RAAF
No. 452 Squadron RAAF
No. 1 PRU RAAF (ex-Dutch, Photo Reconnaissance Unit)

Finland
Finnish Air Force

No. 24 Squadron (1941–1944)
No. 26 Squadron (1944–1945)

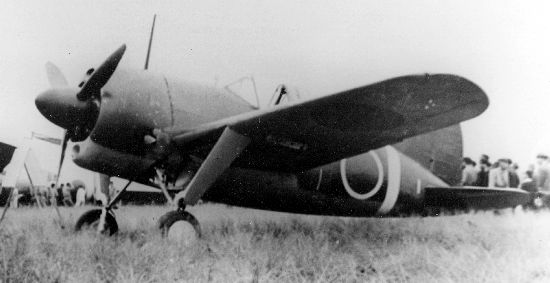
Captured Dutch Buffalo displayed as a war trophy with Japanese roundels.

Japan
Captured Buffalos were repaired and test flown, both in Japanese markings, and – starring in recreated combat footage – in incorrect RAF markings.

Netherlands
Militaire Luchtvaart KNIL

Vliegtuiggroep IV, 3e Afdeling (3-VLG-IV: 3rd Squadron, IV Group)
Vliegtuiggroep V, 1e Afdeling (1-VLG-V)
Vliegtuiggroep V, 2e Afdeling (2-VLG-V, helped defend Singapore)
Vliegtuiggroep V, 3e Afdeling (3-VLG-V)

New Zealand
Royal New Zealand Air Force

No. 488 Squadron RNZAF

United Kingdom
Royal Air Force

No. 60 Squadron RAF
No. 67 Squadron RAF (ex-60 Sqn., most pilots were RNZAF)
No. 71 Squadron RAF
No. 146 Squadron RAF (ex-67 Sqn.)
No. 243 Squadron RAF (most pilots were RNZAF)

Royal Navy Fleet Air Arm

711 Naval Air Squadron
759 Naval Air Squadron
760 Naval Air Squadron
804 Naval Air Squadron
805 Naval Air Squadron
813 Naval Air Squadron
885 Naval Air Squadron

USA
United States Army Air Forces

5th Air Force, Australia (ex-Dutch)

United States Marine Corps

VMF-111, based at Camp Kearney, Calif.
VMF-112, based at Camp Kearney, Calif.
VMD-2
VMF-211, based at Palmyra Atoll
VMF-212, based at MCAS Ewa
VMF-213, based at MCAS Ewa
VMF-214, based at MCAS Ewa
VMF-221, used in Battle of Midway
VMF-222, based at MCAS Ewa
VMF-224
VMO-251

United States Navy

VF-2
VF-3
VF-9
VJ-5
VJ-6
VS-201
Training Units at NAS Pensacola and NAS Miami

== Surviving aircraft and replicas ==
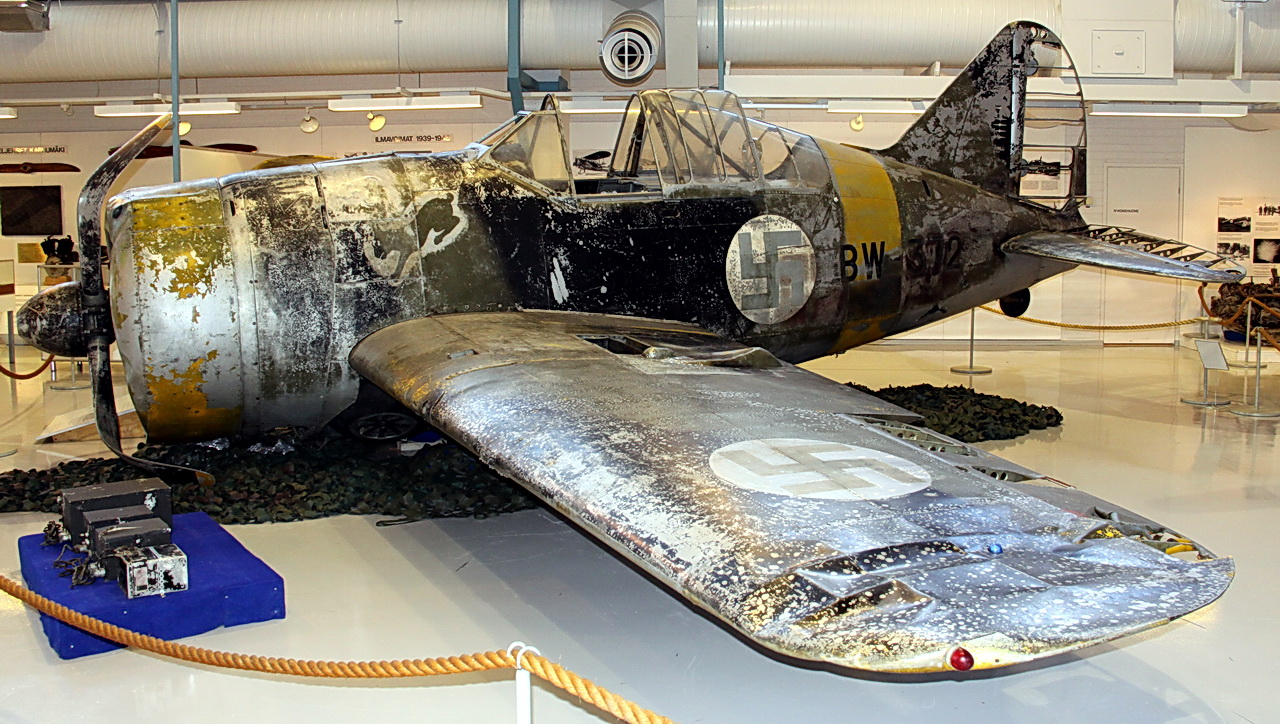
Lauri Pekuri's FAF BW-372 at the Aviation Museum of Central Finland

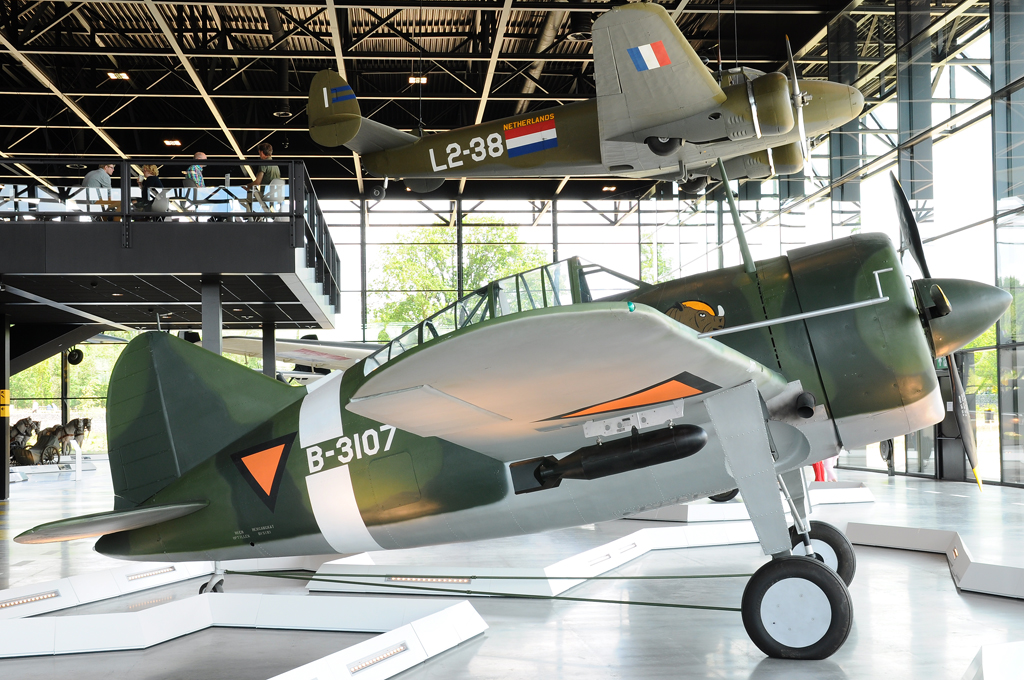
Replica of Lt. Gerard Bruggink's 339C at the National Military Museum in Soesterberg, Netherlands

Only export models of the Buffalo are preserved. There is currently a complete Finnish 239 (BW-372), a VL Humu variant (HM-671 at the Central Finland Aviation museum), and two replicas – one in ML-KNIL markings and the other in U.S. Navy markings.

Finnish Brewster Model 239 (serial no. BW-372) flown by Lt. Lauri Pekuri was damaged by a Soviet Hawker Hurricane and crashed in 1942 on Lake Big Kolejärvi, about 31 mi (50 km) from Segezha, Russia. It was rediscovered in 1998 and is now on display at the Keski-Suomen Ilmailumuseo (Aviation Museum of Central Finland). The Finnish museum also has components from FAF BW-393.

In June 2012, divers discovered the partial wreckage of a Buffalo in shallow water just off Midway Atoll. The aircraft had been ditched during February 1942, after an aborted landing attempt in bad weather by 1st Lt Charles W. Somers Jr., USMC (later Colonel, USMC Ret). Officials at the Papahanaumokuakea Marine National Monument, where the wreckage was found, have not decided whether to recover any of the parts or leave them in place.

In July 2008, a static full-scale replica 339C was completed by the Cradle of Aviation Museum in Long Island, New York. The aircraft carries the markings of an ML-KNIL fighter flown by Lt. Gerard Bruggink (two kills). It was built for the Militaire-Luchtvaartmuseum (Military Aviation Museum) at Soesterberg, the Netherlands. The Cradle of Aviation Museum houses a static full-scale replica/model F2A-2, carrying the markings of unit "201-S-13" from VS-201, aboard USS Long Island.

== Specifications (F2A-3) ==
F2A-3 Buffalo 3-view drawing

Data from United States Navy Aircraft since 1911

General characteristics

- Crew: one
- Length: 26 ft 4 in (8.03 m)
- Wingspan: 35 ft 0 in (10.67 m)
- Height: 12 ft 0 in (3.66 m)
- Wing area: 209 sq ft (19.4 m^{2})
- Airfoil:

- Root: NACA 23018
- Tip: NACA 23009

- Empty weight: 4,732 lb (2,146 kg)
- Max takeoff weight: 7,159 lb (3,247 kg)
- Powerplant: 1 × Wright R-1820-40 Cyclone 9 9-cyl air-cooled radial piston engine, 1,200 hp (890 kW)
- Propellers: 3-bladed

Performance

- Maximum speed: 321 mph (517 km/h, 279 kn)
- Cruise speed: 161 mph (259 km/h, 140 kn)
- Range: 965 mi (1,553 km, 839 nmi)
- Service ceiling: 33,200 ft (10,100 m)
- Rate of climb: 2,440 ft/min (12.4 m/s) (Note: The initial rate of climb would be reduced with completely full petrol tanks.)

Armament

- Guns: * 2 × 0.50 in (12.7 mm) nose-mounted M2 Browning machine guns
- 2 × 0.50 in (12.7 mm) wing-mounted M2 Browning machine guns
- Bombs: * 2 × bombs on underwing racks.

== See also ==
Related development

- VL Humu

Aircraft of comparable role, configuration, and era

- CAC Boomerang
- Grumman F4F Wildcat
- Hawker Sea Hurricane
- Mitsubishi A6M Zero
- Polikarpov I-16

Related lists

- List of United States Navy aircraft designations (pre-1962)
- List of military aircraft of the United States
- List of fighter aircraft
- List of aircraft of World War II
