= Gerard Bruggink =

Gerardus Meinardus Bruggink
- Born: 4 August 1917; Tubbergen, Netherlands
- Died: 5 December 2005 (aged 88); Skipperville, Alabama, United States
- Military career
- Allegiance: Netherlands
- Service years: 1939-1955
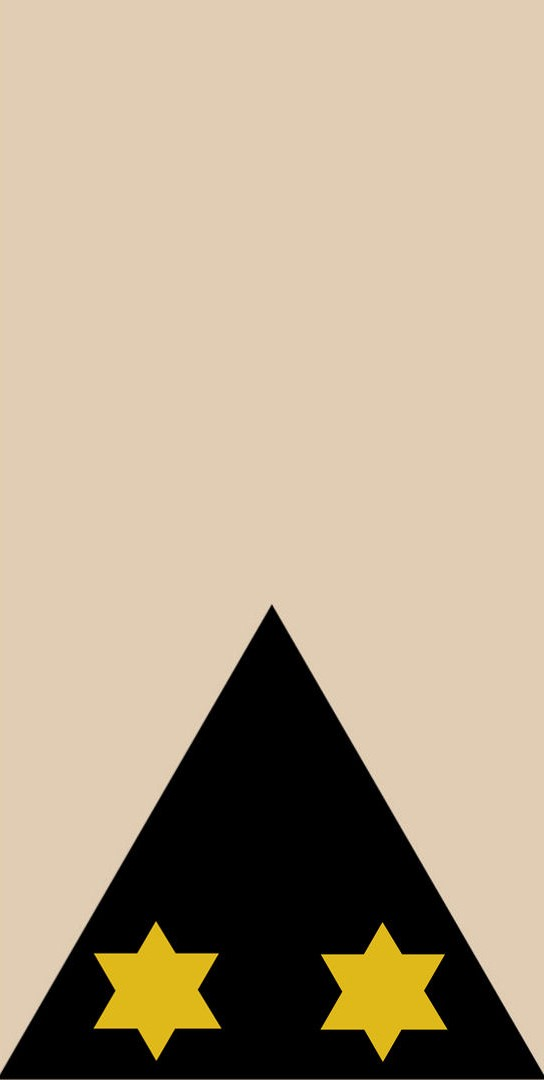
- Rank: 1st Lieutenant
- Unit: 2-VLG-V
- Conflicts: World War II; Battle of Malaya; Battle of Java
- Awards: Bronze Cross (subsequently rescinded); Airman's Cross; Knight 4th class of the Military William Order
- Other work: Flight instructor, Accident investigator

Gerardus Meinardus Bruggink (4 August 1917 – 5 December 2005) was a Dutch pilot of the Royal Netherlands East Indies Army Air Force. A recipient of the Military Order of William, he was one of only four Dutch pilots to dogfight the Japanese in the Battle of Java.

Born in Tubbergen, Overijssel, Bruggink followed a Catholic seminary. He met his wife, Corien, while serving in the Dutch East Indies and they were married in January 1942. A replica B-339C Brewster Buffalo (B-3107) was built in July 2008 and delivered to the National Military Museum in Soesterberg, Netherlands, carrying the markings of the plane flown by Bruggink.

== Military William Order flight ==
Bruggink, along with Lt. August Deibel and Officer Cadet Jan Scheffer, volunteered to join Capt. Jacob van Helsdingen on his mission using the last three working Buffalo aircraft on Andir airfield. The four pilots took off on March 7, 1942 and proceeded to Lembang to provide air support for ground troops fighting the Japanese in the city.

Helsdingen's squadron travelled 200 kilometers when they encountered a Japanese aircraft, which Deibel attacked before it escaped. Some time later, three Japanese A6M Zeros appeared. Deibel fired at two of them which turned away, but was hit in the oil tank by the third Zero and had to break off from combat. His wingman, Jan Scheffer escorted him back to Andir airfield under a tropical rainstorm, where Deibel crashed landed his aircraft without suffering any injuries. Helsdingen and Bruggink remained above Lembang, but were now dogfighting six Zeroes. Helsdingen was soon shot down, but Bruggink managed to escape into the clouds before returning to Andir airfield. Dutch forces in Lembang surrendered the next day. All four Dutch pilots were awarded the Military William Order on July 14, 1948. Bruggink also received the Airman's Cross.

== Later life ==
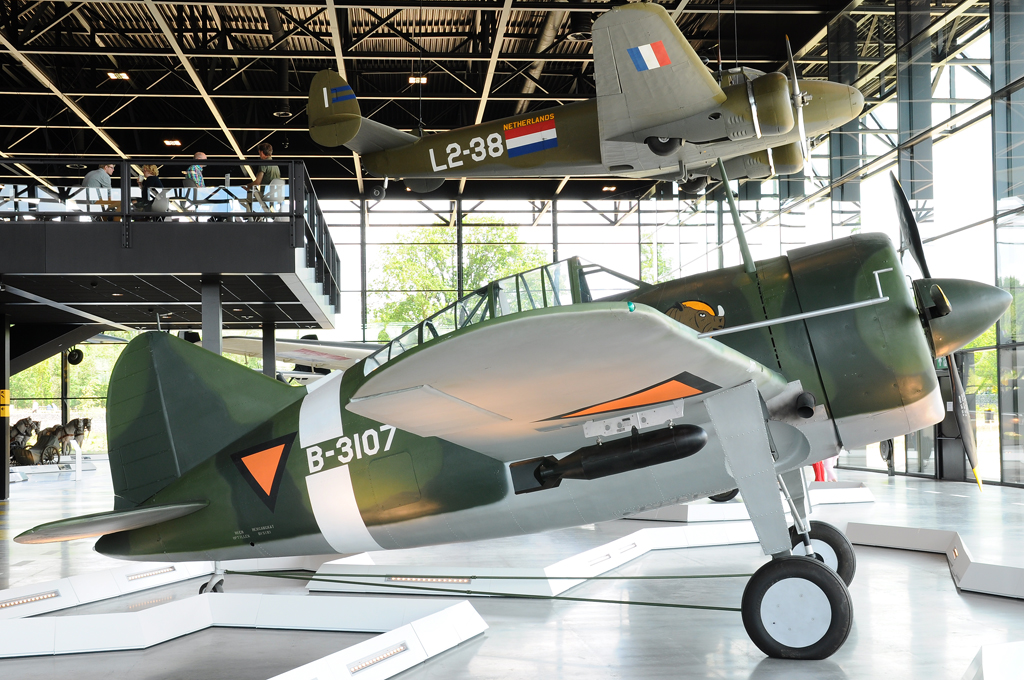
Brewster Buffalo replica painted to resemble Bruggink's aircraft on display at the National Military Museum in Soesterberg, Netherlands

After the Dutch East Indies surrendered, Bruggink became a prisoner of war and was forced to work on the infamous Burma Railway, while his wife was interned in a camp in Java. They were reunited in December 1945, after the war.

In 1955, Bruggink left the Royal Netherlands Air Force and emigrated with his family to the United States, where he worked as a flight instructor for civil aviation in Texas. In 1959 Bruggink started working for various research organizations inspecting aircraft incidents and air safety. Initially a civilian flight instructor in Texas for the U.S. Army, Bruggink later worked for Aviation Crash Injury Research (AvCIR) in Phoenix. In 1963, Bruggink worked for USABAAR (U.S. Army Board for Aviation Accident Research) at Fort Rucker, Alabama. In 1969 he was appointed to be Chief of Human Factors at the National Transportation Safety Board (NTSB). He retired from the NTSB in 1982 as the Deputy Director, Office of Aviation Safety, but maintained a keen interest in aviation safety matters and published numerous air-safety-related papers. He died in his home in Skipperville, Alabama, on 5 December 2005, after a long illness. He was 88 years old.

== See also ==
- Jacob van Helsdingen
- August Deibel
