= MS Nana Maru =

History

Empire of Japan
- Name: Nana Maru
- Owner: 1939: Kokusai Kisen K.K.; 1939-1941: Osaka Shosen Kaisha; 1941-1942: Imperial Japanese Navy
- Builder: Harima Zosensho K.K.
- Laid down: 17 June 1939
- Launched: 16 April 1940
- Completed: 29 June 1940
- Fate: Sunk by Royal Netherlands East Indies Army Air Force aircraft, 23 January 1942

General characteristics
- Type: Cargo ship
- Tonnage: 6,757 GRT
- Length: 438 ft 6 in (133.65 m)
- Beam: 58 ft 4 in (17.78 m)
- Speed: 19.5 knots (36.1 km/h)

The Nana Maru (南阿丸) was a Japanese cargo ship from the Seia Maru-class, which was sunk in military service by ML-KNIL Brewsters during World War II. It was part of the 11th Air Fleet.

== History ==
Construction was ordered on 17 June 1939 by Kokusai Kisen K.K.. During construction, the ship was taken over by Osaka Shosen Kaisha. It was built by Harima Zosensho K.K. and was laid down and named Nana Maru on 16 April 1940. On 29 June, construction was finished and the ship started service between Japan and South Africa. Because of the war, the Japanese Imperial Navy requisitioned the ship on 21 September 1941 so that it could be used as a transport ship.

=== Sinking ===
On 23 January 1942, during the Battle of Balikpapan, the Japanese troop convoy of which the Nana Maru was part, was attacked at 00°10′N 118°00′E in the Makassar Strait by aircraft from the Royal Netherlands East Indies Army Air Force. Eerste luitenant Pieter Anna Hoyer and Sergeant Albert Eduard Stoové of the 2-VLG-V squadron dropped bombs from their Brewster F2A Buffalo onto the ship's deck. At 17:30 the captain ordered abandon ship, the crippled Nana Maru sank at 21:00 after a large explosion.
