= 2-VLG-V =

- 2nd Squadron, Airgroup 5
- Active: 1 July 1941
- Disbanded: 9 March 1942
- Country: Dutch East Indies
- Allegiance: Allied Forces
- Branch: Army Airforce
- Role: Multirole
- Size: 12 Pilots
- Mascot(s): Magere Hein (Death)
- Equipment: Fighter Aircraft
- Engagements: Malayan campaign Battle of Java; Battle of Kalijati; Battle of Tjiater Pass; Battle of Balikpapan
- Decorations: 5 x Military Order of William; 2 x Bronze Cross; 4 x Airman's Cross

Commanders
- Commander: Capt. J.P. van Helsdingen

Aircraft flown
- Fighter: Brewster 339C; Brewster 339D

2e Afdeling, Vliegtuiggroep V (2nd Squadron, Airgroup 5) or short 2-VLG-V was a squadron of the Royal Netherlands East Indies Army Air Force from 1 July 1941 to 8 March 1942.

== Establishment ==
Before the war in Europe, the Royal Netherlands East Indies Army Air Force (ML-KNIL) consisted of old planes and a handful of pilots. The Netherlands already had plans to reorganize the ML-KNIL and when Nazi-Germany overcame the Netherlands, it was given the first priority. On 1 June 1941, the 'Tweede Afdeling' (second division) was formed on Semplak. This would be a fighter division, consisting mainly of Curtiss-Wright Model 21 Interceptors and Brewster B-339C/D Buffalos. The first squadron (1-VLG-V) would use the interceptors, but because those were not delivered yet, 1-VLG-V was used as a test-squadron for the newly arrived Buffalos. When at the end of June the first interceptors arrived, a second squadron within this division was created on 1 July 1941, 2-VLG-V. The squadron leader was Capt. Jacob Pieter van Helsdingen. The plan was that 2-VLG-V, consisting of 12 pilots, would get 12 ready to use Buffalos, and 12 spare Buffalos. However, at the end of the war, only 17 Buffalos would have been used by 2-VLG-V.

== Battles ==
=== Battle of Malaya ===
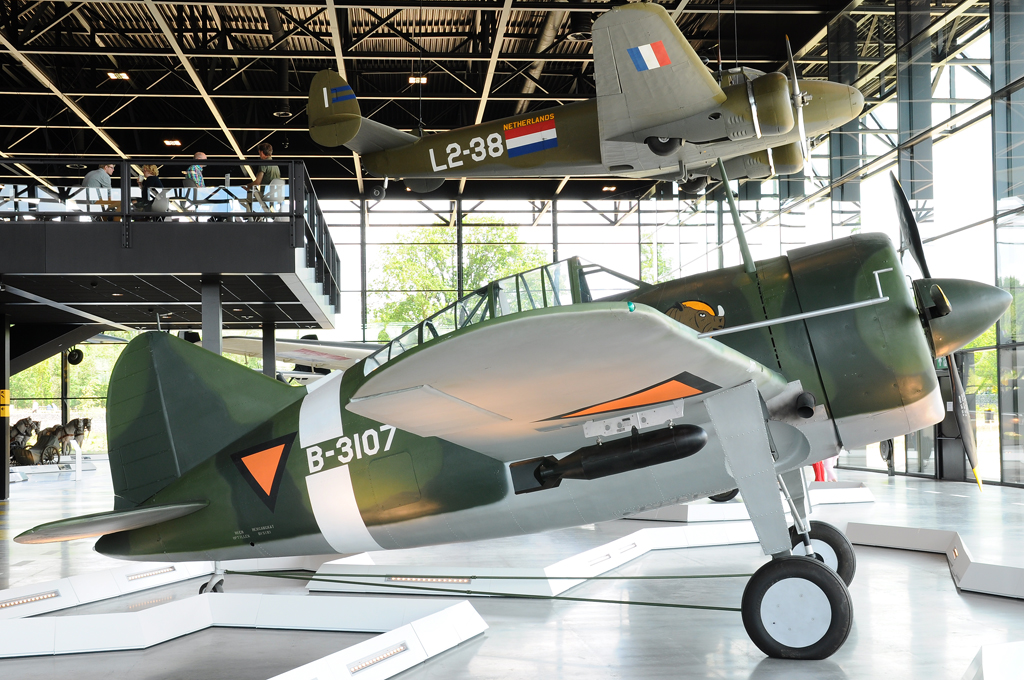
Brewster B-339C Buffalo replica on display at the National Military Museum in Soesterberg, Netherlands

On 25 December 1941, 12 Buffalos together with 12 pilots of 2-VLG-V were stationed at Kallang, for the defence of Singapore. These Buffalos were fitted with a bomb-rack, so that they could be used for dive-bombing. The Buffalos of the ML-KNIL didn't have bulletproof glass (it was ordered but Brewster couldn't deliver it). However the Buffalos from 2-VLG-V that helped defend Singapore were fitted with bulletproof glass from damaged British buffalos. During several actions above and near Singapore, 2-VLG-V managed to sink a Japanese destroyer, and shot down four Japanese aircraft. During the actions above Singapore, one pilot from 2-VLG-V was killed. The pilots and Buffalos that flew above Singapore were:

Aircraft	Pilot	Extra information	Status
B-399	Vdg. J.F. Scheffer	On 7 January 1942, Scheffer crashed during a landing. Aircraft was written off, pilot not wounded.	-
B-3100	1st Lt. A.G. Deibel	On 12 January 1942, Deibel was shot down by a Nakajima Ki-27. Deibel saved himself with his parachute, but the aircraft was lost. After this Deibel flew in B-398.	-
B-3103	Vdg. F. Swarts	On 15 January 1942, Swarts was shot down above Singapore by a Nakajima Ki-43 Hayabusa.	KIA
B-3105	Sgt. A. Voorbij	On 15 January 1942, Voorbij had to make a crash landing in the sea near Biliton. He survived the crash and floated alongside the wreckage. When ships arrived at the crash scene Voorbij wasn't there anymore.	MIA
B-3107	Sgt. G.M. Bruggink	-	-
B-3108	Vdg. J.H.A. Ellecom	About 6 January 1942, Ellecom crashed during a start from Palembang I. Aircraft was written off and the pilot heavily wounded.	-
B-3110	Capt. J.P. van Helsdingen	-	-
B-3111	Vdg. F. Pelder	-	-
B-3115	Vdg. R.A. Rothkrans	-	-
B-3117	Sgt. A.E. Stoové	-	-
?	Sgt. N.G. de Groot	-	-
?	2nd Lt. P.A. Hoyer	-	-

=== Battle of Java ===
On 18 January 1942 the Buffalos that fought above Singapore were called back to help defend Java, prior to the Battle of Singapore. Because of several crashes and losses the squadron had to be reorganized. A couple of pilots from other squadrons were transferred to 2-VLG-V, and all the Buffalos were re-arranged. So did Deibel, who was shot down above Singapore with B-3100, and crashed with B-398 received the former aircraft of squadron leader Van Helsdingen. While Van Helsdingen received a new aircraft. Below is a short list of the re-arrangement as far as known:

Aircraft	Pilot	Extra Information	Status
B-3107	Sgt. G.M. Bruggink	-	-
B-3110	1st Lt. A.G. Deibel	-	-
B-3111	Vdg. F. Pelder	-	-
B-3115	Vdg. R.A. Rothkrans	On 23 January 1942, Rothkrans was shot down during an air raid on the Japanese fleet near Balikpapan.	KIA
B-3117	Sgt. A.E. Stoové	-	-
B-3118	Capt. J.P. van Helsdingen	On 7 March 1942, van Helsdingen participated in the last defence action of the ML-KNIL. He and Sgt. Bruggink encountered six Mitsubishi A6Ms. Bruggink managed to dive into clouds, however van Helsdingen responded to late and was shot down.	KIA
B-3132	Vdg. J.P. Kuijpers	On 19 February, Kuijpers was shot down near Semplak by a Nakajima Ki-43 Hayabusa. The aircraft went down and Kuijpers was killed in action. Kuijpers joined 2-VLG-V after their return from Singapore. Before probably served in 1-VLG-V or 3-VLG-V.	KIA
?	Sgt. N.G. de Groot	On 19 February, de Groot was shot down near Semplak by a Nakajima Ki-43 Hayabusa. The aircraft went down and De Groot was killed in action.	KIA
?	2nd Lt. P.A. Hoyer	-	-
?	Vdg. J.F. Scheffer	-	-
?	Vdg. P.C. 't Hart	-	-

On 19 January, 8 Buffalos from 2-VLG-V intercepted a formation of about 35 Japanese bombers with an escort of about 20 Zeros. The Buffalo pilots destroyed 11 Japanese aircraft. Vdg. J.P. Kuijpers, Sgt. N.G. de Groot, Vdg. J. Scheffer, and Sgt. P.C. 't Hart were all shot down, Kuijper and de Groot were killed.

=== Battle of Balikpapan ===
In the afternoon of 23 January, all Buffalos from 2-VLG-V together with several Buffalos from 3-VLG-V and nine Martin Model 166 bombers attacked the Japanese fleet in the Makassar Strait. One pilot (Rothkrans) was shot down and killed during this action. The Buffalos were all fitted with bomb-racks and two 110 lb (50 kg) bombs. The Buffalos from 2-VLG-V were given 8 positive hits on several ships. One ship, the Nana Maru was sunk.

On Sunday, 1 March, at 5:30, nine Brewster Buffalos set out for Eretanwetan, one flight of four aircraft of 2-VLG-V led by Captain van Helsdingen, the other flight - from 1-VLG-V - led by Captain van Rest. Three Glenn Martin Bombers of 3-VLG-III also took part in this action. One Japanese transport was claimed sunk, but the Glenn Martins also lost one of their number; Lieutenant B. Groenendijk and his crew were killed in action. One of the Brewsters belly-landed at Andir airfield, the pilot being unable to lower his undercarriage.

== Last flight ==
On 7 March 1942, van Helsdingen was given the order to give air support to Royal Dutch East Indies Army forces fighting in Lembang. Despite the Japanese having an almost complete air superiority over Java, he nevertheless chose to take off from Andir airfield. He asked all available pilots who wanted to volunteer. All pilots volunteered and van Helsdingen picked four pilots who then jumped in the four last remaining Buffalos. Just before take-off, van Helsdingen was informed by another pilot that one of the chosen pilots was married. Despite being married himself van Helsdingen took the place of the married pilot, and the four Buffalos took off. The three other pilots were: 1st Lieutenant August Deibel, Sergeant Gerard Bruggink and Officer Cadet Jan Scheffer. After only travelling 200 kilometers (120 mi), they ran into three Mitsubishi A6Ms. Deibel's plane was hit in the oil tank and he had to break off from combat. His wingman, Scheffer, escorted him back to Andir airfield, where Deibel crash landed his aircraft without injury. The other two remained above Lembang, but were now dogfighting six Mitsubishi A6Ms. Van Helsdingen was soon shot down, but Bruggink managed to escape into the clouds before returning to Andir airfield. The Dutch forces in Lembang surrendered the next day. Bruggink and Deibel were awarded the Military William Order, the highest award available from the Netherlands, while van Helsdingen and Scheffer (who died a prisoner of war) were posthumously awarded the honour on 14 July 1948.

== Decorations ==
Even though the squadron was short-lived, it has been one of the most highly decorated squadrons of the Dutch East Indies.

1 x Knight 3rd Class of the Military Order of William

Capt. J.P. van Helsdingen (R.O. no 5 of July 14, 1948. Posthumously awarded.)

4 x Knight 4th Class of the Military Order of William

Capt. J.P. van Helsdingen (R.O. no 15 of February 11, 1942. Retracted when receiving MWO3 on July 14, 1948)
1st Lt. A.G. Deibel (R.O. no 5 of July 14, 1948)
1st Lt. J.F. Scheffer (R.O. no 5 of July 14, 1948. Posthumously awarded.)
Sgt. G.M. Bruggink (R.O. no 5 of July 14, 1948)

2 x Bronze Cross

2nd Lt. P.A. Hoyer (R.O. no 01z of February 24, 1942)
Ens. R.A. Rothkrans (R.O. no 01z of February 24, 1942. Posthumously awarded.)

4 x Airman's Cross

Capt. J.P. van Helsdingen (R.O. no 01z of January 27, 1942)
Sgt. G.M. Bruggink (R.O. no 01z of January 27, 1942. Retracted when receiving MWO4 on July 14, 1948)
Sgt. A.E. Stoové (R.O. no 01z of February 24, 1942)
Sgt. P.C. 't Hart (R.O. no 63 of January 9, 1948)
