= Gus Winckel =

Dutch World War II hero

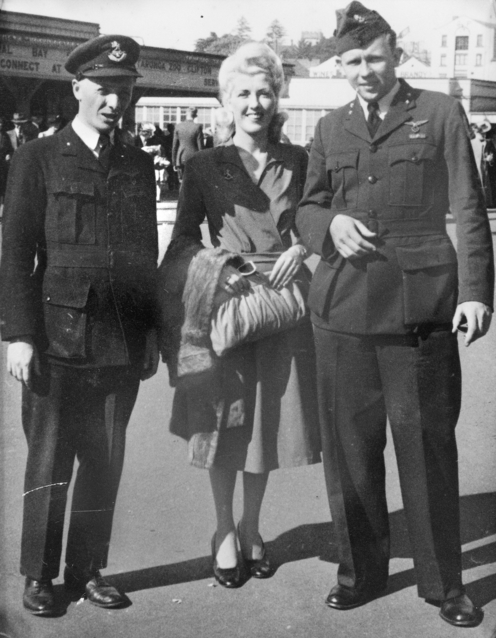
- Gus Winckel (right) standing with a fellow No. 18 Squadron member
- Born: 3 November 1912; Muntok, Dutch East Indies
- Died: 17 August 2013 (aged 100); Pukekohe, New Zealand
- Military career
- Allegiance: Netherlands
- Branch: Military Aviation of the Royal Netherlands East Indies Army
- Rank: Lieutenant
- Nicknames: Lucky Bill, Babyface Killer
- Unit: No. 18 (NEI) Squadron RAAF
- Conflicts: World War II; Attack on Broome; Indonesian National Revolution; Politionele acties
- Awards: Bronze Cross with Honorable Mention; Bronze Lion

Willem Frederick August "Gus" Winckel (3 November 1912 – 17 August 2013) was a Dutch military officer and pilot who flew for the Royal Netherlands East Indies Air Force (ML-KNIL) in World War II. During the attack on Broome, Western Australia, on 3 March 1942, Winckel managed to land his plane full of refugees safely on the Broome airstrip just before the Japanese attack. He then dismounted the plane's machine gun and shot down one of the Japanese fighters, the only Allied "kill" during the attack.

Shortly after the attack on Broome, Winckel was sent on a mission to Bandung, Java, to recover several officers from the Allied headquarters, which was under threat of being overrun. He served the remainder of the war with No. 18 (Netherlands East Indies) Squadron RAAF in Australia. After World War II, he fought in the Dutch Politionele acties.

== Early life ==
Winckel was born on 3 November 1912 in Muntok, Bangka Island, in what was then the Dutch East Indies. On the island his parents ran a trading store in commodities such as rubber, tin and sugar. Winckel had an untroubled childhood and at age fifteen was sent back to the Netherlands to study at the nautical school in Delfzijl. He stayed with his grandparents while studying, and three years later became a seaman first class for the merchant marine. He specialised in navigation. In 1931, when he was aged nineteen, Winckel started working as a quartermaster on the freighter Pallau, which sailed between the Netherlands and Java. After his work on the ship he went to the island of Borneo to work on oil rigs. By 1935 he returned to the Netherlands once more, this time to work for the Royal Netherlands Navy as a submarine torpedo calibrator.

During his time in the Navy, a friend showed him a flyer for a pilot position at the Netherlands East Indies Air Force, which was being formed at the time. Winckel joined the Air Force in 1935 and became a pilot at age 23. Between 1935 and 1942 he flew transports across the Dutch East Indies, mainly in Lockheed Lodestars.

== Attack on Broome and flight to Java ==
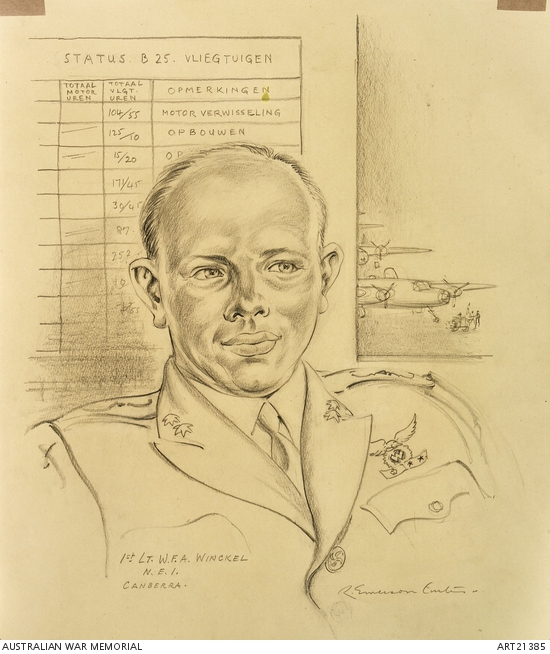
Drawing of Gus Winckel by R. Emerson Curtis

On 3 March 1942, Flight Lieutenant Winckel was transporting refugees from the Bandung, Dutch East Indies, to Perth, Western Australia, in his Lockheed Lodestar. He had just stopped on the Broome Airfield to refuel when Broome was attacked by nine Japanese Zero fighter planes on a long-distance raid from Kupang, Timor. Winckel saw the danger of his plane being on the open airstrip and proceeded to dismount the Colt 7.99mm machine gun from the plane. When one of the Zeros, piloted by Osamu Kudō, flew over at low altitude, Winckel managed to shoot him out of the air; the crash killed Kudō. Winckel was thereby credited with the raid's only "kill" on the Allied side. He also believed that he hit another Japanese plane that had to ditch in the sea. The Japanese destroyed 22 Allied aircraft at Broome, many of them flying boats used for refugee transport and moored in Roebuck Bay. Winckel suffered severe burns to his hand during the attack, as he had to hold the machine-gun barrel to aim. His hand was treated and Winckel flew medical evacuations for the next two days without rest.

Meanwhile, Japanese forces were taking over Java and threatening the Allied headquarters at Bandung. On 5 March, the Allied command decided that several senior RAF and RAAF officers had to be evacuated from Bandung. Winckel was chosen as the pilot. He protested the decision, arguing that his lack of rest would hinder his chances of finding Bandung in the dark as he did not have any electronic aids. However, Winckel was seen to be one of the most experienced pilots because of his terrain knowledge as a flight instructor at Bandung and his recent refugee flights. Another factor was that his Lodestar, although it had been damaged in the attack on Broome, was considered the most suitable plane for the evacuation mission. Winckel flew to Java, where he managed to land his plane on a road lit by jeep headlights. He picked up fourteen passengers, refuelled the plane and successfully returned to Australia.

== Subsequent war service ==
Following the attack on Broome and his evacuation mission, Winckel was sent to Moruya, New South Wales, where he joined No. 18 (Netherlands East Indies) Squadron RAAF, which had been formed on 4 April 1942. From Moruya he patrolled the Eastern Australian shore. At the end of May 1942, a Japanese midget submarine attacked Sydney Harbour. Winckel and his fellow pilots were subsequently ordered to patrol for submarines. During a patrol on 5 June 1942, Winckel attacked what he believed was a Japanese submarine in his B-25 Mitchell bomber. The perceived success was welcomed after the recent submarine attack and Winckel was personally congratulated by Australian Prime Minister John Curtin. This was one of a large number of claimed successes against Japanese submarines during this period. However, postwar research indicates that no Japanese submarines were sunk off the Australian east coast during the war. Winckel spent the rest of the war with No. 18 Squadron and served from MacDonald Airfield and Batchelor Airfield in Northern Australia as a pilot on operations, and as an instructor working in Canberra. During the war, he was nicknamed "Lucky Bill" by his colleagues and "Babyface Killer" by the Japanese.

While a member of No. 18 Squadron, Winckel flew to the Dutch East Indies in late 1945 as part of an unauthorized "Recovery of Allied Prisoners of War and Internees" mission. Winckel was searching for his mother and sister but was unable to find them. Some time later another pilot flew over the Banjoe Biroe internment camp and saw the name 'NINI' written on the ground with flour. This was the name of Winckel's sister, to draw the attention of her brother, who she assumed was looking for her. Shortly afterwards, Winckel himself flew over the camp and dropped a letter to her, followed four days by a supply of food.

== Post-war life ==
After the war, Winckel was sent back to Indonesia to fight in the Dutch Politionele acties. Winckel had met his future wife Yvonne prior to World War II; they were married during the Dutch Politionele acties. The couple fled Indonesia after the country achieved its independence, and returned to the Netherlands where Winckel became an Air Force test pilot.

The couple emigrated to New Zealand in 1951. Winckel gained his commercial pilot license there and joined the Royal New Zealand Air Force Reserve. He flew de Havilland Tiger Moths out of Whanganui for a time, but resigned as he considered the flying too dangerous owing to lax safety standards. The family moved to Nelson and Winckel found work in a flying school. He made his final flight in 1960. Afterwards he ran several businesses and worked as an engineer until 1977. He and his wife moved to Queensland, Australia, three years later. They returned to New Zealand in 2005 and settled down in Pukekohe.

In 2009, a statue in Moruya was unveiled for Winckel and the other airmen that flew out of the airfield; Winckel and Member of Parliament Mike Kelly attended. A street in Broome was also named after Winckel. He died on 17 August 2013 after suffering complications of a broken hip caused by a fall six months earlier; he was survived by Yvonne and their three sons.

== Decorations ==
- Bronze Lion (Initially a Bronze Cross was later upgraded to a Bronze Lion)
- Airman's Cross
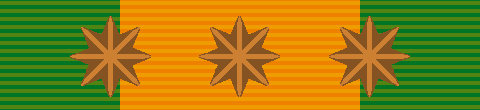
- War Remembrance Cross
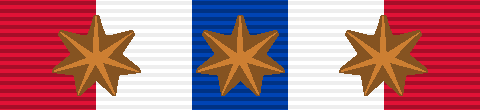
- Decoration for Order and Peace
- Defence Medal
