= Stoové =

- Pronunciation: Sto-vay
- Gender: Masculine

Origin
- Languages: German, Dutch
- Origin: Stuve

Other names
- Variant forms: Stoove, Stufe, Stuve, Stuwe

Stoové is a surname deriving from the German surname Stuve. The surname changed to Stoove (without acute accent) when Hinrich Stuve (13 August 1722 – 26 October 1769) and his son Johann Henrich Stuve (20 April 1760 – 14 December 1825) both from Bockhop, Germany emigrated to the Netherlands and changed their names into Hendrik Stoove and Jan Hendrik Stoove. The acute accent first appeared on the birth certificate from a nephew from Jan Hendrik Stoove, Cornelis Stoové.

== List of people ==
Notable persons with the surname Stoové include:

- Albert Eduard Stoové, Dutch air force pilot.
- Errol Frank Stoové, Dutch chief executive.
- Margot Cornelia Stoové, Dutch Supreme Court (College van Beroep voor het bedrijfsleven) justice.
- Mark Stoové, Australian Professor, Public Health academic (Burnet Institute)
