= Albert Eduard Stoové =

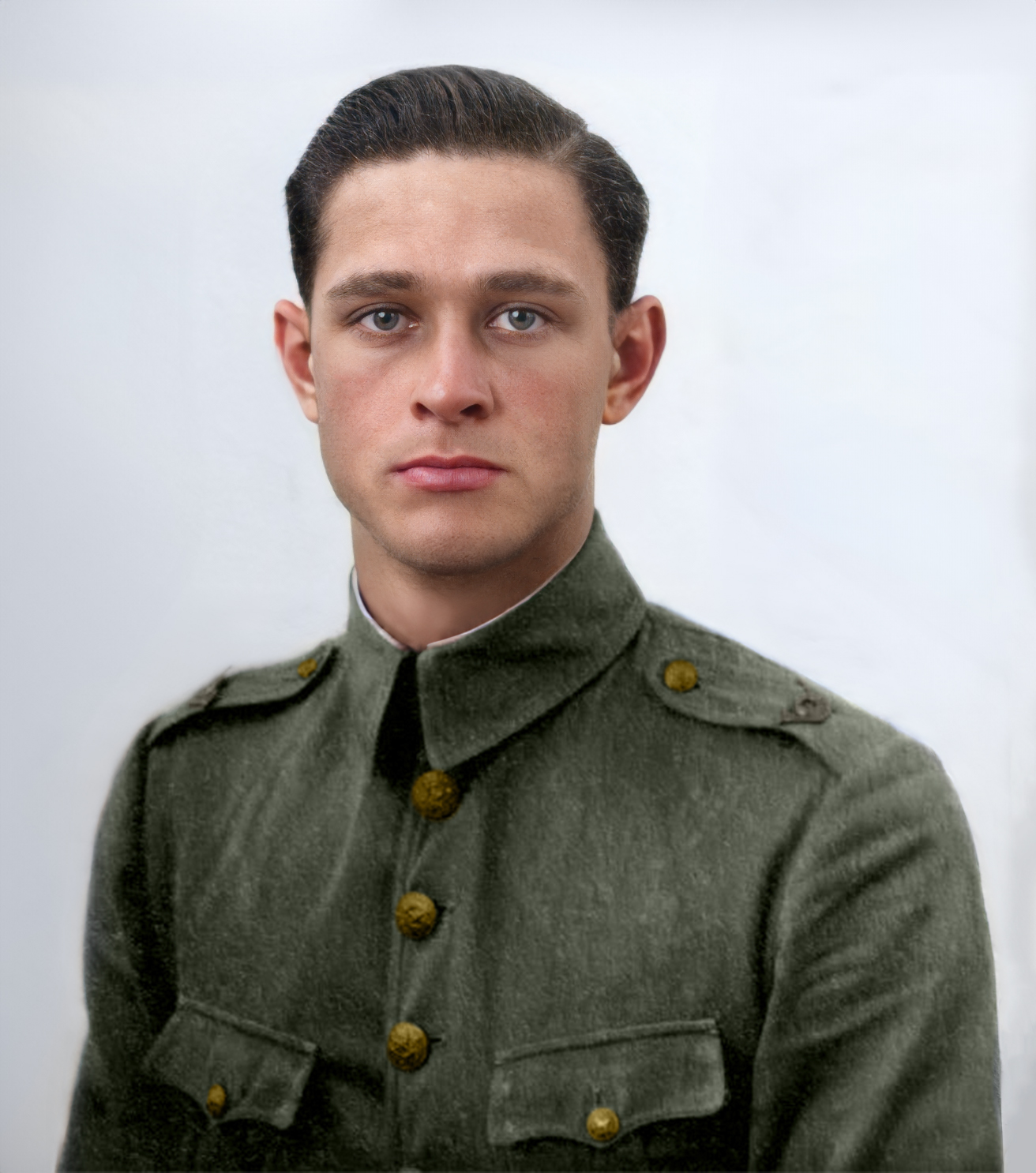
- Albert Eduard at age 19.
- Born: 26 December 1920; Yogyakarta, Dutch East Indies
- Died: 23 September 2010 (aged 89); Delft, Netherlands
- Military career
- Allegiance: Dutch East Indies; Netherlands
- Branch: Royal Netherlands East Indies Army Air Force; Royal Netherlands Air Force
- Service years: 1939–1946; 1954–1976
- Rank: Sergeant
- Nickname: Ed
- Conflicts: World War II; Battle of Malaya; Battle of Muar; Battle of Balikpapan; Battle of Java
- Awards: Vliegerkruis
- Other work: Car Salesman, Car Mechanic, Director Insurance Company

Albert Eduard Stoové (Yogyakarta (Netherlands East Indies), 26 December 1920 – Delft (Netherlands), 23 September 2010) was a sergeant in the Royal Netherlands East Indies Army Air Force at the start of World War II. For several actions with the 2-VLG-V squadron under command of Captain Jacob Pieter van Helsdingen he received the Vliegerkruis on 24 February 1942.

== Before World War II ==
=== Childhood ===
Albert Eduard (Ed) Stoové was born on 26 December 1920, the third of eight children of Jozeph Leophinus Gaillard Stoové and Louise Caroline Françoise Manz, in Yogyakarta, Netherlands East Indies. His father was of Dutch and German descent; his mother came from a Swiss background. His father was fairly affluent, owning a dairy farm named "Louise" in Djetis He had trained racehorses and jockeys, delivering racehorses to Sultan Hamengkubuwono VIII of Yogyakarta, so Stoové had a relatively easy childhood.

=== Start of service ===
Having just turned 18 in December 1938, Stoové had to report for duty in January 1939. After basic training he joined the Navy, but as he did not feel like being away at sea for months he was granted a transfer to the air force. Because of his family background he was allowed to start pilot training at Kalidjati airfield in Bandoeng-Java. Here he trained several months in a Koolhoven FK 51, and received his wings in December 1939. At first he flew Glenn Martin 139 bombers, but within six months transferred to fighter planes. After a re-organisation of all the squadrons, Stoové was added to the newly formed second squadron of aircraft group five (short 2-VLG-V) on 1 July 1941. There he received a "personal" aircraft, a Brewster F2A Buffalo with serial number B-3117.

== World War II ==
=== Battle of Malaya ===
Dutch support for the British army in Singapore had already been agreed before World War II broke out in the Pacific. From October 1940 the Dutch and British agreed to share military information, and one month later the British, Dutch and Australians decided to defend the Pacific area together. On 9 December 1941 several squadrons from the Royal Netherlands East Indies Army Air Force (ML-KNIL), including Stoové's squadron, 2-VLG-V, were sent to Kallang Airfield. ML-KNIL stationed 27 Glenn Martin 139 bombers and 12 Brewster Buffalo fighters at Kallang Airfield for the defense of British Singapore.

Stoové flew several missions from this airfield; his squadron successfully torpedoed a Japanese destroyer, and they shot down four Japanese fighter planes. During the defense of Singapore one Dutch pilot, Sgt. Groot, lost his life. On 18 January 1942 Stoové's squadron headed back to Java for the defense of the islands of the Dutch East Indies. Stoové, together with seven other Brewster Buffalo pilots flew to Semplak, while the other pilots went to Andir and Tjilitian. As the Dutch retreated on the 18th for the defense of Java, they just missed the Battle of Singapore.

=== Battle of Balikpapan ===
On 23 January 1942 Stoové took part in an air-raid against the Japanese navy fleet off Balikpapan in the Makassar Strait. A total of nine Glenn Martin 139 bombers were escorted by 20 Brewster Buffaloes from 1-VLG-V and 2-VLG-V, each carrying two 110 lb (50 kg) bombs. The Brewsters managed eight hits on four Japanese ships. During the bombing, Stoové's wingman, Ensign Robert Adolf Rothkrans was shot down and killed. Stoové was awarded the Vliegerkruis.

=== Battle of Java ===
On 1 March 1942, when Captain van Helsdingen decided to attack Japanese infantry landing on the beach of Eretan Wetan (now part of Indramayu Regency), he chose Stoové as his wingman. Around 05:30 am, seven Brewster Buffaloes (five from 1-VLG-V and two from 2-VLG-V) started their engines. An eighth aircraft (from 2-VLG-V) could not participate because the engine had caught on fire during a test-run. The participating pilots from 1-VLG-V were; Captain van Rest, 1st Lieutenant Tideman, 1st Lieutenant Benjamins, Sargeants Adam and van Kempen. While under heavy enemy fire the pilots dropped their bombs on several Japanese battle ships and shot at the landing craft during three runs. Van Rest's aircraft (B-3131) was hit multiple times and after returning to base had to remain on the ground. In almost the same garrison as the first attack (except for Captain van Rest and Sargeant van Kempen who was replaced with Sargeant Compaan) the Brewsters took off for a second attack at 07:45 am. During this run 1st Lieutenant Benjamins and Sargeant Stoové were instructed to shoot at Japanese infantry landing on the beach. On his way back to base Stoové had to deal with engine problems but returned safely.

=== Prisoner of war ===
After the capitulation of the Dutch East Indies on 8 March 1942, Stoové was imprisoned in several Japanese POW camps. His longest stay was in a POW camp on the island of Flores, where he and fellow prisoners were forced to build landing strips for the Japanese Air Force.

== After the War ==
=== Emigration ===
After the war had ended, Stoové was liberated from the Japanese POW camp on Flores, and served out his army contract until January 1947. When the Netherlands gave up the Dutch East Indies in 1949, and it became Indonesia, it became dangerous for citizens of European descent, in particular ex-military and indigenous civilians who had served the Dutch. After Stoové heard from a friend that people were looking for him, he decided to leave. In 1954, Stoové together with his wife, Janet Edith van Handenhove, emigrated to the Netherlands. Starting on 12 May, they sailed for three weeks on the MS Willem Ruys from Yogyakarta to Rotterdam. After a short time in pensions they settled in Bloemendaal.

=== Back in service ===
Stoové heard from an old friend from the Dutch East Indies that the Royal Netherlands Air Force were looking for ex-pilots from the ML-KNIL to fill jobs in the Royal Netherlands Air Force. He was accepted and was stationed at Soesterberg airfield flying for the 334th Squadron, so the family moved to Delft. Stoové transported goods and personnel of the Royal Netherlands Air Force, and goods and members of the Royal Dutch Family. At the end of 1975 Stoové, aged 55, retired with a pension. After this he worked for 15 years in an Opel garage as a mechanic. He died in a nursing home in Delft, Netherlands, on 23 September 2010. He was 89 years old.

== Awards ==
- Airman's Cross (Vliegerkruis)
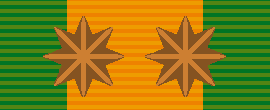
- War Commemorative Cross (Oorlogsherinneringskruis) with Oorlogsvluchten 1940-1945 and Nederlands-Indië 1941-1942 clasps
- Decoration for Order and Peace (Ereteken voor Orde en Vrede)
- New Guinea Commemorative Cross (Nieuw-Guinea Herinneringskruis)
