= Osamu Kudō =

Japanese Navy fighter pilot and flying ace (1913–1942)

- 工藤 修
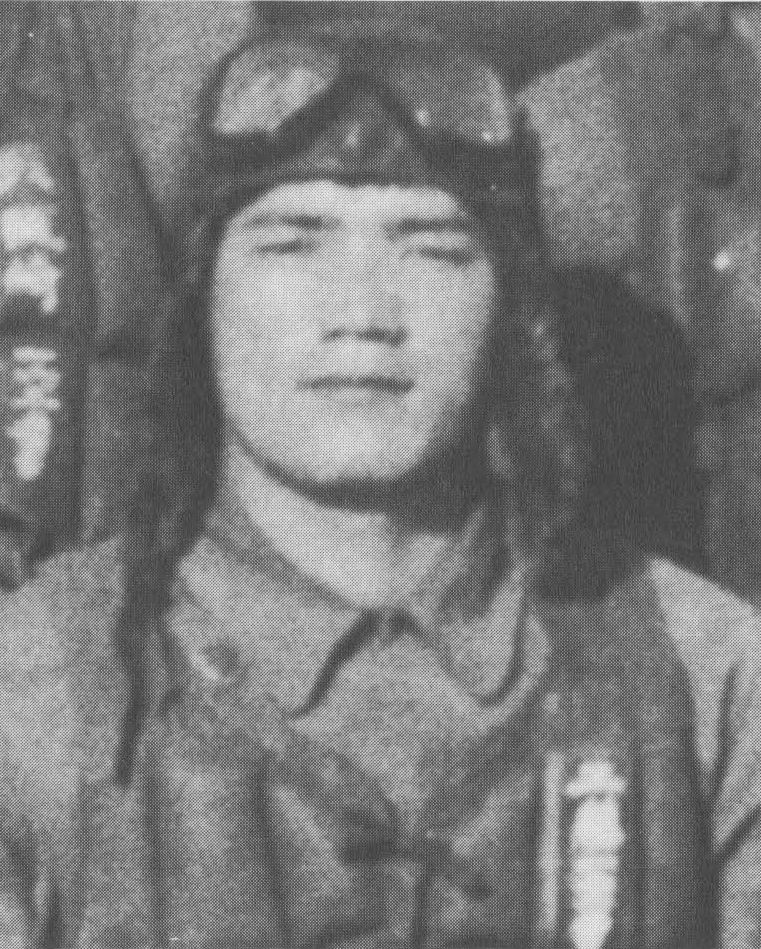
- Kudō in 1938 or 1939 while serving on the aircraft carrier Kaga
- Born: 1915; Ōita Prefecture, Japan
- Died: 3 March 1942 (aged 26–27); Broome, Western Australia
- Military career
- Allegiance: Empire of Japan
- Branch: Imperial Japanese Navy Air Service (IJN)
- Service years: 1931–1942
- Rank: Lieutenant Junior Grade
- Conflicts: Second Sino-Japanese War; World War II; Pacific War

Osamu Kudō (工藤 修, Kudō Osamu; 1915 – 3 March 1942) was an officer and ace fighter pilot in the Imperial Japanese Navy (IJN) during the Second Sino-Japanese War and the Pacific theater of World War II. In aerial combat over China and the Pacific, he was officially credited with destroying seven enemy aircraft. Kudō was killed in action while participating in an air attack on Broome, Australia on 3 March 1942. He was shot down by ML-KNIL Lieutenant Gus Winckel, who had dismounted the 7.99mm machine gun from his Lockheed Lodestar and balanced it on his shoulder while firing.
