= Attack on Broome =

1942 aerial bombing of Broome, Australia by the Japanese during World War II

- Part of World War II, Pacific War
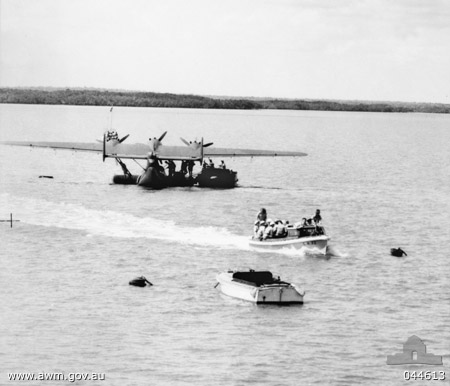
- Personnel from a Royal Netherlands Navy Air Service Dornier Do 24 are transported by launch in Darwin Harbour, May 1941, several months before the attack on Broome
Date	3 March 1942
Location	Roebuck Bay, Broome, Australia 17.962°S 122.236°E
Result	Japanese victory

Belligerents
Australia; Netherlands; United States; United Kingdom	Empire of Japan

Commanders and leaders
(Australia) Clifford Gibson	(Empire of Japan) Zenjiro Miyano

Strength
22 aircraft	10 aircraft

Casualties and losses
88 killed (official toll); 22 aircraft destroyed	1 killed (official toll); 2 aircraft destroyed
- Location within Australia

The town of Broome, Western Australia, was attacked by Japanese fighter planes on 3 March 1942, during World War II. At least 88 civilians and Allied military personnel were killed.

Although Broome was a small pearling port at the time, it was also a refuelling point for aircraft, on the route between the Netherlands East Indies and major Australian cities. As a result, Broome was on a line of flight for Dutch and other refugees, following the Japanese invasion of Java, and had become a significant Allied military base. During a two-week period in February–March 1942, more than a thousand refugees from the Dutch East Indies—many of them in flying boats, which often served as airliners at the time—passed through Broome.

The number of refugees has previously been given as 8,000, but later research by Tom Lewis contends that this figure is massively overstated. The figure was first quoted in the relevant Australian Official War History and has been reproduced in many publications since. The actual number of aerial evacuees passing through Broome at this time is estimated to have been 1,350, mostly military personnel. There were approximately 250 Dutch civilian refugees, most of whom were family members of Dutch aircrews.

== The attack ==
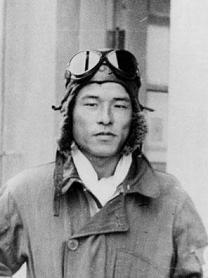
Lt Zenjiro Miyano

Lt Zenjiro Miyano—the commander of Dai 3 Kōkūtai (3rd Air Group) of the Imperial Japanese Navy Air Service—led nine Mitsubishi A6M2 Zero fighters and a Mitsubishi C5M2 reconnaissance plane from their base at Kupang, Timor in the attack, on the morning of 3 March.

From about 09:20, the Zeros made strafing attacks on the flying boat anchorage at Roebuck Bay and the Royal Australian Air Force (RAAF) base at Broome Airfield. No bombs were dropped, although some were reported, perhaps a result of witnesses seeing the Zero pilots releasing their drop tanks. The raid lasted an hour.

The Japanese fighters destroyed at least 22 Allied aircraft. These included an airborne United States Army Air Forces (USAAF) B-24A Liberator full of wounded personnel—nearly 20 died when it crashed in the sea, about 16 km (8.6 nmi; 9.9 mi) off Broome. The Allies also lost 15 flying boats at anchorage; many Dutch refugees were on board and the exact number and identities of all those killed is unknown, but the ages and names of some were recorded when they were moved from Broome to the Perth War Cemetery at Karrakatta in 1950 (the known casualties include nine children, aged from one-year-old). At the airfield, the Japanese fighters destroyed two USAAF B-17E Flying Fortresses, a USAAF B-24, two RAAF Lockheed Hudsons, and a Royal Netherlands East Indies Air Force (ML-KNIL) Lockheed Lodestar.

The aircraft destroyed included: eight PBY Catalina flying boats operated by the Royal Australian Air Force, the Royal Netherlands Navy Air Service (MLD), United States Navy and the Royal Air Force; two Short Empires belonging to the RAAF and Qantas, and five MLD Dornier Do 24s.

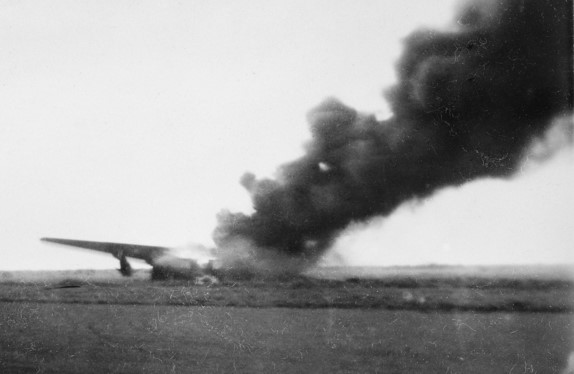
A USAAF B-24 Liberator on fire at Broome Airfield following the attack.

A KLM Douglas DC-3 airliner—PK-AFV (carrying refugees from Bandung)—was pursued and attacked by three Zeroes 80 km (50 mi) north of Broome. The aircraft managed to limp on to perform a successful landing on a beach near Broome, but was then strafed, causing the loss of four lives. A package of diamonds worth £150,000 – 300,000 (now approximately A$20–40 million) were also lost after the downing.

There were no Allied fighter planes based in Broome at the time. The Zeroes encountered some light arms fire from the ground. One Zero pilot—Warrant Officer Osamu Kudō—was killed by ground fire from a Dutch ML-KNIL pilot, First Lieutenant Gus Winckel, using a 7.9-millimetre (0.31 in) machine gun he had removed from his Lodestar. Winckel balanced the weapon on his shoulder and sustained burns to his left forearm when it touched the barrel of the gun after firing. Another Zero ran out of fuel and ditched while returning to base, although the pilot survived.

In 2010, new research found that Kudo's Zero had been shot down by the tail guns in the B-24A Arabian Knight, which itself was shot down by Kudo's attack with the loss of 19 of the 20 American military personnel on board.

== Aftermath ==
When later describing the attack, P/O Frank Russell (RAAF), who had been on one of the flying boats in Roebuck Bay during the raid – stated that he had seen "a scene of ghastly devastation... Our flying boats ... were sending up huge clouds of black smoke. Burning petrol in sinister patches floated all over the sea... All around us, there fell a ceaseless stream of tracer bullets. Several of the Dutch Dorniers had been full of women and kids, waiting to take off to ... safety."

Charlie D'Antoine—an Aboriginal flying boat refueller—helped two passengers from the planes to reach the shore, swimming through burning fuel and wreckage. D'Antoine later received a bravery award from the Dutch government and was invited to attend a royal reception in the Netherlands.

At least one U.S. serviceman—Sgt. Melvin Donoho—managed to swim about 16 km (9.9 mi) from the crashed B-24 to shore, a journey which took him more than 36 hours. Some accounts say that a Sgt. Willard J. Beatty also made it ashore but died soon afterwards; other sources suggest that this was a false report, emanating from one newspaper article.

Japanese aircraft later made several smaller attacks on the Broome area. On 20 March, Mitsubishi G4M2 "Betty" medium bombers made a high-altitude attack on the airfield. One civilian was killed and there was some crater damage. The last attack was in August 1943.

== Postscript ==
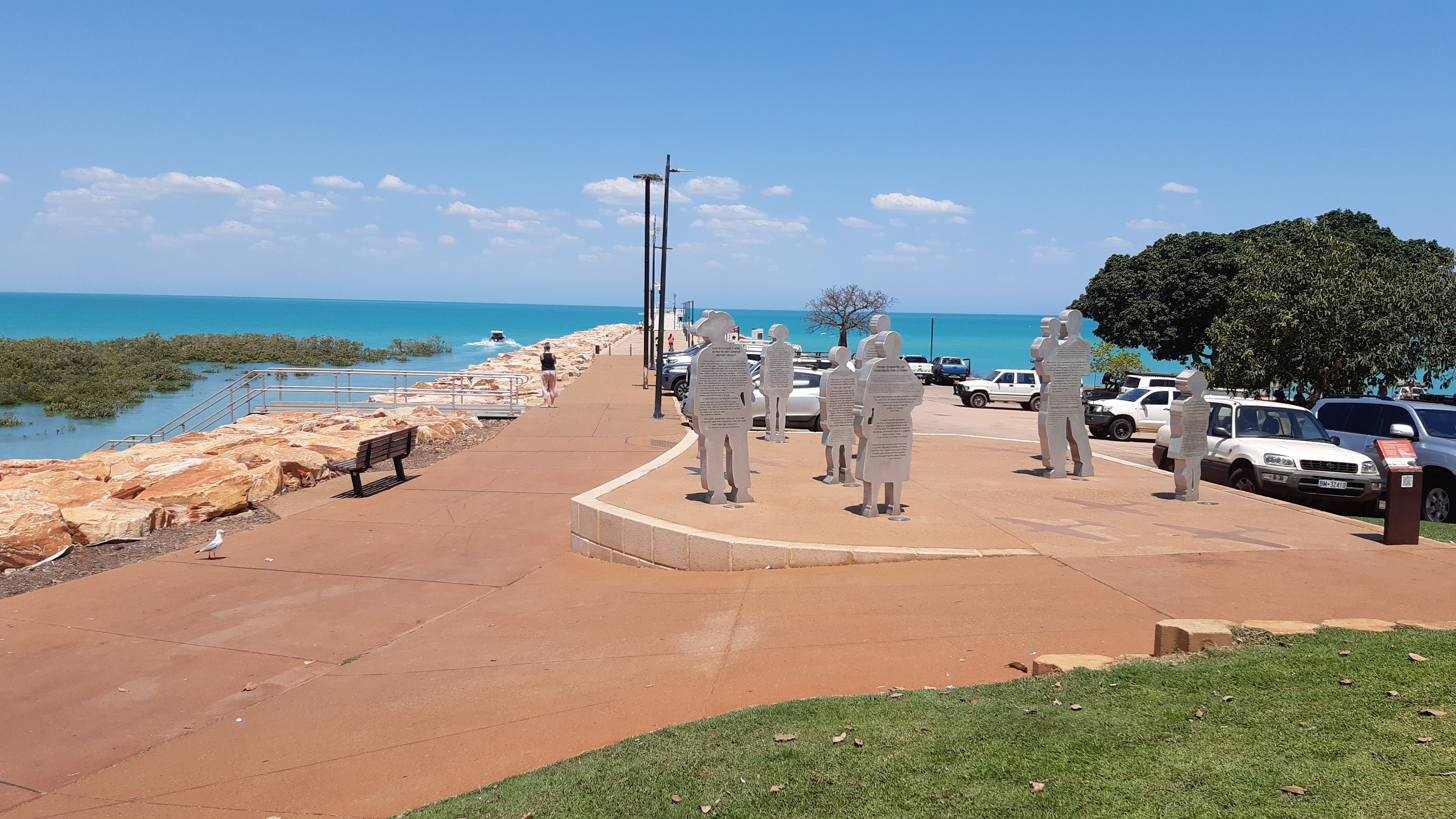
9 Zeros 9 Stories, a war memorial at Town Beach, Broome commemorating those killed in the attack

Australian author Coralie Clarke Rees published a less prosaic, and highly personal account of the Broome air raid in her 1946 elegy to her dead airman brother, Silent His Wings:

You in a tiny hand-picked bunch of sappers
chosen to gelignite Broome in the teeth
of the down-swooping Jap, saw stately Dutch flying-boats,
lovely Dutch women, riddled with bullets, blasted, floating,
American Liberators and quaking Malays spine-shattered
by the hail of yellow bombs. You smelt and tasted death
and the tang of it never left your tongue.

For outstanding work for Netherlands forces and civilians in very trying circumstances, Lieutenant David Llewellyn Davis, RANVR, was awarded the Cross of Merit (Netherlands): Lieutenant Davis, as deputy Naval Officer in charge of Broome, Port Hedland district during an enemy attack on the Netherlands navy planes at Broome on 3 March 1942, showed conspicuous organising ability, handled transport in a masterly manner and rendered great assistance to those aboard this plane.

On Anzac Day 2000 the Allied War Memorial was dedicated in the city of Broome acknowledging the British, American and Dutch servicemen and civilians who were killed

Over the years, wrecks of flying boats become visible at very low tides, with tour guides and sightseers visitations. Shipwrecks are protected by state law and may not be touched, but part of the fuselage of a Catalina flying boat is believed to have been stolen by November 2020. The RSL said that the wrecks near Broome were war graves and needed more protection.

In 2021 amateur historians and the Maritime Archaeological Association were diving and making a database of wrecks around the state. All the flying boats attacked in the water caught fire and burnt down to the waterline, so not much full structure is left.

== See also ==
- Battle for Australia
- Western Australian emergency of March 1942

== Sources ==
- Lewis, Dr Tom & Ingman, Peter. (2010). Zero Hour in Broome. Avonmore Books: Adelaide. ISBN 9780957735156.
- Prime, Mervyn W. (1992). Broome's One Day War: The Story of the Japanese Raid on Broome, 3 March 1942, Broome: Shire of Broome (for Broome Historical Society). OCLC 221312377
- Prime, Mervyn W. (n.d.). WA's Pearl Harbour – The Japanese Raid on Broome, Bull Creek, WA (Royal Australian Air Force Association Aviation Museum). OCLC 219836510
