= August Deibel =

Pilot of the Royal Netherlands East Indies

August Gerard Deibel
- Born: 11 September 1915; Fort de Kock, Sumatra
- Died: 12 June 1951 (aged 35); Uithuizen, Netherlands
- Military career
- Allegiance: Netherlands
- Service years: ? – 1951
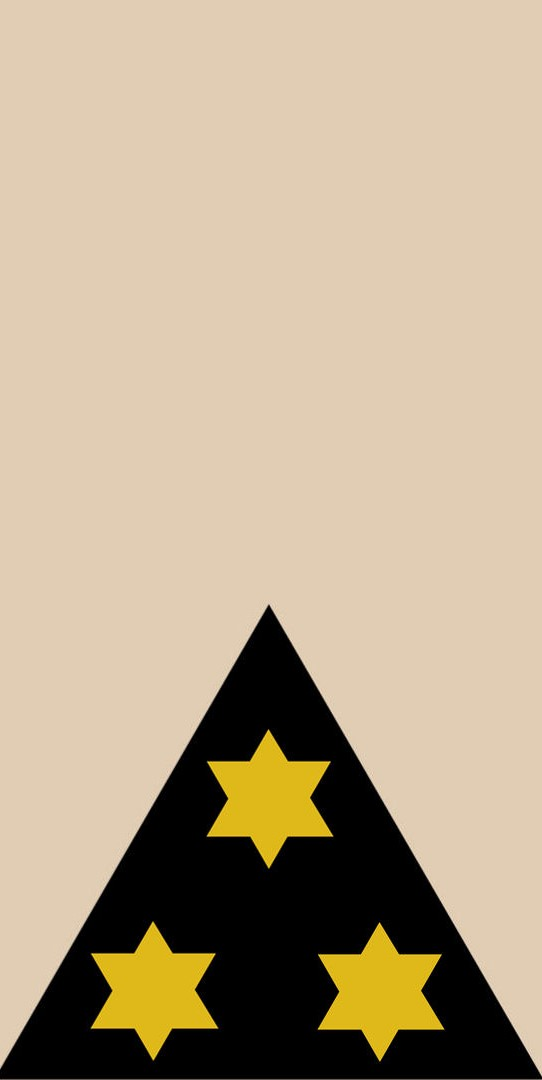
- Rank: Captain
- Unit: 2-VLG-V
- Conflicts: World War II; Battle of Malaya; Dutch East Indies campaign
- Awards: Military William Order

1st Lieutenant August Gerard Deibel (11 September 1915 – 12 June 1951) was a Dutch pilot of the Royal Netherlands East Indies Army Air Force. He was part of 2-VLG-V, which was stationed in Singapore before its withdrawal to Java. His unit emblem was a rhinoceros head painted on both sides of the front fuselage on his Brewster Buffalo aircraft. His rank and surname, 'Lt Deibel' was printed beside the nose art.

Deibel is credited with three kills, two of which were Ki-27 Nates on 12 January, during a Japanese air raid over Singapore, and was twice wounded in action on 12 January and 19 February 1942. Deibel was killed on 12 June 1951, piloting a Gloster Meteor aircraft when it crashed near Uithuizen in the Netherlands.

== World War II ==
=== Singapore ===
Deibel arrived in Singapore with his squadron on 9 December 1941 with 9-12 Brewster Buffaloes and was stationed at Kallang Airfield.

He first saw action on 12 January 1942 during a Japanese air raid over Singapore. A formation of Japanese bombers escorted by five Ki-27 Nates were sighted at 1000 hours. They were intercepted by three Dutch Buffaloes, who succeeded in chasing them away, damaging one of the bombers. When they returned in the afternoon, Deibel and two other pilots were scrambled to intercept them, encountering nine Ki-27s. Deibel claimed two of them before being shot down himself. He was hospitalised for four days after suffering a wounded head.

His squadron returned to Java on 18 January, missing out on the Battle of Singapore. Deibel followed eight Buffaloes to Semplak, while 23 others flew to Andir and Tjilitian.

=== Dutch East Indies ===
When a formation of 35 Japanese aircraft attacked Semplak on 19 February, eight Buffaloes (including Deibel) engaged them. Deibel managed to fire twice at an A6M Zero, but was wounded by a 20 mm shell ten minutes later, forcing him to land. 11 Japanese planes were shot down, with the Dutch losing four Buffaloes and two pilots. The raid destroyed three RAF Lockheed Hudsons and two KNILM Sikorskys.

On 7 March, Japanese troops had reached the plateau of Lembang. Deibel, along with Lieutenant Gerard Bruggink and Officer Cadet Jan Scheffer, volunteered to join Captain Jacob van Helsdingen on his mission using the last three working Buffalo aircraft. The four pilots took off from Andir airfield and proceeded to Lembang to provide air support for ground troops fighting in the city.

Van Helsdingen's squadron travelled 200 metres when they encountered a Japanese aircraft, which Deibel attacked before it escaped. Some time later, three Japanese A6M Zeros appeared. Deibel fired at two of them which turned away, but was hit in the oil tank by the third Zero and had to break off from combat. His wingman, Scheffer, escorted him back to Andir airfield under a tropical rainstorm, shooting down a Nakajima Ki-43 fighter. One of Deibel's landing gears, damaged during the fight, broke off from his aircraft, causing it to crash in a ground loop. He survived without sustaining any injuries. Van Helsdingen and Bruggink remained above Lembang, but were now dogfighting six Zeroes. Van Helsdingen was soon shot down, but Bruggink managed to escape into the clouds before returning to Andir airfield. Dutch forces in Lembang surrendered the next day. All four Dutch pilots were awarded the Military William Order on 14 July 1948.

== Military decorations ==
- Knight fourth class of the Military Order of William
- Resistance Star East Asia

== See also ==
- Jacob van Helsdingen
- Gerard Bruggink
