= Jan Hilgers =

Dutch aviator

Johan Willem Emile Louis Hilgers
- Born: 19 December 1886; Probolinggo, East Java, Netherlands Indies (now Indonesia)
- Died: 21 July 1945 (aged 58); Japanese prison camp Ngawi
- Cause of death: exhaustion
- Occupations: pilot, Aviation pioneer, Aircraft mechanic and engineer.
- Employer(s): Verwey & Lugard, Fokker, Royal Netherlands East Indies Army Air Force
- Known for: Piloting the first flight in the Netherlands
- Spouse: Anna Sophia Blijenburg
- Children: 6

Johan Willem Emile Louis Hilgers (19 December 1886 – 21 July 1945), more commonly known as Jan Hilgers or John Hilgers, was an Indo (Eurasian) aviator and one of the leading pioneers of Dutch aviation. He was the first Dutch pilot to complete a flight in Dutch airspace 29 July 1910. For the official memorial of this in 1955 a monument was erected in the town of Ede, also a road, the "Jan Hilgersweg" was named after him.

In the Dutch East Indies alone Hilgers made at least 8,000 take offs. Throughout his career as aviator he survived at least 20 crashes without ever breaking a bone.

== Life ==
As it was impossible for Indos in colonial history to attain the necessary education in the Dutch East Indies (now: Indonesia) required to maximize career opportunities, Indo-European families that could afford it would send their children to schools and universities in the Netherlands. At age 11 Hilgers was sent to the Netherlands. When Hilgers studied at a technical school for mechanics in Amsterdam, his hobby was already building model airplanes. After completing his education in 1908 he went on to work in electricity plants in Nijmegen. As of 1909 he enthusiastically started building his own experimental gliders.

Employed as production manager by the firm Verwey & Lugard, one of the first aerospace companies in the Netherlands, he had access to a Blériot XI airplane and was responsible for building up the company’s facilities at the Dutch airfields of Ede and Soesterberg.

In 1910 his firm hurried him home from training camp in France to ensure they beat the pilot Clément Van Maasdijk, who had just received his flight certification (1 July 1910) and was commissioned by another organization to fly the first airplane in Dutch airspace. Although Hilgers had only just learned to fly and had not completed his training, he indeed became the first flying Dutchman to take off and land an airplane in the Netherlands.

In 1911 Hilgers already instructed pilots in his own school for aviation in Soesterberg before obtaining an official license issued by the ENV, (Eerste Nederlandse Vliegvereniging - First Dutch Aviation Organisation) on August 12, 1912.

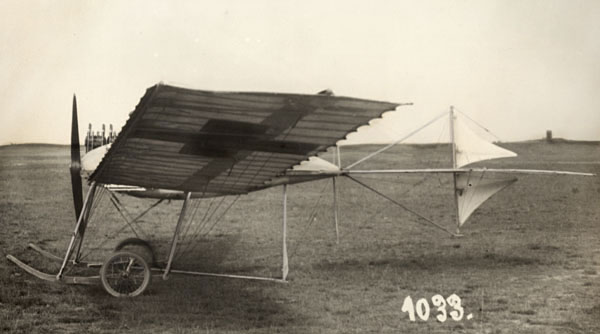
Early Fokker model flown by Hilgers.

In 1912 Hilgers joined another Dutch East Indies born Dutchman and aviation pioneer Anthony Fokker at his newly established company in Germany. In service of aircraft manufacturer Fokker he piloted demonstration flights of the Fokker Spin airplane, designed by Anthony Fokker, in Germany. Later on he also went to Russia for 8 months giving flight demonstrations around the Tsardom.

In 1913 Hilgers went to the Dutch East Indies to give flight demonstrations there. He bought and took along two Fokker monoplanes, one equipped with a 100 pk (73.6 kW) Argus-motor, the other with an 80 pk (58.8 kW) Renault. In his first test flight back in the Indies he also became the first pilot to survive an airplane crash in Indonesia. After a few rounds at an altitude of six hundred meters, the plane suffered a technical malfunction and crashed near Surabaya.

"An Arab warned me not to fly on Bubutan, because of the sacred tombs there. In any case I had to give a slamatan (traditional feast) first, which I did. [...] The take off site struck me as being be too small, as I could only take off in one direction. [...] During my first flight I already crashed into a bamboo forest and wrecked my (first) plane." Hilgers, Batavia, 1920.

Back home in the Dutch East Indies he got married and raised a family. On May 30, 1914, Hilgers was involved with Hein ter Poorten in the founding of the forerunner of the Royal Netherlands East Indies Army Air Force. Until the Japanese invasion of 1942 in World War II he was an engineer and instructor there. Hilgers died in a Japanese prison camp at Ngawi, East-Java on July 21, 1945, just before Japan’s surrender to the Allies.

== Family ==
Married to Anna Sophia Blijenburg te Bangil, East Java, September 27, 1913. They had five daughters named Croon, Fien, Ada, Bea, Laura and a son named Maurits.

== Legacy ==
In Ede the "Jan Hilgersweg" has been named after Jan Hilgers.
