= Fokker DC.I =

DC.I
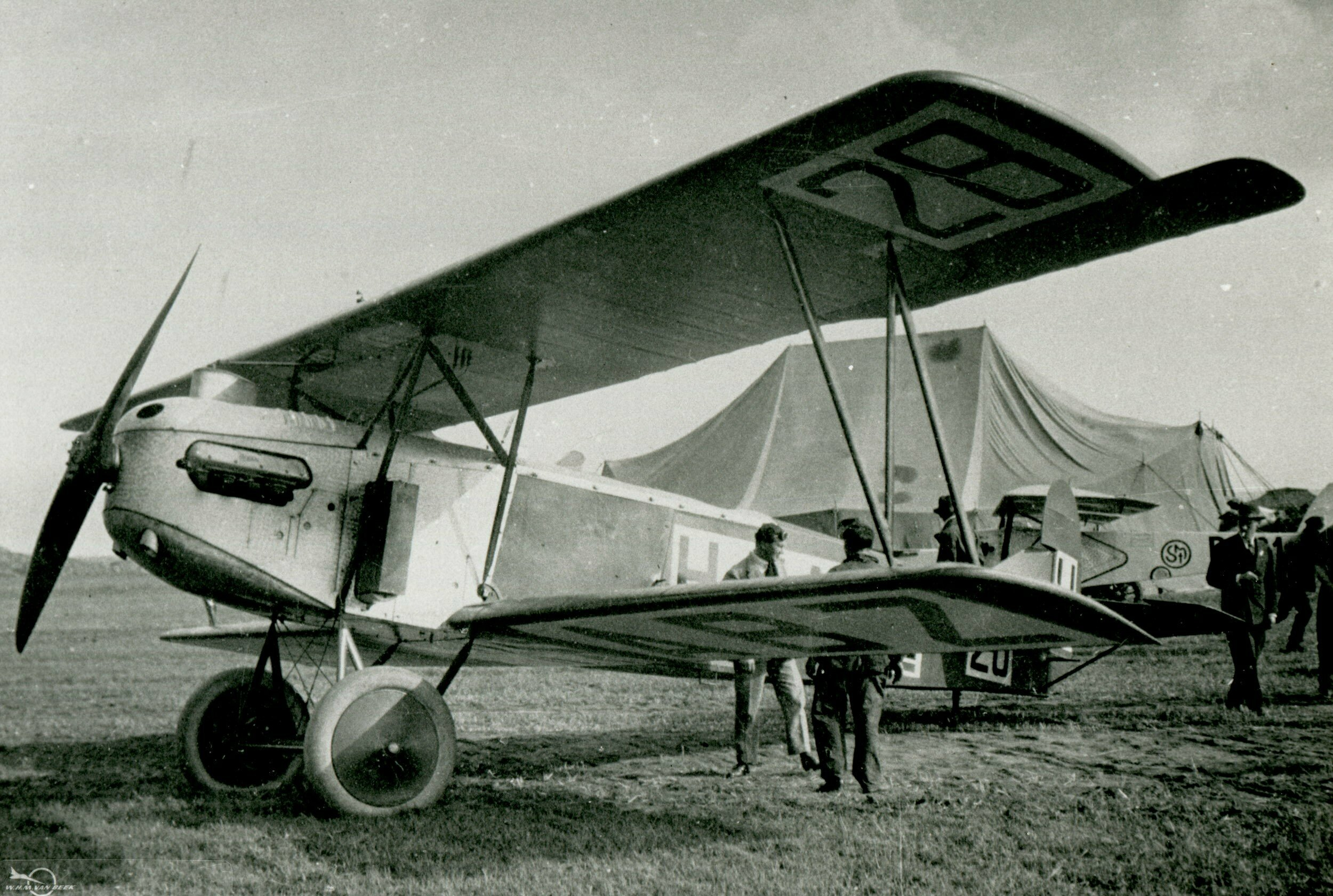

General information
- Type: Fighter and reconnaissance aircraft
- Manufacturer: Fokker
- Designer: Rheinhold Platz
- Primary user: Dutch East Indies Army Air Service
- Number built: 10

History
- First flight: 1923

The Fokker DC.I was an aircraft produced in the Netherlands in the early 1920s to fulfill a role of combined fighter and reconnaissance aircraft. The company designation chosen by Fokker, "DC" reflected this, with "D" being the Idflieg designation for a fighter during World War I, and "C" being an armed reconnaissance aircraft. The DC.I was a conventional single-bay biplane with staggered, unequal-span wings braced by N-struts and was derived from the Fokker C.IV design. The pilot and observer sat in tandem, open cockpits, and the undercarriage was of fixed, tailskid configuration, with the main units linked by a cross-axle. The wings were of wooden construction, and the fuselage was of welded steel tube covered in fabric.

Ten DC.Is were ordered by the Dutch East Indies Army Air Service, which flew them from 1925 to 1934.

== Specifications ==
General characteristics

- Crew: Two - pilot and observer
- Length: 8.85 m (29 ft 1 in)
- Wingspan: 11.75 m (38 ft 7 in)
- Height: 3.40 m (11 ft 2 in)
- Empty weight: 1,400 kg (3,090 lb)
- Gross weight: 1,830 kg (4,030 lb)
- Powerplant: 1 × Napier Lion , 340 kW (450 hp)

Performance

- Maximum speed: 245 km/h (152 mph, 132 kn)
- Endurance: 3 hours
- Service ceiling: 8,000 m (26,250 ft)

Armament

- 2 × fixed, forward-firing 7.7 mm (.303 in) machine guns in forward fuselage
- 1 × trainable, rearward-firing 7.7 mm (.303 in) machine gun for observer
