= Malayan campaign =

1941–1942 World War II military campaign

- Part of the Pacific Theatre of World War II
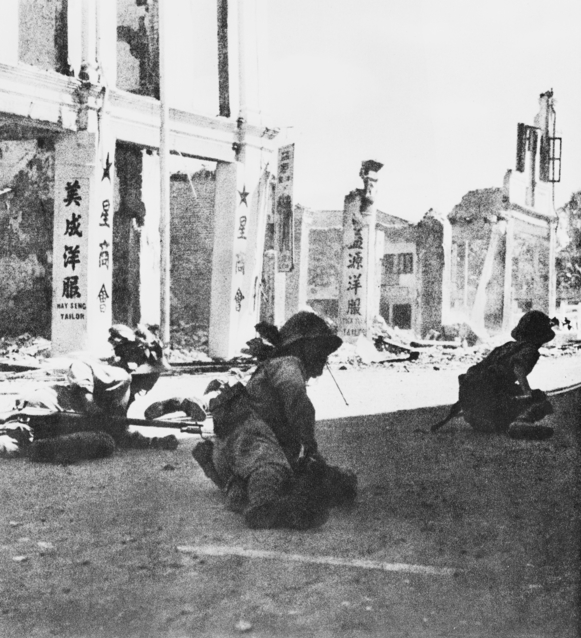
- Troops of the Imperial Japanese Army crouch on a street in Johor Bahru in the final stages of the Malayan campaign
Date	8 December 1941 – 15 February 1942 (2 months, and 8 days)
Location	Malaya
Result	Japanese victory
Territorial changes	Japanese occupation of Malaya

Belligerents
British Empire: United Kingdom; India; Federated Malay States; Straits Settlements; Australia; New Zealand; Netherlands: (Netherlands) Dutch East Indies; Kuomintang of Malaya; Communist Party of Malaya	Japan; Thailand Kesatuan Melayu Muda

Commanders and leaders
Archibald Wavell; Robert Brooke-Popham; Arthur Percival (surrendered); Lewis Heath (surrendered); David Murray-Lyon (surrendered); Archibald Paris †; Arthur Barstow †; Gordon Bennett Tom Phillips † Conway Pulford † Leong Yew Koh; Lai Teck	Hisaichi Terauchi; Tomoyuki Yamashita; Takuro Matsui; Takuma Nishimura; Renya Mutaguchi; Michio Sugawara; Plaek Phibunsongkhram Nobutake Kondō; Jisaburō Ozawa; Shintarō Hashimoto Ibrahim Yaacob

Units involved
Far East Command (Note: until 7 January 1942) ABDA Command (Note: from 7 January 1942); Malaya Command; III Corps; 9th Division; 11th Division; 8th Division; 53rd Brigade; Malay Regiment; SSVF; (United Kingdom) RAF Far East; (United Kingdom) RAF (8 SQNs); (Australia) RAAF (4 SQNs); RNZAF (1 SQN); ML-KNIL: East Indies Fleet; Force Z; OCAJA; MPAJA	Imperial Japanese Army; South Expeditionary Army; 25th Army; Imperial Guards; 5th Division; 18th Division; 3rd Tank Brigade; 56th Division; 3rd Air Corps; 3 Sentai/5th Air Corps; 2nd Fleet; Distant Cover Force; Closed Cover Force; Invasion Force; 22nd Air Flotilla; Royal Thai Police; Young Malays Union

Strength
130,246 troops 253 aircraft 810 artillery pieces 208+ anti-tank and anti-aircraft guns 54 fortress guns (Note: Between Singapore and Malaya, the Japanese captured 300 field guns, 180 mortars/howitzers, 100 anti-aircraft guns, 54 fortress guns, 108 1-pounder guns (likely a typo meant to say 2-pounder), and, on the mainland, another 330 guns of unspecified type. Kevin Blackburn, Karl Hack. "Did Singapore Have to Fall?: Churchill and the Impregnable Fortress". Routledge. 1 November 2003. Page 193 gives a total of 225 25-pounders and 18-pounders for the campaign, but this number excludes 4.5-inch and 3.7-inch howitzers and 75mm field guns, as well as fortress guns. Page 74 gives a total of 226 for British artillery pieces during the siege of Singapore itself, including fortress guns (172 without them).); 250+ AFVs (Note: 50 armoured vehicles were captured on Malaya and 200 on Singapore, mostly Universal Carriers and armoured cars; includes 23 Mark VI light tanks.); 15,400+ motor vehicles (Note: 1,800 trucks and 13,600 cars and other vehicles were lost to the Japanese on both Singapore and the mainland.)	125,408 troops 799 aircraft 440+ artillery pieces 265 tanks 3,000+ trucks

Casualties and losses
130,246–138,708 casualties 7,500–8,000 killed 10,000–11,000+ wounded ~120,000+ captured or missing 440~ aircraft destroyed	9,657–14,768 casualties 3,507–5,240 killed 6,150–9,528 wounded >30 tanks destroyed 331 aircraft lost (92 in combat); 108–331 aircraft damaged or destroyed
- 20,000 to 83,000 civilians killed

The Malayan campaign, referred to by Japanese sources as the Malay Operation (馬来作戦, Maree Sakusen), was a military campaign fought by Allied and Axis forces in Malaya from 8 December 1941 – 15 February 1942 at the opening of the Pacific War and during the Second World War. It was dominated by land battles between British Commonwealth army units and the Imperial Japanese Army, with minor skirmishes at the beginning of the campaign between British Commonwealth and Royal Thai Police. The Japanese had air and naval supremacy from the opening days of the campaign. For the British, Indian, Australian, and Malayan forces defending the colony, the campaign was a total disaster.

The operation is notable for the Japanese use of bicycle infantry, which supposedly allowed troops to carry more equipment and swiftly move through thick jungle terrain. Royal Engineers, equipped with demolition charges, destroyed over a hundred bridges during the retreat, yet this did little to delay the Japanese. Japanese air supremacy, infiltration tactics, superior leadership, and experienced infantry units ensured an overwhelming victory over the unorganized Allied forces.

By the time the Japanese 25th Army had captured Singapore, they had suffered between 9,657 and 14,768 casualties. Allied losses were much heavier at 130,246 to 138,708, including around 7,500 to 8,000 killed, 10,000 to 11,000+ wounded and 120,000+ missing or captured. Between 20,000 and 83,000 civilians were killed in the campaign, mostly victims of the Sook Ching Massacre.

== Background ==
=== Japanese ===
By 1941 the Japanese had been engaged for four years in trying to subjugate China. They were heavily reliant on imported materials for their military forces, particularly oil from the United States. From 1940 to 1941, following the Japanese takeover of French colonies the United States, the United Kingdom, and the Netherlands imposed embargoes on supplying oil and war materials to Japan. The object of the embargoes was to assist the Chinese and encourage the Japanese to halt military action in China. The Japanese considered that pulling out of China would result in a loss of face and decided instead to take military action against US, British and Dutch territories in South East Asia. The Japanese forces for the invasion were assembled in 1941 on Hainan Island and in French Indochina. This troop build-up was noticed by the Allies and, when asked, the Japanese advised that it related to its operations in China.

When the Japanese invaded, they had over 200 tanks, consisting of the Type 95 Ha-Go light tank, Type 97 Chi-Ha and Type 89 I-Go medium tanks and Type 97 Te-Ke tankettes. In support they had nearly 800 aircraft available. Commonwealth troops were equipped with the Manchester 6×4 Armoured Car, Marmon-Herrington Armoured Car, Universal Carrier and only 23 obsolete Mk VIB light tanks (in the 100th Light Tank Squadron of the Indian Army), none of which were sufficiently armed for armoured warfare. They had just over 250 combat aircraft; half of these would be lost in the first few days of combat.

When the Japanese invaded Malaya it was part of expansive attack all across the Pacific and South East Asia, stretching from Pearl Harbor and islands in the Pacific, the Philippines, Hong Kong, Burma, Singapore, Borneo, and Thailand.

=== Commonwealth ===
Between the wars, the British military strategy in the Far East was undermined by a lack of attention and funding. In 1937, Major-General William Dobbie, General Officer Commanding (GOC) Malaya (1935–39), looked at Malaya's defences and reported that during the monsoon season, from October to March, landings could be made by an enemy on the east coast and bases could be established in Siam (Thailand). He predicted that landings could be made at Songkhla and Pattani in Siam, and Kota Bharu in Malaya. He recommended large reinforcements to be sent immediately. His predictions turned out to be correct, but his recommendations were ignored. The British government's plans relied primarily on the stationing of a strong fleet at the Singapore Naval Base in the event of any enemy hostility, in order to defend both Britain's Far Eastern possessions and the route to Australia. A strong naval presence was also thought to act as a deterrent against possible aggressors.

By 1940, however, the army commander in Malaya, Lieutenant-General Lionel Bond, conceded that a successful defence of Singapore demanded the defence of the whole peninsula, and that the naval base alone would not be sufficient to deter a Japanese invasion. Military planners concluded that the desired Malayan air force strength would be 300–500 aircraft, but this was never reached because of the higher priorities in the allocation of men and material for Britain and the Middle East.

The defence strategy for Malaya rested on two basic assumptions: first, that there would be sufficient early warning of an attack to allow for reinforcement of British troops, and second, that American help was at hand in case of attack. By late 1941, after Lieutenant-General Arthur E. Percival had taken over as GOC Malaya, it became clear that neither of these assumptions had any real substance. In addition, Churchill and Roosevelt had agreed that in the event of war breaking out in South East Asia, priority would be given to finishing the war in Europe. The east, until that time, would be a secondary priority. Containment was considered the primary strategy in the east.

=== Intelligence operations ===
Planning for this offensive was undertaken by the Japanese Military Affairs Bureau's Unit 82 based in Taiwan. Intelligence on Malaya was gathered through a network of agents which included Japanese embassy staff; disaffected Malayans (particularly members of the Japanese-established Tortoise Society); and Japanese, Korean, and Taiwanese business people and tourists. Japanese spies, which included a British intelligence officer, Captain Patrick Stanley Vaughan Heenan, also provided intelligence and assistance.

Prior to hostilities Japanese intelligence officers like Iwaichi Fujiwara had established covert intelligence offices (or Kikans) that linked up with the Malay and Indian pro-independence organisations such as Kesatuan Melayu Muda and the Indian Independence League. The Japanese gave these movements financial support in return for their members providing intelligence and later assistance in determining Allied troop movements, strengths, and dispositions prior to the invasion.

Through the operation of these networks prior to the invasion the Japanese knew where the Commonwealth forces were based and their unit strengths, had good maps of Malaya, and had local guides available to provide them with directions.

=== November 1941 ===
In November 1941, the British became aware of the large scale buildup of Japanese troops in French Indo-China. Thailand was seen to be under threat from this build-up as well as Malaya. British strategists had foreseen the possibility of Thailand's Kra isthmus being used by the Japanese to invade Malaya. To counteract this potential threat, plans for a pre-emptive invasion of southern Thailand, named Operation Matador, had been drawn up. By the time the invasion became highly likely the British decided not to use them for political reasons.

== Japanese invasion of Malaya ==
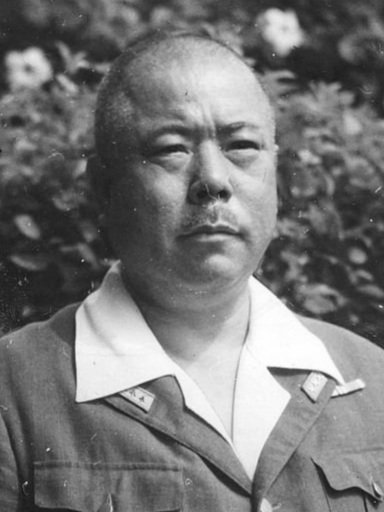
Lt Gen Tomoyuki Yamashita, Commander of the Japanese 25th Army

The Malayan campaign began when the 25th Army, under the command of Lieutenant General Tomoyuki Yamashita, invaded Malaya on 8 December 1941. Japanese troops launched an amphibious assault on the northern coast of Malaya at Kota Bharu and started advancing down the eastern coast of Malaya. The Japanese 5th Division also landed at Pattani and Songkhla in Thailand, then moved south into western Malaya. French Indo-China was still under French administration, and had little option but to co-operate with the Japanese. The French authorities therefore submitted to the Japanese military using the territory's ports as naval bases, building air bases, and massing forces there for the invasion. Japan also coerced Thailand into co-operating with the invasion, though Thai troops resisted the landings in Thai territory for eight hours.

At 04:00, 17 Japanese bombers attacked Singapore, the first ever air raid on the colony. It became evident to the British that Japanese bombers based in Indochina were now within range of Singapore.

The Japanese were initially resisted by III Corps of the Indian Army and several British Army battalions. The Japanese quickly isolated individual Indian units defending the coastline, before concentrating their forces to surround the defenders and force their surrender. The Japanese forces held a slight advantage in numbers in northern Malaya and were significantly superior in close air support, armour, co-ordination, tactics, and experience, having fought in the Second Sino-Japanese War. The Allies had no tanks, which had put them at a severe disadvantage. The Japanese also used bicycle infantry and light tanks, which allowed swift movement of their forces overland through terrain covered with thick tropical rainforest, criss-crossed by native paths. Although the Japanese had not brought bicycles with them (to speed the disembarkation process), they knew from their intelligence that suitable machines were plentiful in Malaya and quickly confiscated what they needed from civilians and retailers.

A replacement for Operation Matador, named Operation Krohcol by the British Indian Army, was implemented on 8 December, but the troops were easily defeated by the Royal Thai Police and the Japanese 5th Division. Force Z of the Royal Navy (battleship HMS Prince of Wales, battlecruiser HMS Repulse, and four destroyers, under the command of Admiral Sir Tom Phillips) had arrived right before the outbreak of hostilities. Japanese aircraft based in Indochina sank Prince of Wales and Repulse on 10 December, leaving the east coast of Malaya exposed, allowing the Japanese to continue their invasion.

== Air war ==
=== Background ===
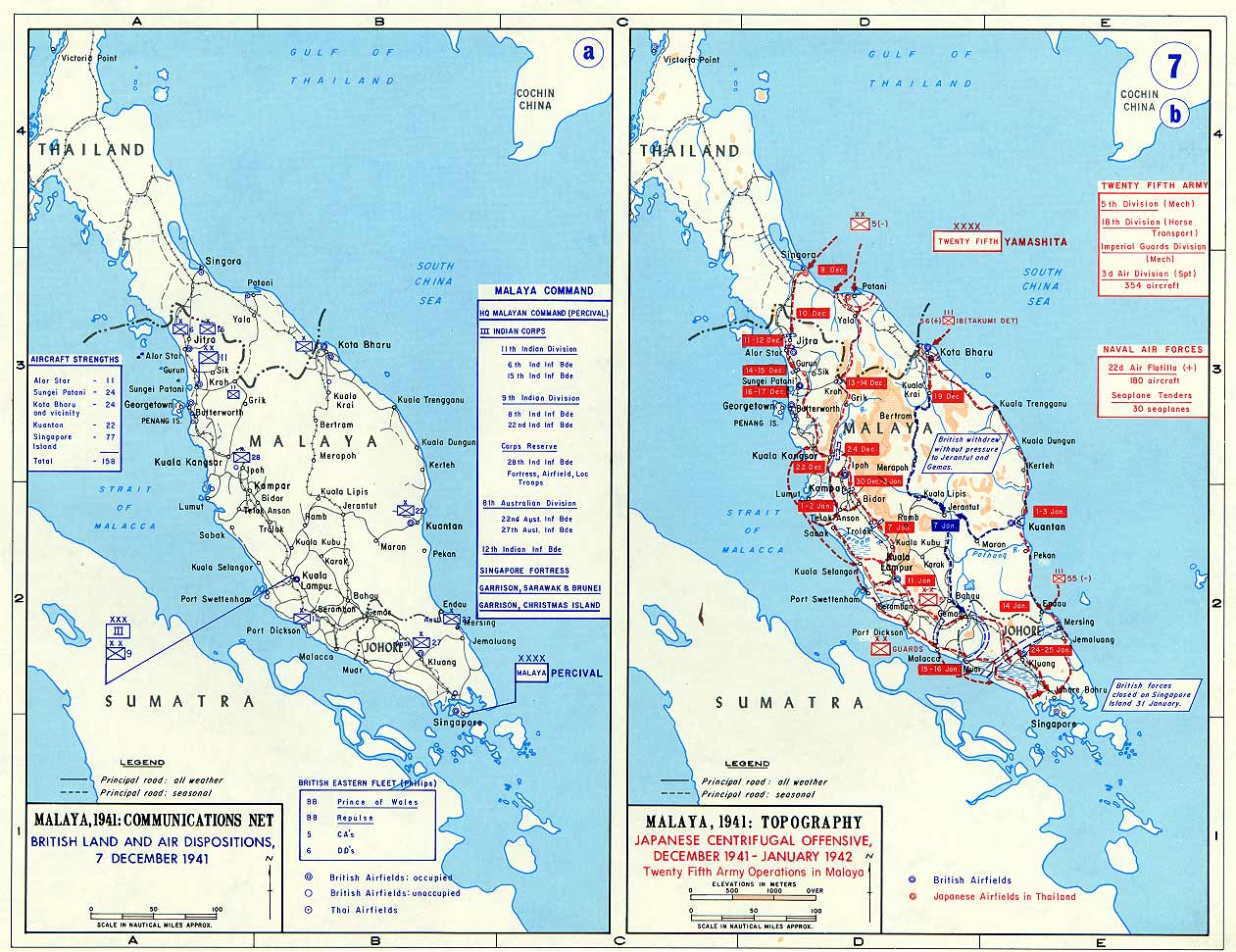
Map of the Malayan campaign

As a lower-priority theatre, the Allies had comparatively few modern aircraft to challenge the Japanese. In addition the Allies did not consider Japanese aircraft a significant threat. In 1941 the Allies assumed that Japan would only have a few hundred poor quality outdated aircraft. The respected Janes All the World's Aircraft for 1941 indicated that the Japanese only had a cluster of dated foreign and indigenous aircraft. Japanese pilots were also underrated, considered unlikely to make particularly good pilots.

Prior to the invasion on 8 December there were 75 Allied aircraft stationed in northern Malaya and 83 in Singapore. The only fighter squadron in northern Malaya was No 21 Squadron RAAF that was equipped with 12 Brewster Buffalos. The Japanese had at least 459 aircraft available.

=== Japanese aircraft and units ===
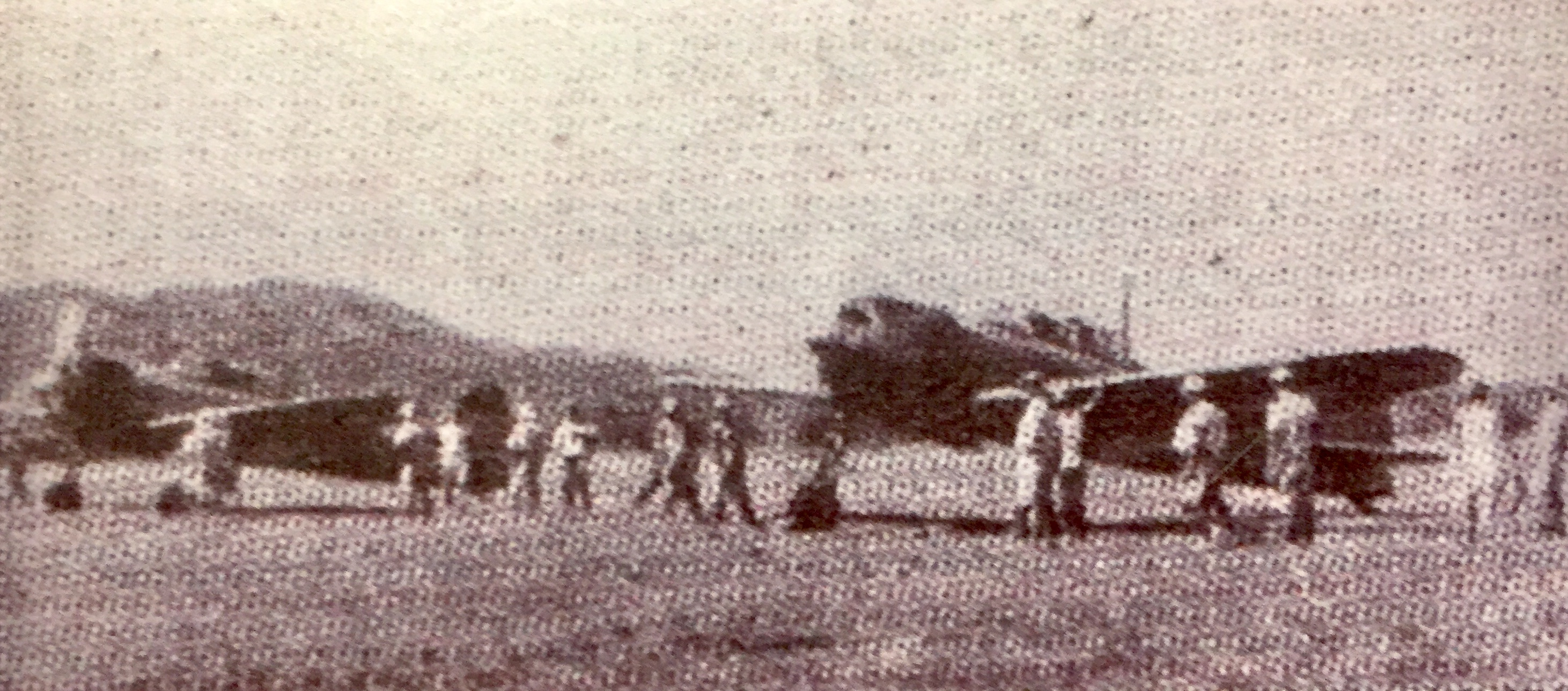
Japanese aircraft at Penang - Summer 1942

The Japanese Navy's 22nd Air Flotilla (22nd Kōkū-Sentai) with 110 aircraft and commanded by Vice Admiral Matsunaga Sadaichi operating out of three air bases near Saigon took part in the initial attacks on Malaya.

The 22nd Air Flotilla included the 22nd (Genzan), Bihoro, and Kanoya Air Groups (or Kōkūtai). They were equipped with 33 Type 96 Mitsubishi G3M1 'Nell' bombers. The Air Flotilla also had 25 Type 96 Mitsubishi A5M4 'Claude' fighters available. The Genzan Air Group was a key participant in the sinking of the British capital ships Prince of Wales and Repulse off the coast of Malaya on 10 December 1941, losing one aircraft and its crew during the battle. On 22 January 1942, bombers from the Genzan Air Group attacked Kallang Airport in Singapore, and subsequently provided air support for Japanese offensives in Malaya including the landings at Endau.

The Japanese 3rd Air Corps (飛行集団, Hikō Shudan) and three Air Combat Groups (飛行戦隊, Hikō Sentai) of the 5th Air Corps took part in the Malaya Campaign. In total there were 354 Imperial Japanese Army Air Service (IJAAS) first line aircraft involved together with the 110 Imperial Japanese Navy Air Service (IJNAS) aircraft. The Army units were variously equipped with fighters: Nakajima Ki-27 Nate, Nakajima Ki-43 Oscar, Mitsubishi Ki-51 Sonia; bombers: Kawasaki Ki-48 Lily, Mitsubishi Ki-21 Sally, Mitsubishi Ki-30 Ann; and reconnaissance: Mitsubishi Ki-15 Babs, Mitsubishi Ki-46 Dinah.

Most Japanese pilots of the IJAAS units and at least a quarter of the IJNAS pilots had combat experience against the Chinese and the Soviets. They were all well trained.

=== Allied aircraft and units ===
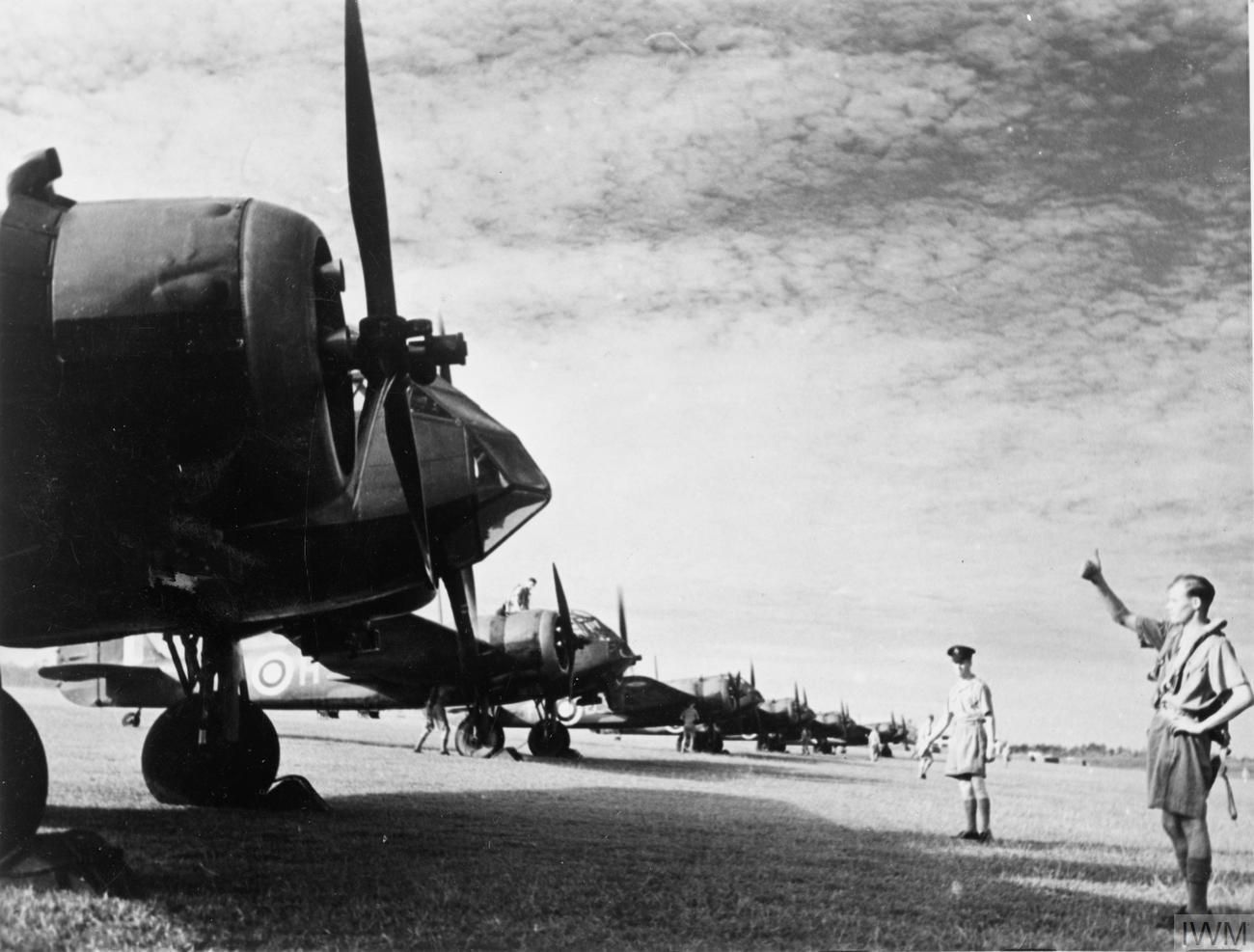
Bristol Blenheim bombers of No. 62 Squadron RAF lined up at RAF Tengah, Singapore, 8 February 1941

Prior to the commencement of hostilities the Allies in Malaya and Singapore had four fighter squadrons: 21 and 453 RAAF, 243 RAF, and 488 RNZAF. They were equipped with the Brewster Buffalo, a plane that aviation historian Dan Ford characterized as pathetic. Its engine had fuel starvation problems and poor supercharger performance at higher altitudes. Maneuverability was poor and the engine tended to overheat in the tropical climate, spraying oil over the windscreen. In service, some effort was made to improve performance by removing the armour plate, armoured windshields, radios, gun camera, and all other unnecessary equipment, and by replacing the .50 in (12.7 mm) machine guns with .303 in (7.7 mm) machine guns. The fuselage tanks were filled with a minimum of fuel and run on high-octane aviation petrol where available.

The remaining offensive aircraft consisted of four RAF squadrons of Bristol Blenheim MkI and MKIV light bombers (27, 34, 60, 62 Squadrons), two RAAF squadrons (1 and 8) of Lockheed Hudsons, and two RAF squadrons of Vickers Vildebeest biplane torpedo bombers (36 and 100). The Vildebeests were obsolete and due to be replaced by modern Bristol Beaufort torpedo bombers. No 36 Squadron had some Fairey Albacore biplanes. There were also two Consolidated Catalina flying boats of 205 Squadron and three Catalinas from the Royal Netherlands East Indies Army Air Force at Singapore.

The squadrons were beset by numerous problems including inadequate spare parts and a lack of support staff, airfields that were difficult to defend against air attack with no early warning of impending attacks, a lack of a clear and coherent command structure, a Japanese spy in the Army air liaison staff (Heenan), and antagonism between RAF and RAAF squadrons and personnel. The Japanese through their network of informants knew the strength and disposition of Allied aircraft before they invaded.

Many of the pilots lacked adequate training and experience. For example, 20 of the original 169 Buffalos were lost in training accidents during 1941. Those fighter pilots with experience had been trained in methods that were very effective against German and Italian fighters but suicide against the acrobatic Japanese Nakajima Ki-43 "Oscar" and Mitsubishi A6M "Zero" fighters. A counter tactic of avoiding dog fights with a 'slash and run' attack was developed by Lieutenant-General Claire Lee Chennault of the Flying Tigers but was too late for the Allied pilots serving in this campaign.

Two days before the attack on Malaya, Hudsons of No 1 Squadron RAAF spotted the Japanese invasion fleet but, given uncertainty about the ships' destination and instructions to avoid offensive operations until attacks were made against friendly territory, Sir Robert Brooke-Popham, Commander-in-Chief of British Far East Command, did not allow the convoy to be bombed.

=== Air campaign ===
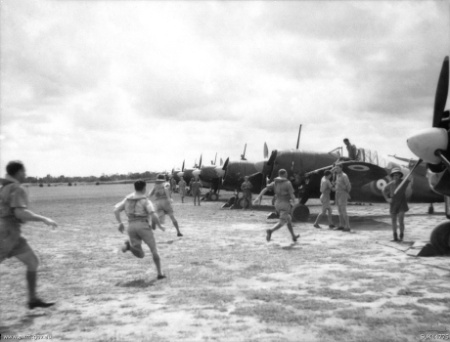
Pilots of No. 453 Squadron RAAF responding to a scramble order

On the first day, the focus of the Japanese air assault was on the Allied air bases. Mitsubishi Ki-21 Sallys from the 7th Hikodan bombed the airfields at Alor Star, Sungai Petani, and Butterworth. A total of 60 Allied aircraft were lost on the first day, primarily on the ground. Those Allied fighters that did manage to engage the Japanese performed adequately against the Nakajima Ki-27 "Nate". However, the appearance of ever greater numbers of Japanese fighters, including markedly superior types such as the Nakajima Ki-43 "Oscar" soon overwhelmed the Buffalo pilots, both in the air and on the ground.

While contesting the Japanese landings on Malaya, Hudsons from No. 1 Squadron RAAF based at Kota Bharu became the first aircraft to make an attack in the Pacific War, sinking Japanese transport ship Awazisan Maru, while also damaging Ayatosan Maru and Sakura Maru off the coast of Kota Bharu, for the loss of two Hudsons, at 0118h local time (an hour before the attack on Pearl Harbor). The Squadron was transferred to Kuantan the following day.

By 9 December, Japanese fighters were operating out of Singora and Patani, Thailand, and Kota Bharu airfield was in Japanese hands. The Allies tried to attack Singora airfield. The bombers were intercepted on take-off by a Japanese raid which disabled or shot down all but one. The sole surviving bomber, a Bristol Blenheim flown by Arthur Scarf, did manage to bomb Singora. No 62 squadron had been moved from Alor Star to Butterworth, and on 10 December it was moved to Taiping.

On 10 December, No 21 Squadron RAAF was withdrawn from Sungai Petani to Ipoh, where it was joined on 13 December by No 453 Squadron RAAF. No 453 Squadron had been sent to protect Force Z on 10 December, but arrived after the warships were sinking. On 15 December both Squadrons were pulled back to Kuala Lumpur, receiving replacement aircraft for those shot down or destroyed. Within the first week of the campaign the Japanese had established air superiority. On 19 December the bombers were moved to Singapore, with No 62 Squadron being re-equipped with Hudsons.

One pilot—Sergeant Malcolm Neville Read of No. 453 Squadron RAAF—sacrificed himself by ramming his Buffalo into an Oscar of 64th Sentai over Kuala Lumpur on 22 December.

Continued Japanese dominance eventually forced both Squadrons back to Singapore on 24 December, where they were merged until more replacement aircraft could be obtained. No 64 Squadron had run out of aircraft and its surviving ground-crew and airmen were shipped to Burma. RAAF No 1 and No 8 squadrons were amalgamated due to aircraft losses. This left the Allied ground troops and shipping completely open to air attack and further weakened the defensive position. The Genzan Air Group sank Prince of Wales and Repulse on 10 December, which also established Japanese naval supremacy. In comparison, the Japanese army enjoyed close air support from the start of the campaign, and sought to capture bases for their air support to operate from.

On 25 December, the Second division of Squadron 5, Royal Netherlands East Indies Army Air Force was deployed to Singapore, contributing to the Allied cause before being recalled to Java on 18 January. Several Dutch pilots—including Jacob van Helsdingen and August Deibel—responded to a number of air raids over Singapore while stationed at Kallang Airport. They claimed a total of six aircraft, particularly the Nakajima Ki-27 Nate, which fared poorly in Malaya.

On 3 January 1942, 51 disassembled Hurricane Mk IIBs arrived in Singapore along with 24 pilots (many of whom were veterans of the Battle of Britain) who had been transferred to there with the intention of forming the nucleus of five squadrons. The 151st Maintenance unit assembled the 51 Hurricanes within two days and of these, 21 were ready for operational service within three days. The Hurricanes were fitted with bulky 'Vokes' dust filters under the nose and were armed with 12, rather than eight, machine guns. The additional weight and drag made them slow to climb and unwieldy to maneuver at altitude, although they were more effective bomber killers.

The recently arrived pilots were formed into 232 Squadron. In addition, 488 (NZ) Squadron, a Buffalo squadron, converted to Hurricanes. On 18 January, the two squadrons formed the basis of 226 Group. The following day 453 squadron provided an escort of eight aircraft for five Wirraways and four NEI Glenn Martin bombers, attacking Japanese troops on the Muar River. All the Martins and one of the Wirraways were lost.

No 243 Squadron RAF, equipped with Buffalo fighters, was disbanded on 21 January and 232 Squadron became operational on 22 January, the same day the Genzan Air Group attacked Kallang Airport. 232 Squadron thus had the first losses and victories for the Hurricane in Southeast Asia that day. Most of the bombers were moved to Sumatra midway through January.

Aircraft from 36, 62, and 100 Squadrons unsuccessfully attacked the Japanese invasion fleet at Endau on 26 January, suffering heavy losses. The surviving aircraft were evacuated to Sumatra on 31 January.

In mid-January, the three Sentai of the 5th Air Corps returned to Thailand to participate in the Burma Campaign and the 3rd Air Corps turned its attention to the Netherlands East Indies. In the end, more than 60 Brewster aircraft were shot down in combat, 40 destroyed on the ground, and approximately 20 more destroyed in accidents. Only about 20 Buffalos survived to reach India or the Dutch East Indies. The last airworthy Buffalo in Singapore flew out on 10 February, five days before the island fell. The RAAF and RNZAF fighter squadrons left for Sumatra and Java at the beginning of February.

It is not entirely clear how many Japanese aircraft the Buffalo squadrons shot down, although RAAF pilots alone managed to shoot down at least 20. Eighty were claimed in total, a ratio of kills to losses of just 1.3 to 1. Additionally, most of the Japanese aircraft shot down by the Buffalos were bombers. The Hawker Hurricane, which fought in Singapore alongside the Buffalo from 20 January, also suffered severe losses from ground attack; most were destroyed.

== Advance down the Malayan Peninsula ==
=== Northern Malaya (December 1941) ===
The defeat of Allied troops at the Battle of Jitra by Japanese forces, supported by tanks moving south from Thailand on 11 December 1941 and the rapid advance of the Japanese inland from their Kota Bharu beachhead on the north-east coast of Malaya overwhelmed the northern defences. Without any real naval presence, the British were unable to challenge Japanese naval operations off the Malayan coast, which proved invaluable to the invaders. With virtually no remaining Allied planes, the Japanese also had mastery of the skies, leaving the Allied ground troops and civilian population exposed to air attack.

The Malayan island of Penang was bombed daily by the Japanese from 8 December and abandoned on 17 December. Arms, boats, supplies and a working radio station were left in haste to the Japanese. The evacuation of Europeans from Penang, with local inhabitants being left to the mercy of the Japanese, caused much embarrassment for the British and alienated them from the local population. Historians judge that "the moral collapse of British rule in Southeast Asia came not at Singapore, but at Penang". However, many who were present during the evacuation did not experience it as a scramble. It was a response to an order from British High Command which had come to the conclusion that Penang should be abandoned as it had no tactical or strategic value in the rapidly changing military scheme of things at that time.

On 23 December, Major-General David Murray-Lyon of the Indian 11th Infantry Division was removed from command to little effect. By the end of the first week in January, the entire northern region of Malaya had been lost to the Japanese. At the same time, Thailand officially signed a Treaty of Friendship with Imperial Japan, which completed the formation of their loose military alliance. Thailand was then allowed by the Japanese to resume sovereignty over several sultanates in northern Malaya, thus consolidating their occupation.

The 11th Indian Division managed to delay the Japanese advance at Kampar for a few days, in which the Japanese suffered severe casualties in terrain that did not allow them to use their tanks or their air superiority to defeat the British. The 11th Indian Division was forced to retreat when the Japanese landed troops by sea south of the Kampar position. The British retreated to prepared positions at Slim River.

=== Central Malaya (January 1942) ===
At the Battle of Slim River, in which two Indian brigades were practically annihilated, the Japanese used surprise and tanks to devastating effect in a risky night attack. The success of this attack forced Percival into replacing the 11th Indian Division with the 8th Australian Division., and cleared the route to the city of Kuala Lumpur.

It did not take long for the Japanese army's next objective, the city of Kuala Lumpur, to fall. The Japanese entered and occupied the city unopposed on 11 January 1942. Singapore Island was now less than 200 mi (320 km) away for the invading Japanese army.

== Southern Malaya: Defence of Johor ==
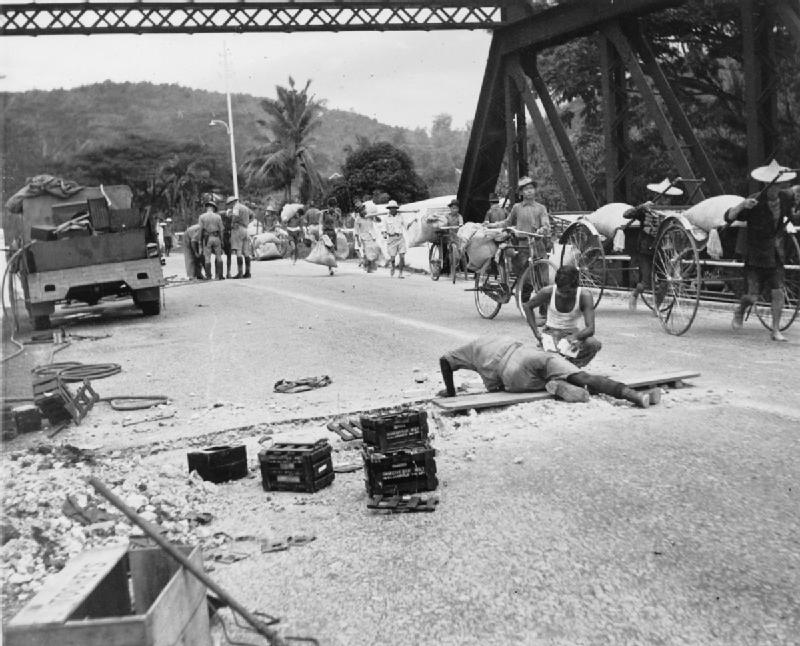
Royal Engineers preparing to blow up a bridge near Kuala Lumpur during the retreat

By mid-January, the Japanese had reached the southern Malayan state of Johore where, on 14 January, they encountered troops from the Australian 8th Division, commanded by Major-General Gordon Bennett, for the first time in the campaign. During engagements with the Australians, the Japanese experienced their first major tactical setback, due to the stubborn resistance put up by the Australians at Gemas. The battle—centred around the Gemencheh Bridge—proved costly for the Japanese, who suffered up to 600 casualties. However, the bridge itself (which had been demolished during the fighting) was repaired within six hours.

As the Japanese attempted to outflank the Australians to the west of Gemas, one of the bloodiest battles of the campaign began on 15 January on the peninsula's West coast near the Muar River. Bennett allocated the 45th Indian Brigade—a new and half-trained formation—to defend the river's South bank but the unit was outflanked by Japanese units landing from the sea and the Brigade was effectively destroyed with its commander, Brigadier H. C. Duncan, and all three of his battalion commanders killed. Two Australian infantry battalions—which had been sent to support the 45th Brigade—were also outflanked and their retreat cut off, with one of the Australian battalion commanders killed in the fighting around the town of Bakri, south-east of Muar. During the fighting at Bakri Australian anti-tank gunners had destroyed nine Japanese tanks, slowing the Japanese advance long enough for the surviving elements of the five battalions to attempt an escape from the Muar area.

Led by Australian Lieutenant-Colonel Charles Anderson, the surviving Indian and Australian troops formed the "Muar Force" and fought a desperate four-day withdrawal, allowing remnants of the Commonwealth troops withdrawing from northern Malaya to avoid being cut off and to push past the Japanese to safety. When the Muar Force reached the bridge at Parit Sulong and found it to be firmly in enemy hands, Anderson, with mounting numbers of dead and wounded, ordered "every man for himself". Those who could took to the jungles, swamps and rubber plantations in search of their division headquarters at Yong Peng. The wounded were left to the mercy of the Japanese, and all but two out of 135 were tortured and killed in the Parit Sulong Massacre. Anderson was awarded a Victoria Cross for his fighting withdrawal. The Battle of Muar cost the allies an estimated 3,000 casualties including one brigadier and four battalion commanders.

On 20 January, further Japanese landings took place at Endau, in spite of an air attack by Vildebeest bombers. The final Commonwealth defensive line in Johore of Batu Pahat–Kluang–Mersing was now being attacked along its full length. In the face of repeated requests from his Chief Engineer, Brigadier Ivan Simson, Percival had resisted the construction of fixed defences in Johore, as on the North shore of Singapore, dismissing them with the comment, "Defences are bad for morale." On 27 January, Percival received permission from the commander of the American-British-Dutch-Australian Command, General Archibald Wavell, to order a retreat across the Johore Strait to the island of Singapore.

== Retreat to Singapore ==
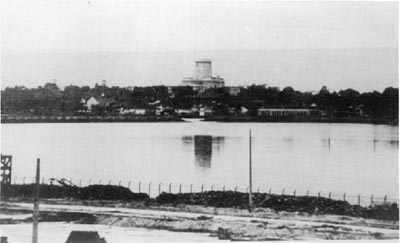
A view of the causeway, blown up after the Allied retreat, with the visible gap in the middle

On 31 January, the last organised Allied forces left Malaya, and Allied engineers blew a 70 ft (21 m)-wide hole in the causeway that linked Johore and Singapore; a few stragglers would wade across over the next few days. Japanese raiders and infiltrators, often disguised as Singaporean civilians, began to cross the Straits of Johor in inflatable boats soon afterwards.

In less than two months, the Battle for Malaya had ended in comprehensive defeat for the Commonwealth forces and their retreat from the Malay Peninsula to the fortress of Singapore. Nearly 50,000 Commonwealth troops had been captured or killed during the battle. The Japanese Army invaded the island of Singapore on 7 February and completed their conquest of the island on 15 February, capturing 80,000 more prisoners out of the 85,000 allied defenders. The final battle before the surrender was with the Malay Regiment at Bukit Candu on 14 February.

By the end of January, Heenan had been court-martialled for spying for the Japanese and sentenced to death. On 13 February, five days after the invasion of Singapore Island, and with Japanese forces approaching the city centre, he was taken by military police to the waterside and was hastily executed. His body was thrown into the sea.

=== The Sook Ching Massacre ===
In the immediate aftermath of Singapore's capture, Japanese forces systematically rounded up and screened Chinese males under arbitrary criteria. Kempeitai units and select army detachments systematically massacred detainees who were not "cleared" on Singapore's northeastern beaches. This process was named the Sook Ching, a "purification by elimination", a view borne from the resistance from Chinese irregular units in Singapore. In addition to Chinese victims, Japanese units also implemented public beheadings against Singapore's general population.

== Casualties ==
The Japanese 25th Army suffered between 9,657 and 14,768 casualties in the Malayan Campaign.

Allied losses were much heavier at 130,246 to 138,708, including around 7,500 to 8,000 killed, 10,000 to 11,000+ wounded and 120,000+ missing or captured. These numbers included 38,496 British casualties, 18,490 Australian, 67,340 Indian, and 14,382 Malayan volunteers.

Between 20,000 and 83,000 civilians were killed in the campaign, mostly victims of the Sook Ching Massacre. The exact death toll of the latter massacre is disputed; postwar senior Japanese officers have admitted to between 6,000 and 25,000 victims, while modern historians place the number as high as 70,000, including 50,000 in Singapore and 20,000 in the Malayan Peninsula.

== Battles of the campaign ==
- Battle of Kota Bharu (8 December 1941)
  Three transports landed some 5,200 troops at Kota Bharu (Malaysia's NE corner). The beaches had been prepared with wire and pillboxes, and were defended with artillery and aircraft. One Japanese transport was sunk, with two damaged. But after heavy fighting the Japanese succeeded in landing most of their troops with about 800 casualties.
- Bombing of Singapore (8 December 1941)
- Operation Krohcol (8 December 1941)
  This was an advance by commonwealth forces into Thailand to destroy the main road at "The Ledge". The operation failed due to delays in authorisation by Percival and resistance by Thai Police.
- Sinking of Prince of Wales and Repulse (10 December 1941)
  The British battleship Prince of Wales and battlecruiser Repulse were sunk by Japanese aircraft after relying on false intelligence as to the location of the landings. They had no air support. This was the first time any capital ships at sea had been sunk by aircraft.
- Battle of Jitra (11–13 December 1941)
- Battle of Kampar (1941)
- Battle of Slim River (1942)
- Battle of Gemas (1942)
- Battle of Muar (1942)
- Battle off Endau (1942)
- Battle of Singapore (1942)

== See also ==
- Far East prisoners of war
- Nanshin-ron
- Japanese invasion of Thailand
- Japanese occupation of Malaya
- Japanese order of battle during the Malayan Campaign
- Malaya Command: Order of Battle

== Notes ==
Where is Fiji's mention? They sent 800 troops as part of the commonwealth to the Malaysian Campaign.
