= Errol Frank Stoové =

Dutch executive (born 1947)

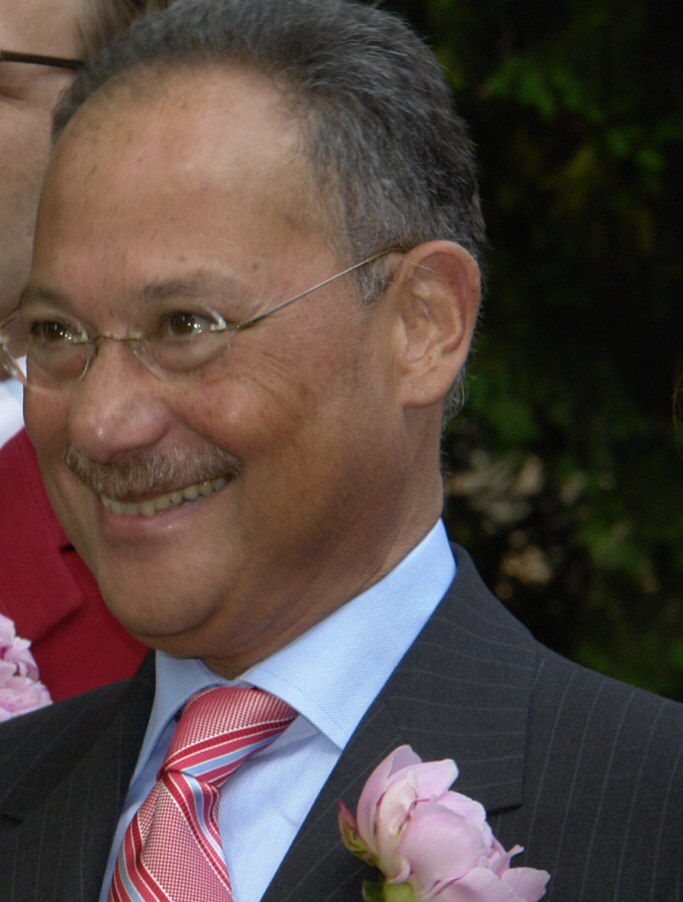
Errol Frank Stoové

Errol Frank "Erry" Stoové (born 1947 in Surabaya, then in the Dutch East Indies) is a Dutch executive.

In 1957, his family migrated to the Netherlands. In the Netherlands, he studied law at Utrecht University.

From 2010-2016 Stoové was the president of the International Social Security Association.
