= Jacob van Helsdingen =

Dutch pilot and military officer (1907–1942)

Jacob Pieter van Helsdingen
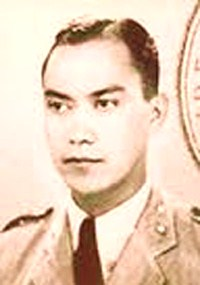
- Born: 7 March 1907; Soerabaja, Dutch East Indies
- Died: 7 March 1942 (aged 35); Lembang, Java
- Military career
- Allegiance: Netherlands
- Service years: 1941 – 1942
- Rank: Captain
- Unit: 2-VLG-V
- Conflicts: World War II; Battle of Malaya; Dutch East Indies campaign
- Awards: Military William Order

Jacob Pieter van Helsdingen (7 March 1907 – 7 March 1942) was a pilot of the Royal Netherlands East Indies Army Air Force. Van Helsdingen and August Deibel were the most successful Dutch pilots on the Brewster F2A fighter. He was twice awarded the Military William Order for bravery in battle.

== World War II ==
=== Singapore ===
Van Helsdingen's squadron arrived in Singapore on 9 December 1941 with 9-12 Brewster Buffalo fighters and was stationed at Kallang Airfield.

They first went into action on 12 January 1942 during a Japanese air raid over Singapore. At 10:00 hours, a formation of Japanese bombers appeared, escorted by five Ki-27 Nate fighters. They were intercepted by three Dutch Buffalos, who succeeded in chasing them away, damaging one of the bombers. When they returned in the afternoon, Van Helsdingen and two other pilots were scrambled to intercept them, encountering nine Ki-27s. Four of them were shot down, one by Van Helsdingen, with the Dutch losing one Buffalo.

When the Japanese raided Singapore again on 15 January, Van Helsdingen and two other pilots took off. They ran into an overwhelming number of A6M Zeros, scoring no kills and losing one Buffalo and its pilot. His squadron returned to Java on 18 January, missing out on the Battle of Singapore. Van Helsdingen led eight Buffalos to Semplak, while 23 others flew to Andir and Tjilitian.

=== Balikpapan ===
Van Helsdingen was awarded his first Military William Order on 11 February 1942, for carrying out attacks against Imperial Japanese Navy (IJN) ships in the Battle of Balikpapan on 23 January. Twenty Buffalo fighters carrying two 50 kg bombs each escorted nine Martin B-10 bombers to attack a fleet of IJN ships in the Makassar Strait. Eight hits were scored on four Japanese ships and one destroyer, sinking two transports, with the Dutch losing one Buffalo.

=== Lembang ===
Van Helsdingen was killed on his 35th birthday by an A6M Zero while providing air support to Royal Dutch East Indies Army forces fighting in Lembang with three other Buffalo aircraft on 7 March 1942.

Despite the Japanese having an almost complete air superiority over Java, he nevertheless chose to take off from Andir airfield. He ordered another pilot to stand down and hand over his Buffalo aircraft to him because he was married, despite the fact that Van Helsdingen was himself married. Three other pilots, 1st Lieutenant August Deibel, Gerard Bruggink (flying B-3107) and Officer Cadet Jan Scheffer, volunteered to join him using the last three working Buffalo aircraft on the airfield.

The squadron travelled 200 metres before running into three Japanese A6M Zeros. Deibel's plane was hit in the oil tank and had to break off from combat. His wingman, Scheffer, escorted him back to Andir airfield, where Deibel crash landed his aircraft without injury. The other two remained above Lembang, but were now dogfighting six Zeroes. Van Helsdingen shot down a Zero before he too was hit, but Bruggink managed to escape into the clouds before returning to Andir airfield. Jacob's body was never found. The Dutch forces in Lembang surrendered the next day. All four Dutch pilots were awarded the Military William Order, while Van Helsdingen and Scheffer (who died a prisoner of war) were posthumously awarded the honour on 14 July 1948.
