= Airman's Cross =

Military decoration of the Netherlands

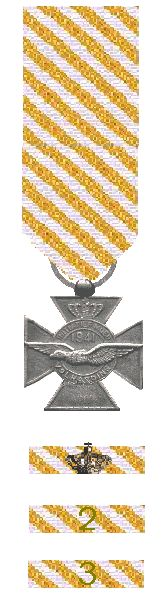
- The Airman's Cross with ribbon bars
- Type: Military award
- Awarded for: display of initiative, courage and perseverance against the enemy during flight in an aircraft
- Presented by: Kingdom of the Netherlands
- Status: Currently awarded
- First award: 1941
- Final award: Major M. Duivesteijn

Highlights
- Total: 735

Precedence
- Next (higher): Cross of Merit
- Next (lower): Honorary Medal for Charitable Assistance (silver or bronze)

The Airman's Cross (Dutch: Vliegerkruis) is a military decoration of the Kingdom of the Netherlands created in 1941. The cross is awarded to members of the Dutch military who display initiative, courage, and perseverance against the enemy or during hostile actions during one or more flights. The cross is also awarded to allied pilots whose actions were of high importance to the Netherlands.

A total of 735 Airman's Crosses have been awarded, most recently in 2007 to Royal Netherlands Air Force Major M. Duivesteijn, an F-16 pilot. Major Duivesteijn received the award because of his "exceptional courage and perseverance" during a 1999 flight that was part of the NATO bombing of Yugoslavia. Other well-known recipients include Erik Hazelhoff Roelfzema (the "Soldier of Orange"), Prince Bernhard of the Netherlands, and Ida Veldhuyzen van Zanten.

The Airman's Cross is the fifth-highest Dutch military decoration still being awarded for bravery (after the Cross of Merit).

== Description ==
The Airman's Cross resembles the Dutch Bronze Cross but is worn on a diagonally-striped orange and white ribbon inspired by those of the British Distinguished Flying Cross and Air Force Cross.

The cross is silver with four arms. There is a crowned central medallion bearing an albatross in flight with the words "INITIATIEF MOED VOLHARDING" (INITIATIVE COURAGE PERSEVERANCE) around the edge of the medallion. The date 1941 appears above the body of the albatross. The reverse is plain.
