= Royal Netherlands East Indies Army Air Force =

- Militaire Luchtvaart van het Koninklijk Nederlands-Indisch Leger
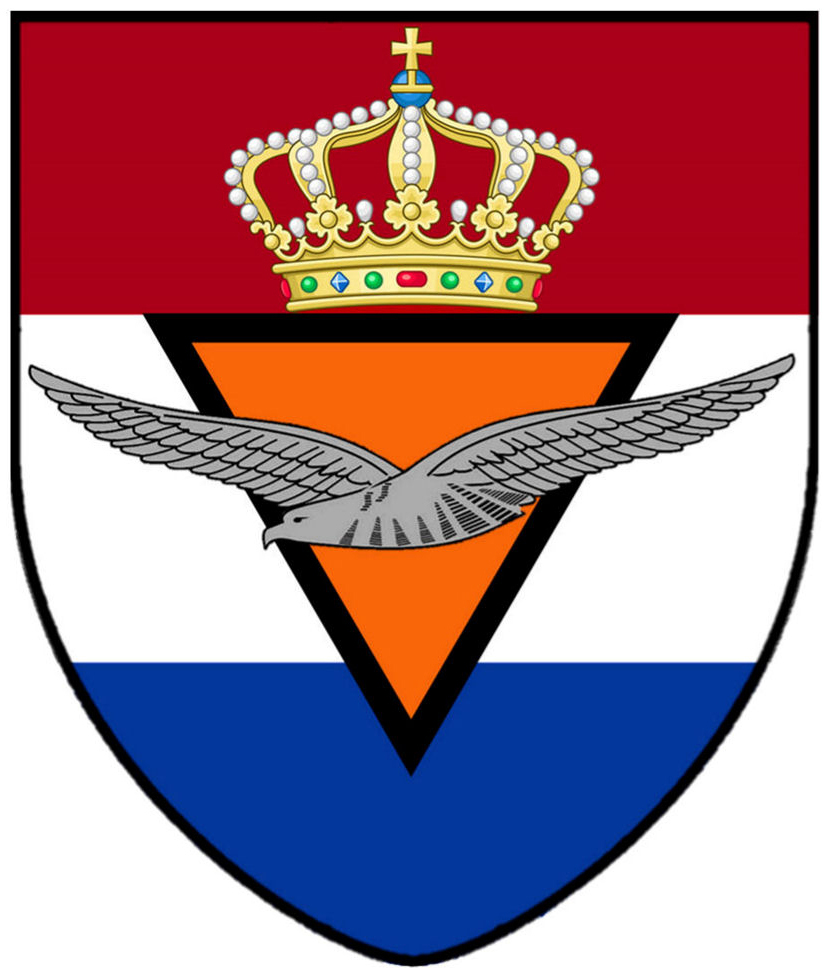
- Active: 1915–1950
- Country: Netherlands
- Branch: Royal Netherlands East Indies Army
- Type: Air force
- Role: Aerial warfare
- Aircraft: See list below
- Engagements: World War II; Indonesian War of Independence

Commanders
- Notable commanders: See list below

Insignia
- Roundel circa 1921–1939 & 1948–1950

- Roundel 1939–1942

- Roundel 1942–1948

The Royal Netherlands East Indies Army Air Force (Dutch: Militaire Luchtvaart van het Koninklijk Nederlands-Indisch Leger, ML-KNIL) was the air arm of the Royal Netherlands East Indies Army in the Dutch East Indies (now Indonesia) from 1939 until 1950. It was an entirely separate organisation from the Royal Netherlands Air Force.

The unit was founded in 1915 as the "Test Flight Service" (Proefvliegafdeling-KNIL, PVA-KNIL). In 1921, it became the "Aviation Service" (Luchtvaartafdeling-KNIL, LA-KNIL), before finally receiving the designation of ML-KNIL on 30 March 1939. In 1950, following Dutch recognition of Indonesian independence, its bases and facilities were handed over to the Indonesian Air Force (TNI-AU).

== World War II ==
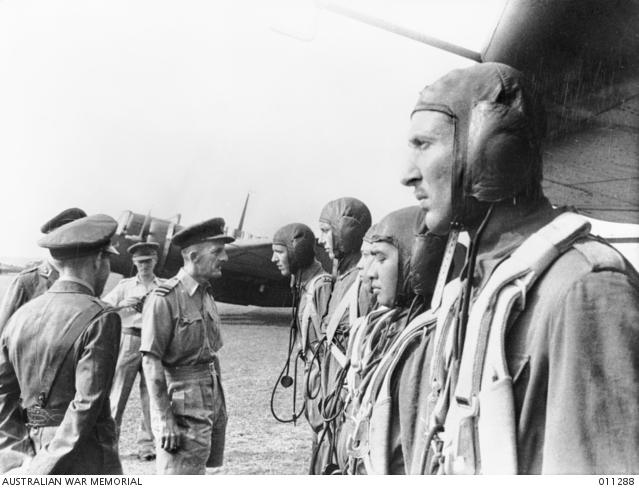
Air Vice-Marshal Conway Pulford greeting pilots of the ML-KNIL in Singapore, January 1942

On 1 January 1942, the Dutch forces joined the American-British-Dutch-Australian Command, but at the onset of the Japanese assault the ML-KNIL was not up to full combat strength. Of the aircraft that had been ordered, only a small number had been delivered, and many were obsolete models. There were five groups, three of bombers and two of fighters, each of three to four squadrons. A sixth depot group provided support, transport and training. Reconnaissance aircraft were placed directly under command of the Army to give support to ground troops.

Despite stubborn resistance the Japanese occupied the Dutch colonies, though numbers of aircraft found their way to northern Australia to continue the fight.

Four Dutch squadrons were formed in Australia. The first of these, No. 18 (NEI) Squadron RAAF, was formed in April 1942 as a medium bomber squadron equipped with B-25 Mitchell aircraft. The second joint Australian-NEI squadron, No. 119 (NEI) Squadron RAAF, was also to be a medium bomber squadron. No. 119 NEI Squadron was only active between September and December 1943 when it was disbanded to form No. 120 (NEI) Squadron RAAF, was a fighter squadron. In 1944, the KNIL formed No. 1 Netherlands East Indies Transport Squadron, later absorbed by the RAAF as No. 19 (NEI) Squadron RAAF. Both No. 18 and No. 120 Squadrons saw action against the Japanese during World War II.

From late 1945, numbers 18, 19 and 120 squadrons fought against Indonesian nationalists, during the Indonesian National Revolution. The squadrons were disbanded in 1950.

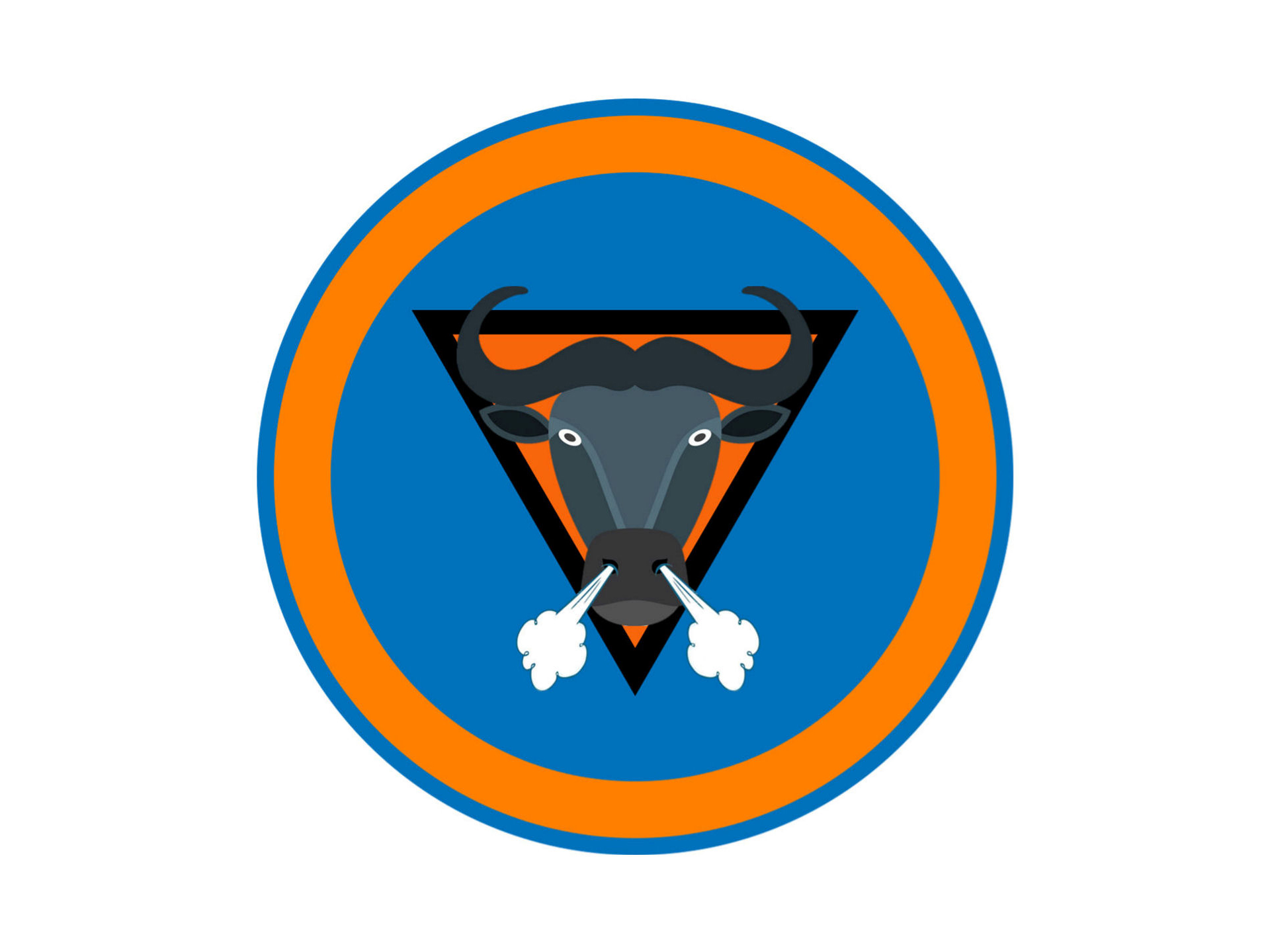
No. 120 (Netherlands East Indies) Squadron RAAF Badge 1943–1946

== Aircraft ==
=== 1915–1918 ===
- Deperdussin-Léon de Brouckère Monoplane (never flown)
- Farman F.22
- Léon de Brouckère No.1 & No.2 (type reconnaissance & trainer, Farman copies)
- Glenn L. Martin Model TT
- Glenn L. Martin Model TA
- Glenn L. Martin Model TE
- Glenn L. Martin Model R

=== 1919–1935 ===
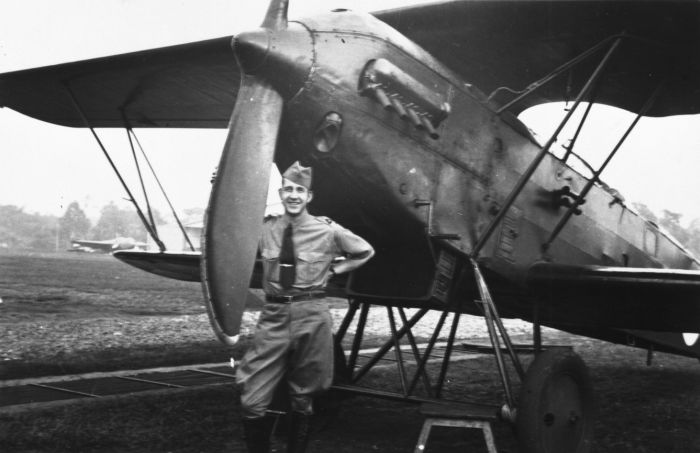
A pilot with his Fokker C.V, 1937

- Avro 504K
- Curtiss P-6E Hawk
- De Havilland DH-9
- Fokker C.IV
- Fokker C.V (D/E)
- Fokker C.X
- Fokker DC.1
- Fokker D.VII
- Fokker F.VIIb-3m
- Fokker S.IV
- Morane-Saulnier AR / MS.35
- NVI F.K.31
- Pander D
- Vickers Viking

=== 1936–1942 ===
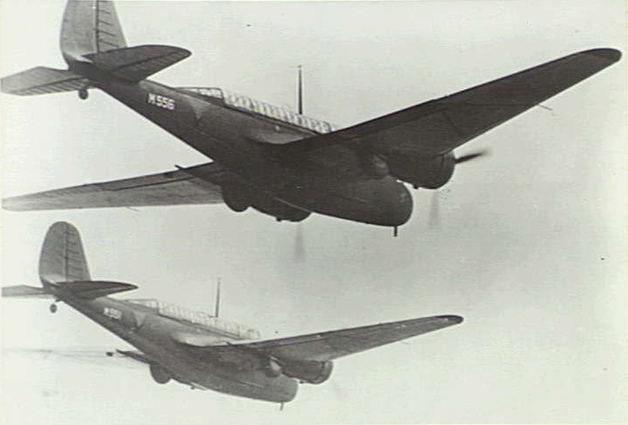
ML-KNIL Martin 166 bombers over Malaya in January 1942

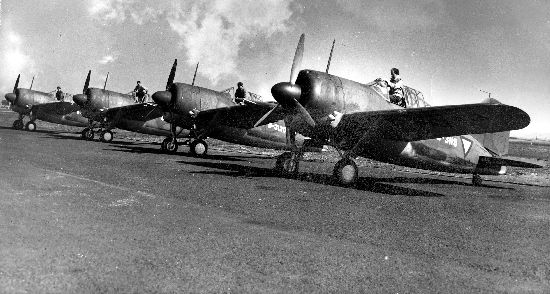
ML-KNIL Brewster F2A Buffalo fighters

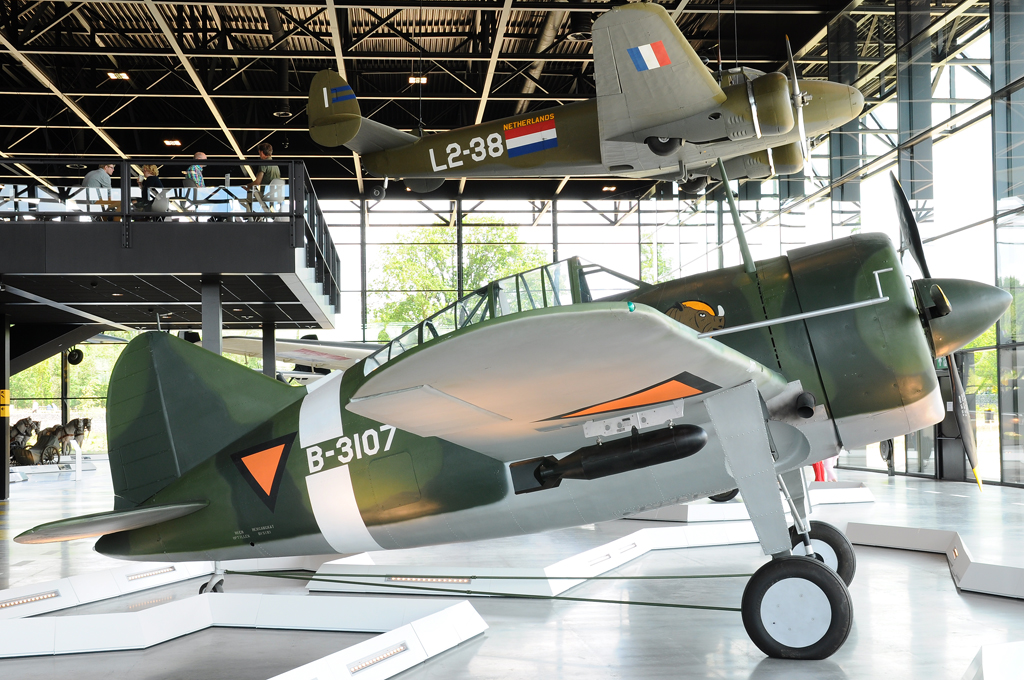
Brewster B-339C Buffalo replica on display at the National Military Museum in Soesterberg, Netherlands

- Brewster B-339C/D (export Brewster Buffalo)
- Bücker Bü 131 Jungmann
- Commonwealth CA-6 Wackett
- Consolidated Model 28-5MN
- Consolidated Model 28-5AMN
- Curtiss Model 75A-7 (export P-36 Hawk)
- Curtiss-Wright CW-21B
- Curtiss-Wright CW-22 Falcon
- Douglas C-47 Dakota
- Dornier Do 24K
- Douglas DC-3
- Fairchild F-24R-9
- Glenn Martin 139/166 (export B-10)
- Hawker Hurricane IIb
- Lockheed 212
- Lockheed 12
- Lockheed Model 18 Lodestar

=== 1942–1950 ===
- Douglas C-54 Skymaster
- Curtiss P-40E/N Kittyhawk
- Mitsubishi Ki-57 "Topsy"
- Koolhoven F.K.51
- Lockheed C60 Lodestar
- Messerschmitt Bf 108B-1
- North American P-51 Mustang D/K
- Noorduyn Norseman
- North American AT-16 Harvard
- North American B-25 Mitchell C/D/J
- Piper J-4E
- Piper L-4J
- Ryan STM-2
- Supermarine Spitfire
- Taylorcraft L-2 Grasshopper
- Tiger Moth
- Waco EGC-7
- Waco UKC

== Commanders ==
- 1915 Captain C.E. Visscher
- 1917 Captain C.L. Vogelesang
- 1919 Captain C. van Houten
- 1921 Captain J.A. Roukes
- 1924 Captain P.F. Hoeksema de Groot
- 1927 Major J. Beumer
- 1928 Lieutenant-Colonel J.H. Wesseling
- 1932 Major G.A. Ilgen
- 1934 Major-General L.H. van Oyen
- 1945 Major-General E.T. Kengen
- 1946 Colonel P.J. de Broekert
- 1948 Major-General C.W. van der Eem

== See also ==
- Royal Netherlands East Indies Army
- Hein ter Poorten
- Jacob van Helsdingen
- Albert Eduard Stoové
- August Deibel
- Gerard Bruggink
- Netherlands East Indies campaign
- Jan Hilgers
- Free Dutch Forces
