= List of Supermarine Spitfire operators =

This is a list of operators of the Supermarine Spitfire and Seafire.

== Operators ==
=== Australia ===
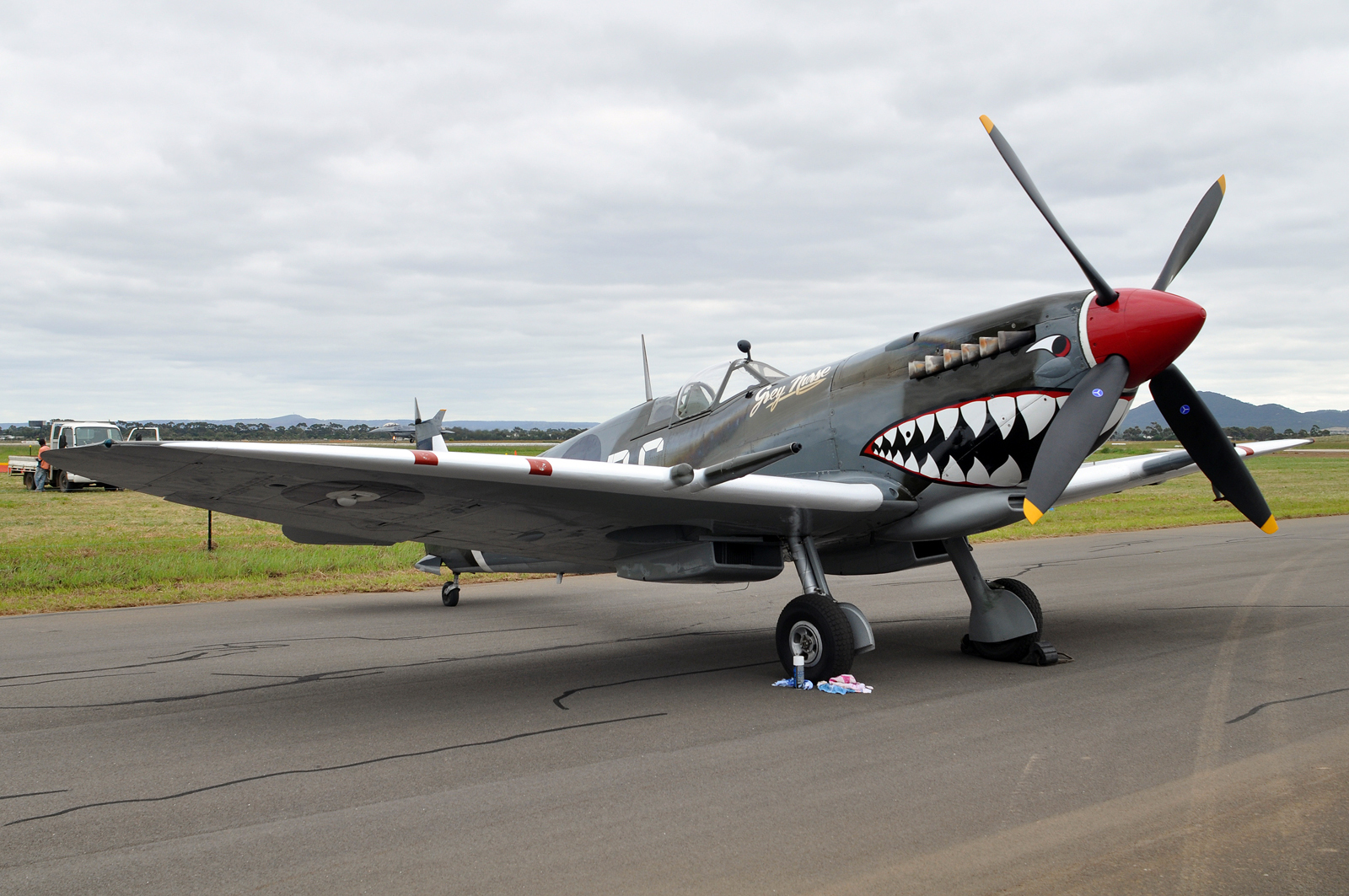
The Spitfire Mk VIII in the "Grey Nurse" markings used by No. 457 Squadron RAAF in the South West Pacific Area, but with the personal markings of Wing Commander Robert Gibbs, is one of two Spitfires still flying in Australia, both now owned by the Royal Australian Air Force as airworthy warbirds.

Royal Australian Air Force

- No. 79 Squadron RAAF 1943–1945
- No. 85 Squadron RAAF 1943–1945
- No. 451 Squadron RAAF 1943–1946
- No. 452 Squadron RAAF 1941–1945
- No. 453 Squadron RAAF 1942–1946
- No. 457 Squadron RAAF 1941–42, 1942–1945
- No. 100 Squadron RAAF (Air Force Heritage Squadron) 2021–present

The RAAF Fighter Squadrons mentioned above used the Spitfire in Europe, North Africa, Australia, New Guinea and the Pacific War. Additionally many Operation Training Units [OTUs] based in Australia operated the Spitfire as part of the Empire Air Training Scheme [EATS]. Some RAF squadrons also flew Spitfires in Australia:

- 54 Squadron Royal Air Force
- 548 Squadron Royal Air Force
- 549 Squadron Royal Air Force

RAAF Spitfire 453 squadron fought in Europe. Formed in New South Wales, they were based in Britain, and after the surrender of Germany, they remained in Britain for several months but later were deployed to join the British occupation forces in Germany on the 29th of August.

RAAF 451 Squadron fought in North Africa and the Mediterranean. When it was assigned to defend the Nile Delta area in 1943, it operated Hurricanes and a detachment of Spitfire fighters for high-altitude interceptions. In early 1944 it was completely equipped with Spitfires and based in Corsica. Now its mission changed to support operations in Italy and southern France, missions consisted mainly in escorting bombers and conducting armed reconnaissance patrols. In late 1944 it was transferred to the United Kingdom, where it was based until moved to Germany at the end of the war.

When fighters were needed to defend the Northern Territory from the Japanese, the RAAF started receiving American fighters but Australian government wanted RAF Spitfires to be deployed to Australia. The Spitfire had better high altitude performance than the RAAF P-40 Kittyhawk and was considered by RAAF as the best fighter Australia could get. In 1942, RAAF 452 Squadron, RAAF 457 Squadron, and RAAF and RAF 54 Squadron were moved to Australia as 1st Wing RAAF. They saw a lot of combat over the first twelve months fighting Japanese bombers, recon, and fighter sweeps.

RAAF 79th Squadron was used in New Guinea and the Solomons campaign for protection of the airfields which the American heavy bombers used. In late 1943, 79 Squadron relocated to Morotai.

As Mk. V Spitfires were quickly worn out by combat operations in 1943, new Mk. VIII Spitfire started to arrive to RAAF. Unfortunately the Spitfire plane was not rugged enough for the flying conditions of Northern Australia and the Pacific and had numerous technical and mechanical failures. It did not help that supporting Spitfire squadrons on remote Pacific islands proved to be a nightmare due to poor logistics. Operationally its short range was a handicap for the Pacific theatre.

- RAAF 551 Squadron was formed in Australia in February 1941.
- RAAF 452 Squadron was created in UK in April 1941. Started fighting in Europe and later transferred to Australia.
- RAAF 453 Squadron. Reformed in 1941 in June 1942 and equipped with Supermarine Spitfire aircraft to be part of RAF Fighter Command. Fought in Europe.
- RAAF 457 Squadron was created in UK in June 1941. Started fighting in Europe and later transferred to Australia.
- RAAF 79 Squadron was created In April 1943 in Australia. It included Australian pilots had already fought in North Africa.
- RAAF 85 Squadron was formed in 1943 with Brewster Buffaloes and in late 1944 received Mk.Vs retired from 79 Squadron.

Two airworthy Spitfires, a Mk. VIII and a Mk. XVI. were acquired from Temora Aviation Museum by the RAAF in July 2019 as part of the Temora Historic Flight. From March 2021 they will be operated by the Air Force Heritage Squadron as warbirds.

Royal Australian Navy

After the war some Spitfires were used as trainers for newcomers at the RAAF. The planes were worn out, only lasting for short flights among the sea space.

=== Belgium ===
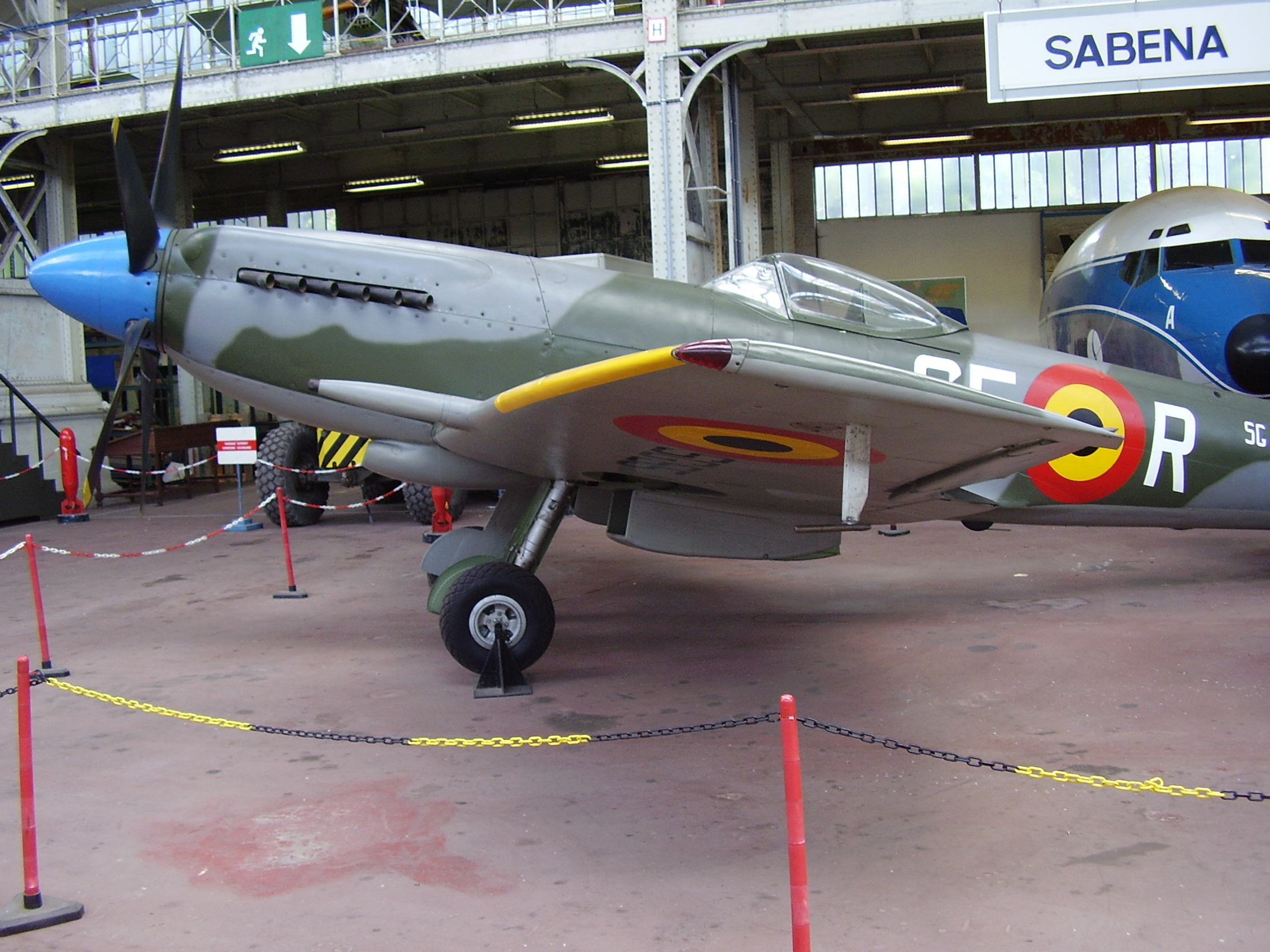
Belgian Spitfire exhibited in Royal Military Museum in Brussels

Belgian Air Force

- No. 349 Squadron RAF 1943–1945 1945–46
- No. 350 Squadron RAF 1941–1946

After the war, Spitfires FR.14 variants were supplied to the Belgian Air Force and flew with Nos. 349 and 350 Squadrons of the 1st Wing at Beauvechain, Nos 1, 2, and 3 Squadrons of the 2nd Wing at Florennes, Nos 23, 27 and 31 Squadrons of the 10th Wing at Chièvres, and the Fighter School at Koksijde.

=== Burma ===
Burma Air Force

The Myanmar Air Force (MAF), was formed as the Burmese Air Force on 16 January 1947, while Burma (as Myanmar was known until 1989) was still under British rule. By 1948, the fleet of the new air force included 40 Airspeed Oxfords, 16 de Havilland Tiger Moths, four Austers, and three Supermarine Spitfires transferred from the RAF. Douglas Dakotas were acquired ca 1950. In 1953, the Burmese Air Force bought 30 Supermarine Spitfires from Israel and 20 Supermarine Seafires from the United Kingdom. In 1957 the Burmese Air Force procured 21 Hawker Sea Fury fighters from the UK. Israel sold second-hand Spitfires to Burma, which had acquired them from Czechoslovakia and Italy and they remained operational until the 1960s.

=== Canada ===
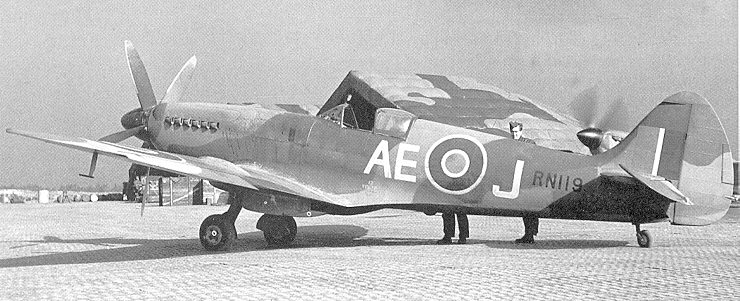
Spitfire F. MK XIV of 402(RCAF) squadron

Canada operated many Spitfires in both their fighter and fighter-bomber configurations, but only owned 8. No. 403 Squadron was the first to fly them for Canadian Operations in 1941 and a total of 14 squadrons would fly them over the course of the war. Of those, 3 formed an RCAF Fighter-Reconnaissance Wing, 10 Squadrons flew them in Europe. The remaining squadron, No. 417 flew fighter-bombers in North Africa, Sicily, and Italy. One of the first Messerschmitt Me 262 to be shot down was by a spitfire from No. 401 Squadron. Spitfires were also used in the Burma Campaign, but to an unknown extent.

Royal Canadian Air Force

- No. 400 Squadron RCAF
- No. 401 Squadron RCAF 1941–1945
- No. 402 Squadron RCAF 1942–1945
- No. 403 Squadron RCAF 1941–1945
- No. 411 Squadron RCAF 1941–1946
- No. 412 Squadron RCAF 1941–1945
- No. 414 Squadron RCAF 1943–1945
- No. 416 Squadron RCAF
- No. 417 Squadron RCAF
- No. 421 Squadron RCAF 1943–1945
- No. 430 Squadron RCAF
- No. 441 Squadron RCAF 1944–45
- No. 442 Squadron RCAF
- No. 443 Squadron RCAF 1944–1946
- No. 13 Squadron RCAF

Royal Canadian Navy

=== Czechoslovakia ===
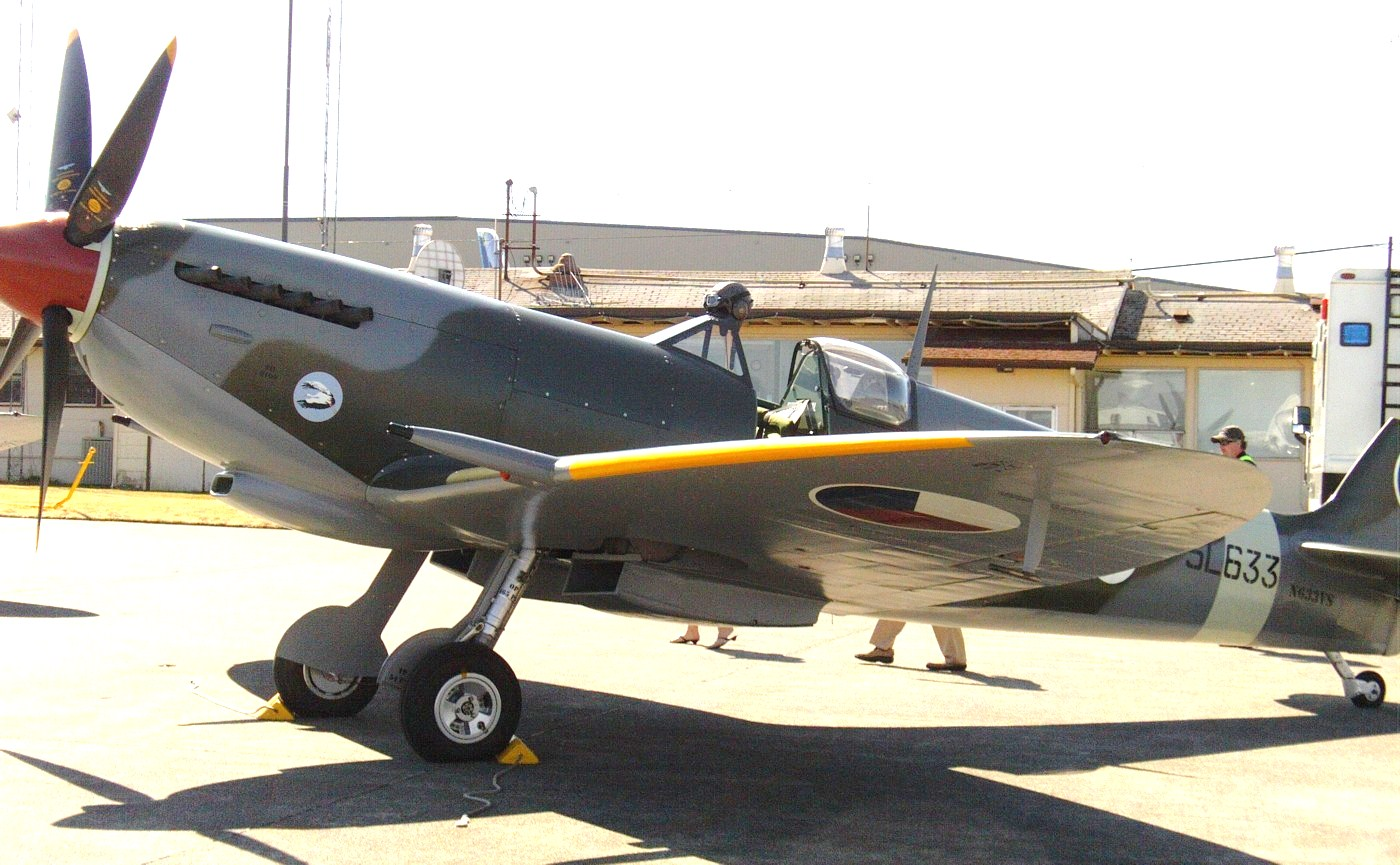
Supermarine Spitfire LF Mk IX C

Czech Air Force in exile in Great Britain

- No. 310 Squadron RAF 1941–1946
- No. 312 Squadron RAF 1941–1946
- No. 313 Squadron RAF 1941–1945

Three RAF squadrons were manned by Czechoslovak pilots that had escaped to Poland and France, and after the Battle of France arrived to United Kingdom.

- On 10 July 1940 first Czech fighter squadron was established at Duxford. 310 Squadron became operational and equipped with Hurricanes fought in the Battle of Britain. In July 1941 moved to Scotland to transition to Supermarine Spitfire IIa. Some months later Spitfire Vbs were received. In 1944 the squadron re-equipped with Spitfire Mk. IX and became a fighter-bomber unit.
- 312 Squadron was formed in August 1940, also equipped with Hurricanes. It changed to Spitfires in October 1941. In September 1943 it became a fighter-bomber unit with Spitfire Mk. IX.

Czechoslovak Air Force
Czechoslovak National Security Guard

After the end of the war in late 1945 Czechoslovak RAF Spitfire squadrons were transferred to the Czechoslovak armed forces. All Free Czechoslovak Air Force squadrons were merged in 313 squadron, equipped with Spitfires MK.IX. They were the fighter force in the postwar Czechoslovak air force until Communist Putsch in 1948 removed all wartime serving Czechs pilots and planes from the air force placing them into prison camps or forced labour. The new communist government was supplied with Soviet fighters and hastily get rid of the Spitfires, selling them to Israel.

=== Denmark ===
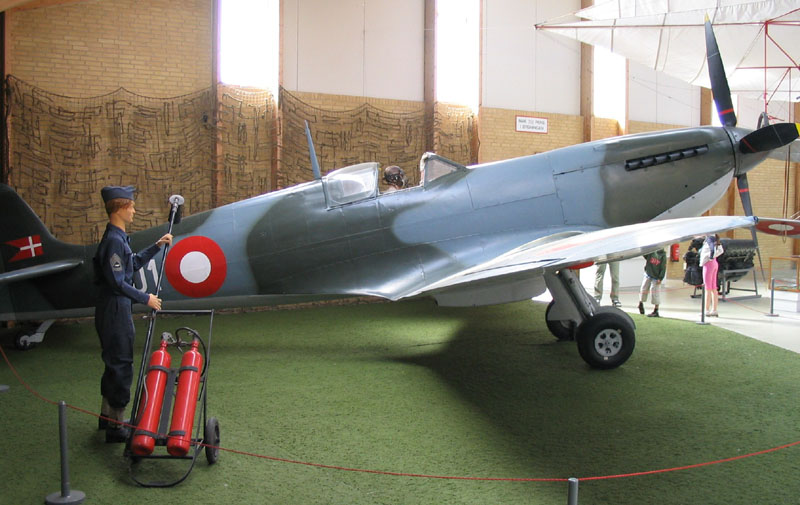
Danish Spitfire in Stauning Aircraft Museum

Royal Danish Air Force

38 Supermarine HF MK IX E were in service from 1947 – 1955 as day fighters. 3 Supermarine PR MK XI was in service from 1947 – 1955 in a photo reconnaissance role.

=== Egypt ===
Royal Egyptian Air Force

In the immediate post-war period surplus Supermarine Spitfire Mk. IXs were acquired. Egypt operated 26 Mk. V Spitfires from 1943 to 1949 and 38 Mk. IX planes from 1946 to 1955. In 1948 Spitfire Mk. IX was the main fighter in Egyptian Air Force, so they clashed with Israeli fighters. They also suffered heavy losses in attacks, as in May 1948 when Spitfires of 2 Sqn mistakenly attacked RAF base in Ramat David and lost five planes. From 1947 – 1956, the Egyptian Air Force operated some Spitfire Mk. 22 and one Mk. IX two seats trainer.

=== France ===
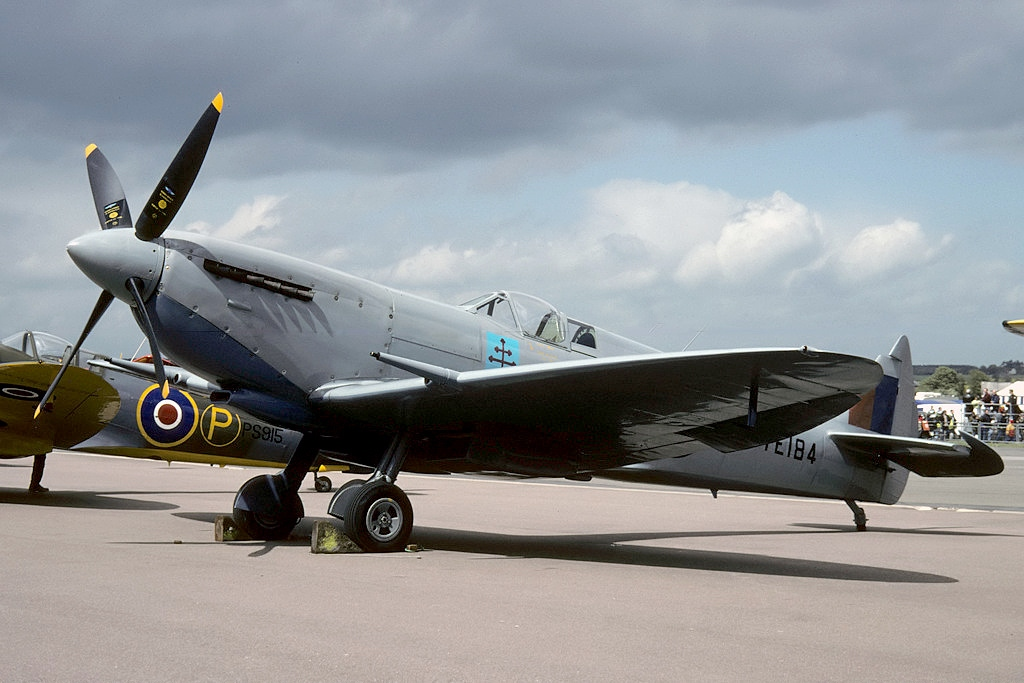
Seen here in a very short lived Free French Air Force color scheme

Free French Air Force

- No. 326 Squadron 1943–1945
- No. 327 Squadron
- No. 328 Squadron
- No. 329 Squadron 1944–45
- No. 340 Squadron 1941–1945
- No. 341 Squadron 1943–1945
- No. 345 Squadron 1944–45

Free French Spitfire Squadrons operated under RAF command, having its RAF squadron number and French Fighter group number:

- 340 (Free French) Squadron, G.C. IV/2 "Ile de France", was formed in Scotland in November 1941.
- 341 (Free French) Squadron, G.C. III/2 "Alsace", was formed in January 1943 with Free French Air Forces personnel transferred from various RAF fighter squadrons in North Africa.
- 345 (Free French) Squadron, G.C. II/2 "Berry", was formed in Scotland in January 1944 with French pilots who had been based in North Africa.
- 329 (Free French) Squadron, G.C. I/2 "Cicognes", was formed in July 1941.

Squadron 329 operated in North Africa and later moved to UK. These squadrons supported the allied advance from Normandy beachheads across Europe. In 1945 were based in Germany and transferred to French command.

After reunification in July 1943 ex-Vichy Fighter Squadrons (Air Force and Navy) equipped joined former Free French squadrons, inside RAF organization, and converted to Spitfires.

- No.326 Squadron was G.C. II/7 'Nice', created in 1943. Its first mission as GC II/7 was an armed reconnaissance mission on April 30, 1943. In June replaced its Mk. VB Spitfires with Mk .IX variant. First Armée de l'Air unit to be stationed on French soil, when it was based in Corsica at the end of 1943.
- No.327 Squadron was G.C. I/3 'Corse', created in North Africa in early 1943.
- No.328 Squadron was G.C. I/7 'Provence', created in Corsica in December 1943.

The three squadrons formed 1ère Escadre de Chasse (1st Fighter Wing), with 20 Spitfires in each squadron. All were initially equipped with Spitfire Vs received from RAF, but later received other versions.

These squadrons were based in Corsica from 1943 and covered the Allied landing in Southern France in August 1944. Later they moved to Alsace-Lorraine, supporting the First French Army advance into Germany.

Armee de l'Air

After world War two French Air Force had about 300 Spitfires in Europe. Some more were acquired by refurbishing spitfires found in North Africa scrap depots.

First French used in Indochina war were spitfires. The RAF transferred 246 Squadron's Spitfire Mk. VIIIs to French Air Force. More were received from RAF surplus or were transferred from France

Aviation Navale

The French Aviation purchased Seafires to operate from ex-Royal Navy aircraft carriers H.M.S. Biter (future Dixmude) and Colossus (future Arromanches). France bought a first batch of 50 and a second batch of 65 Seafire Mk IIIs. Some Seafire XV planes were later bought to meet NATO missions. French Navy purchased a total of 179 Mk. III and 15 Mk .XV for Fighter Squadrons 1.F, 12.F and flights 10.S, 11.S, 54.S; and also Rochefort school flight.

Two squadrons were deployed on the carrier Arromanches in 1948 to fight in the Indochina War. Aviation naval Seafires operated from land bases and from Arromanches on ground attack missions until January 1949. After returning to Europe Seafires were replaced with Seafire XVs and in 1950 these were replaced by Grumman F6F Hellcats.

=== Germany ===
Luftwaffe captured several Spitfires and used them to test, and for operational training duties.

Luftwaffe

- 2./Versuchsverband ObdL
- KG 200

=== Greece ===
Royal Hellenic Air Force

- No. 335 Squadron RAF
- No. 336 Squadron RAF
- No. 337 Squadron RHAF

=== Hong Kong ===
Royal Hong Kong Auxiliary Air Force
RAF at RAF Kai Tak

- No. 80 Squadron RAF
- No. 81 Squadron RAF 1943–1954
- No. 132 Squadron RAF 1941–1946
- No. 681 Squadron RAF 1943–1946

RAF at RAF Sek Kong

- No. 80 Squadron RAF

=== India ===
Indian Air Force Supermarine Spitfire at Air Force Museum, Palam, Delhi

The Supermarine Spitfire was not provided for the IAF until late 1944. IAF was highly successful in flying the Spitfire for bombing operations in the last stages of the war.

When British India split into two countries in 1947 the IAF chose to include in its inventory the Spitfire but the main combat aircraft in inventory was the Hawker Tempest. These Spitfires spent most of their career in the IAF as advanced trainers, although they were used in action during the invasion of Kashmir in light bombardment and tactical reconnaissance to interdict enemy lines of supply.

Indian Air Force

- No.1 Squadron, IAF
- No.2 Squadron, IAF
- No.3 Squadron, IAF
- No.4 Squadron, IAF
- No.6 Squadron, IAF
- No.7 Squadron, IAF
- No.8 Squadron, IAF.This was the first Indian squadron to be equipped with Spitfires, tasked with defending the city of Calcutta, occasionally attacked by Japanese aircraft.
- No.9 Squadron, IAF
- No.10 Squadron, IAF
- No.12 Squadron, IAF
- No.14 Squadron, IAF
- No.15 Squadron, IAF
- No.16 Squadron, IAF
- No.101 Squadron, IAF
- No.1 Service Flying and Training School, Ambala
- Conversion Training Unit IAF

=== Ireland ===
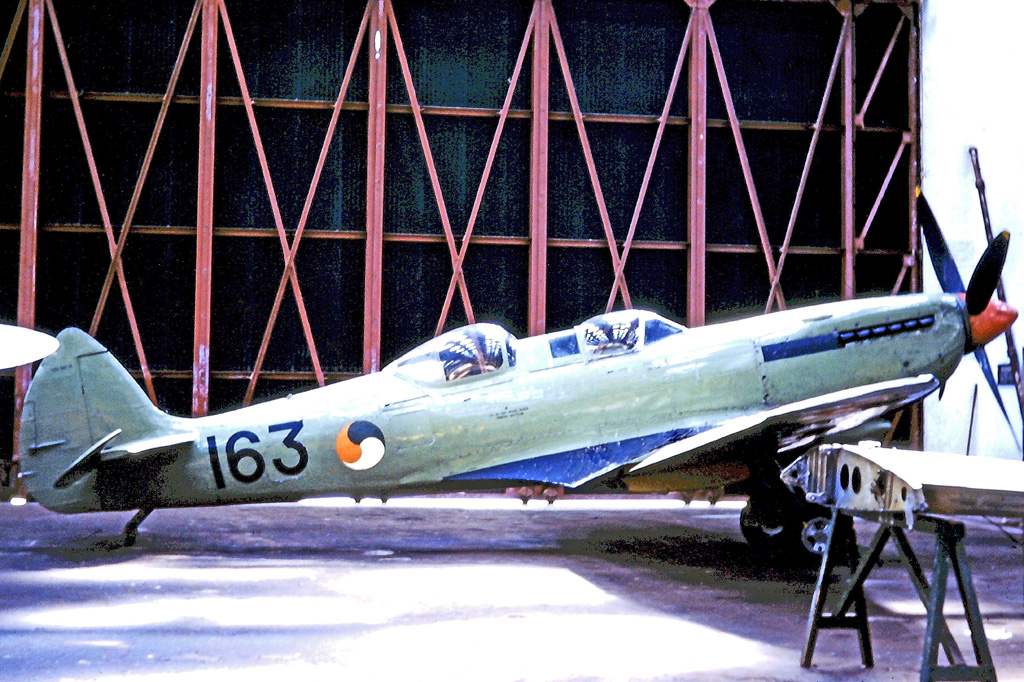
Supermarine Spitfire T.9 163 of the Irish Air Corps at Baldonnel (Casement) airfield in 1967

The Irish Air Corps operated 12 LF.III Spitfires, in its de-navalized Seafire model between 1947 and 1955, and were at once very popular with the crews. This prompted the purchase of the two-seat trainer version, the Spitfire T9, which served between 1951 and 1961.

Irish Air Corps

- No 1. Fighter Squadron (1947–1955)
- Air Corps Training Wing (1951–1961)

=== Israel ===
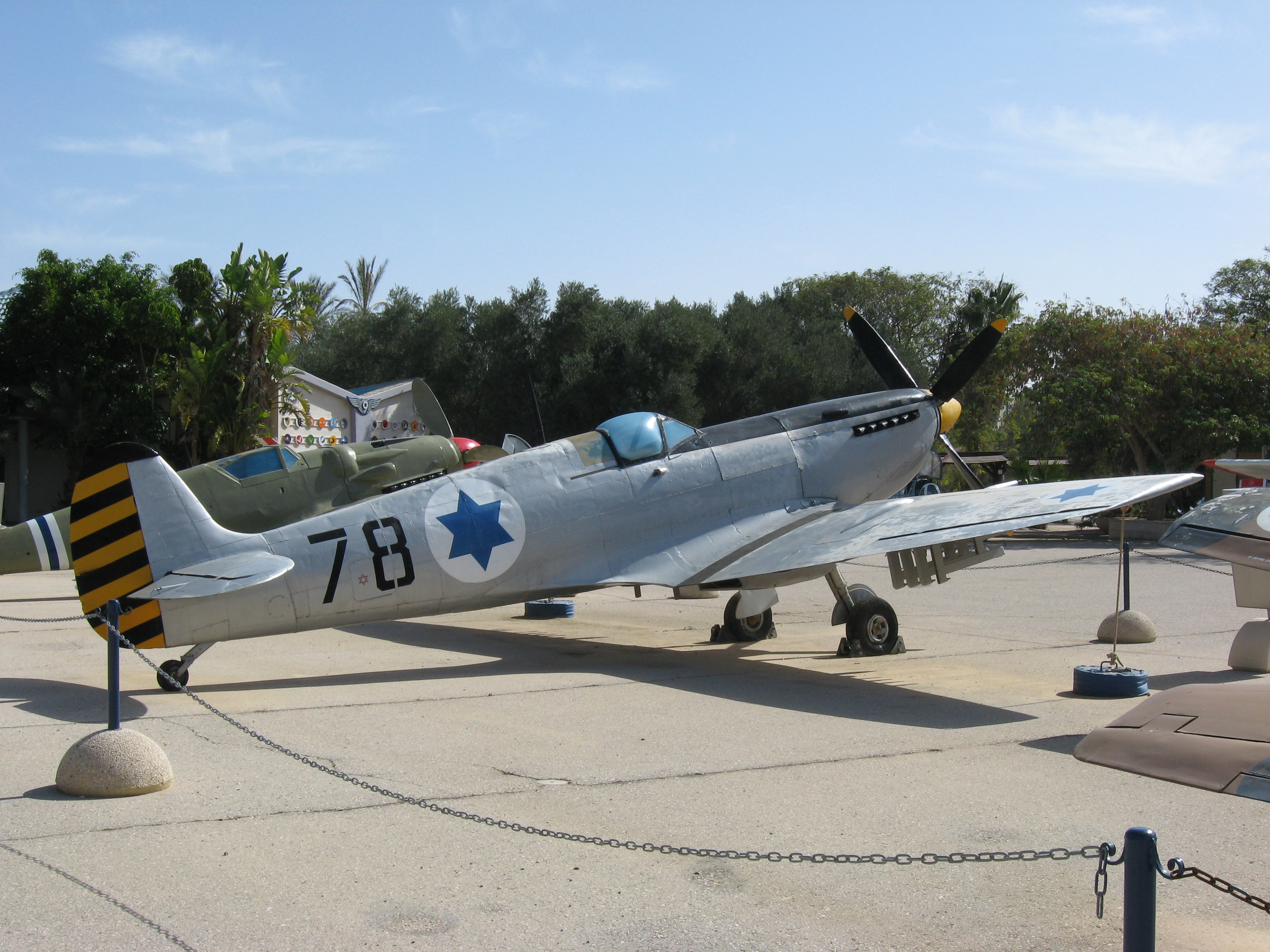
Spitfire IX at Israeli Air Force Museum in Hatzerim

Israel's first Spitfires were built from RAF Spitfire wrecks, parts recovered from downed Egyptian aircraft and RAF scrap. Israel bought 59 Spitfire LF IXC from Czechoslovakia in 1948 to address its lack of fighters. They joined 101 Squadron and enhanced the IAF's combat capability, although only 17 arrived in time to fight. During the October offensive, Spitfires escorted Beaufighters and B-17s to attack El Arish airbase and other targets. They also intercepted Egyptian Spitfires and Macchis, shooting down several.

In 1952 an additional 35 LF IXC/E aircraft were purchased from Italy, at which time the Spitfire in IDF service was known as the "Yorek". After a few years of operational use and major action during the 1948 Arab–Israeli War these Spitfires were sold to Burma.

Israeli Air Force

- 101 Squadron
- 105 Squadron
- 107 Squadron

=== Italy ===
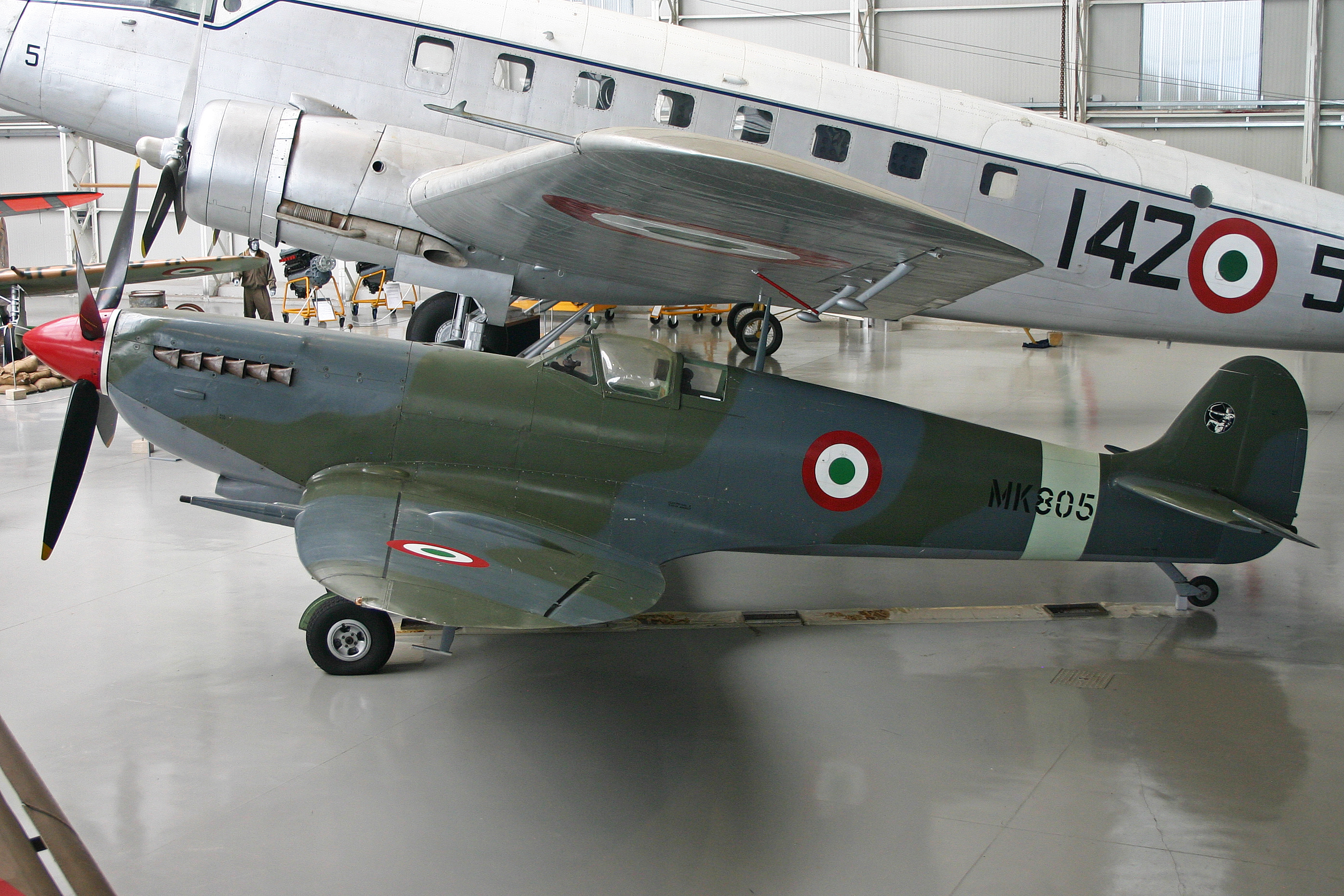
Supermarine Spitfire Mk IX operated by the Italian Air Force in the very last period of WWII

Italian Co-Belligerent Air Force operated 53 aircraft from 1943
Aeronautica Militare Italiana operated 137 aircraft from 1946 until 1952

=== Netherlands ===
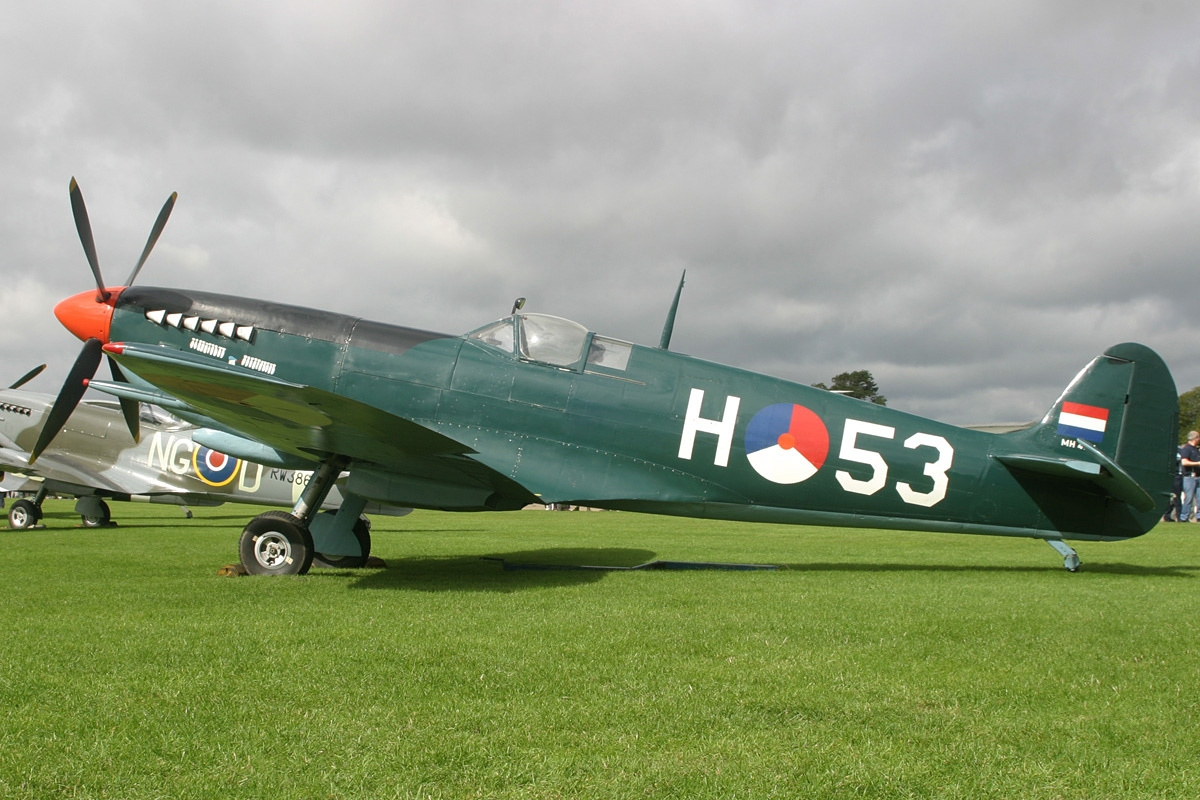
Ex 322 Squadron (RAF) & H-8 of the Royal Netherlands Air Force

Royal Netherlands Air Force

- No. 322 Squadron RAF
- No. 322 Squadron RNLAF – Postwar

=== New Zealand ===
Royal New Zealand Air Force

- No. 485 Squadron RNZAF
- No. 486 Squadron RNZAF (486 Squadron was officially equipped with the Hawker Tempest. In September 1945 they handed their aircraft over to ex-Spitfire unit No. 41 Squadron RAF. They then picked up some Spitfire XVIs from No. 416 Squadron RCAF and ferried them to England.)
- Air Force Heritage Flight of New Zealand

=== Norway ===
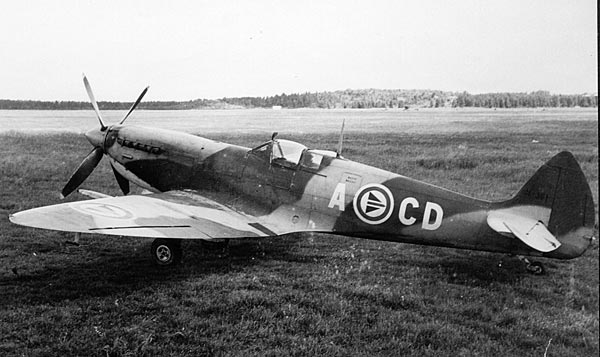
Norwegian Air Force Spitfire

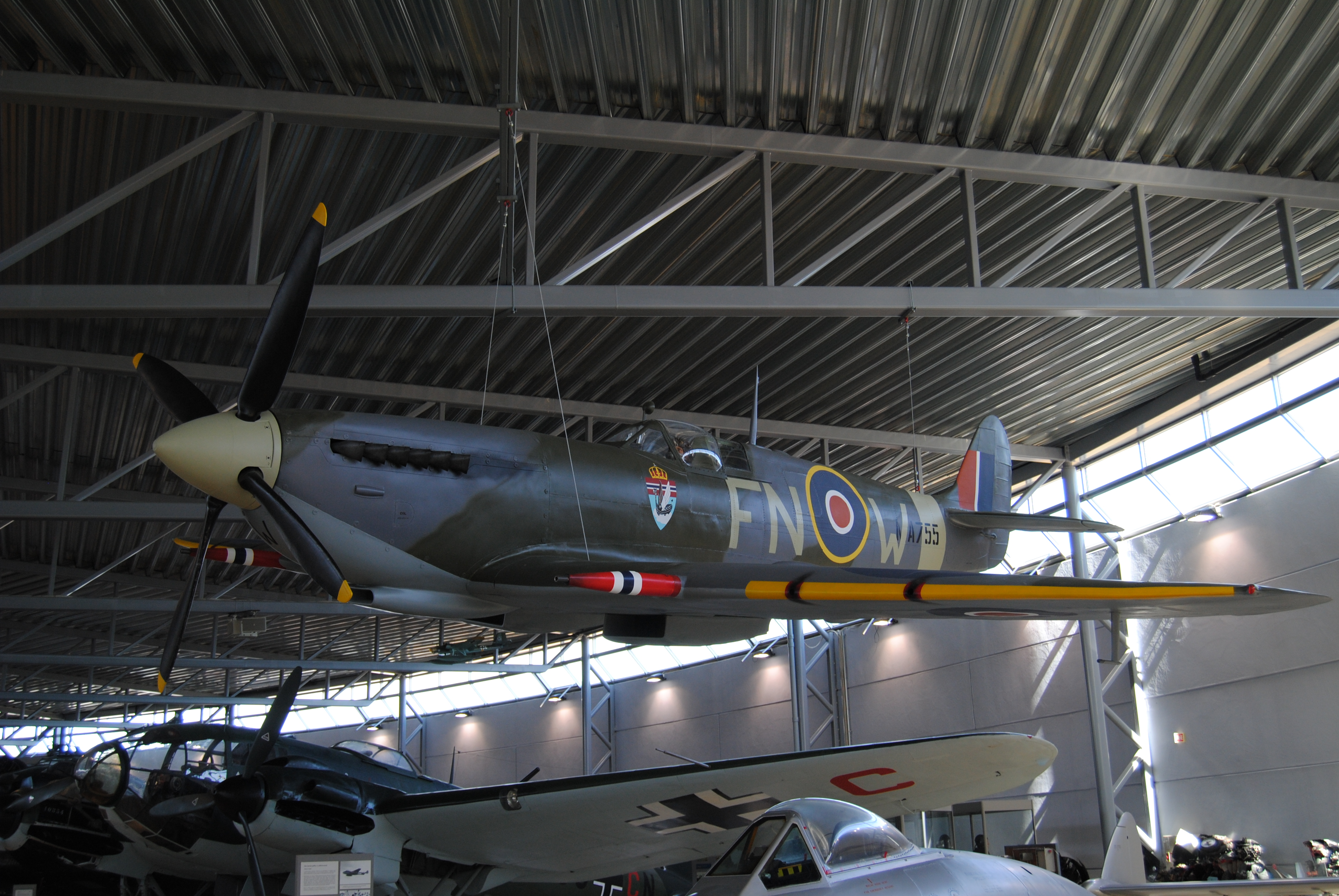
Norwegian Supermarine Spitfire displayed at the Norwegian Armed Forces Aircraft Collection

Royal Norwegian Air Force

- No. 331 Squadron RAF
- No. 332 Squadron RAF
- Photo Reconnaissance Wing No. 1

=== Pakistan ===
Royal Pakistan Air Force

=== Poland ===
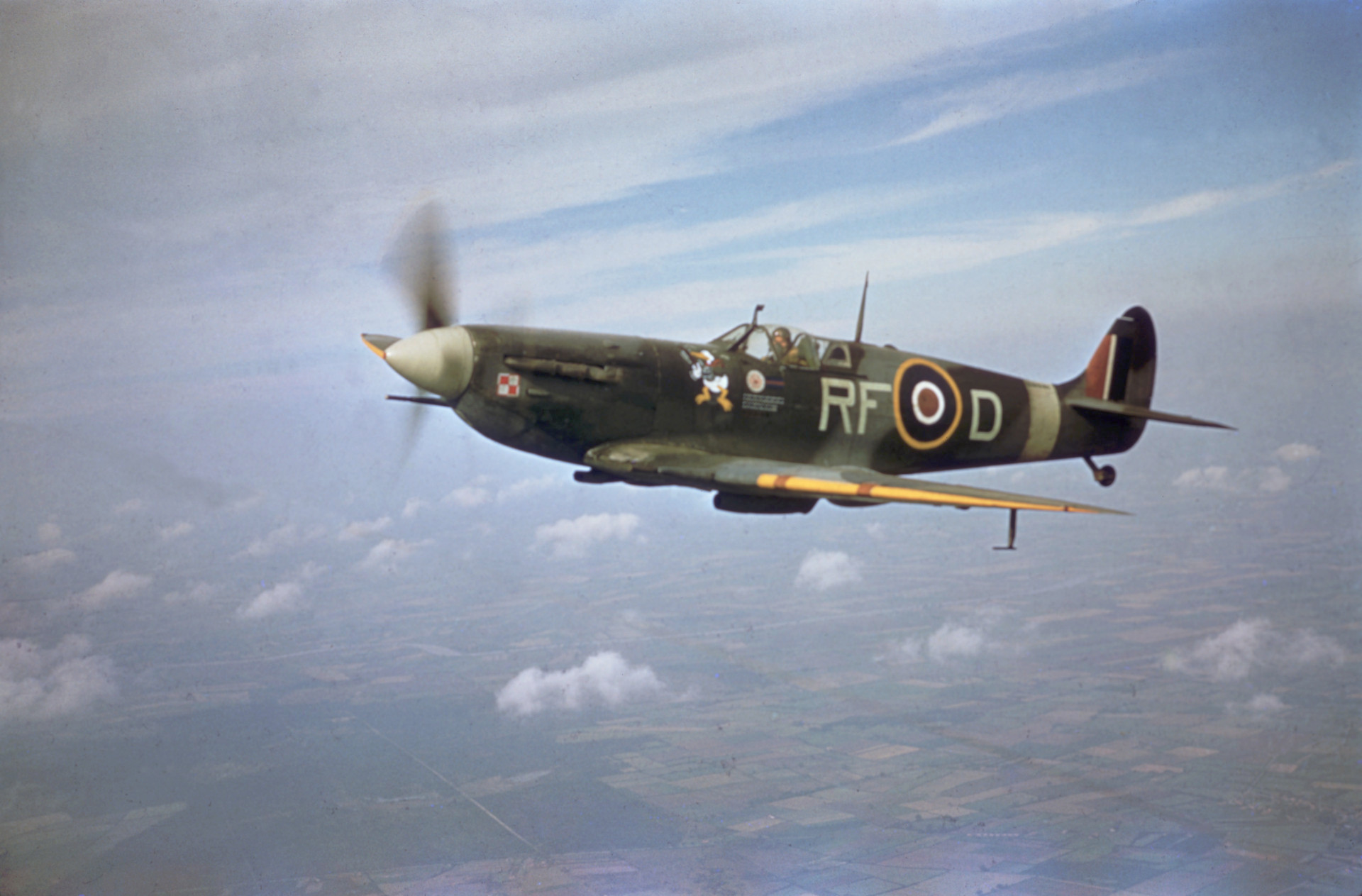
Polish Spitfire Mk V from the 303 Kościuszko Squadron flown by S/Ldr Zumbach

Polish Air Forces in exile in Great Britain

- 302 Dywizjon Myśliwski "Poznański"
- 303 Dywizjon Myśliwski "Warszawski im. Tadeusza Kościuszki"
- 306 Dywizjon Myśliwski "Toruński"
- 308 Dywizjon Myśliwski "Krakowski"
- 309 Dywizjon Współpracy Ziemi Czerwieńskiej
- 315 Dywizjon Myśliwski "Dębliński"
- 316 Dywizjon Myśliwski "Warszawski"
- 317 Dywizjon Myśliwski "Wileński"
- 318 Dywizjon Myśliwsko-Rozpoznawczy "Gdański"
- Polski Zespół Myśliwski (also known as Skalski's Circus)

=== Portugal ===
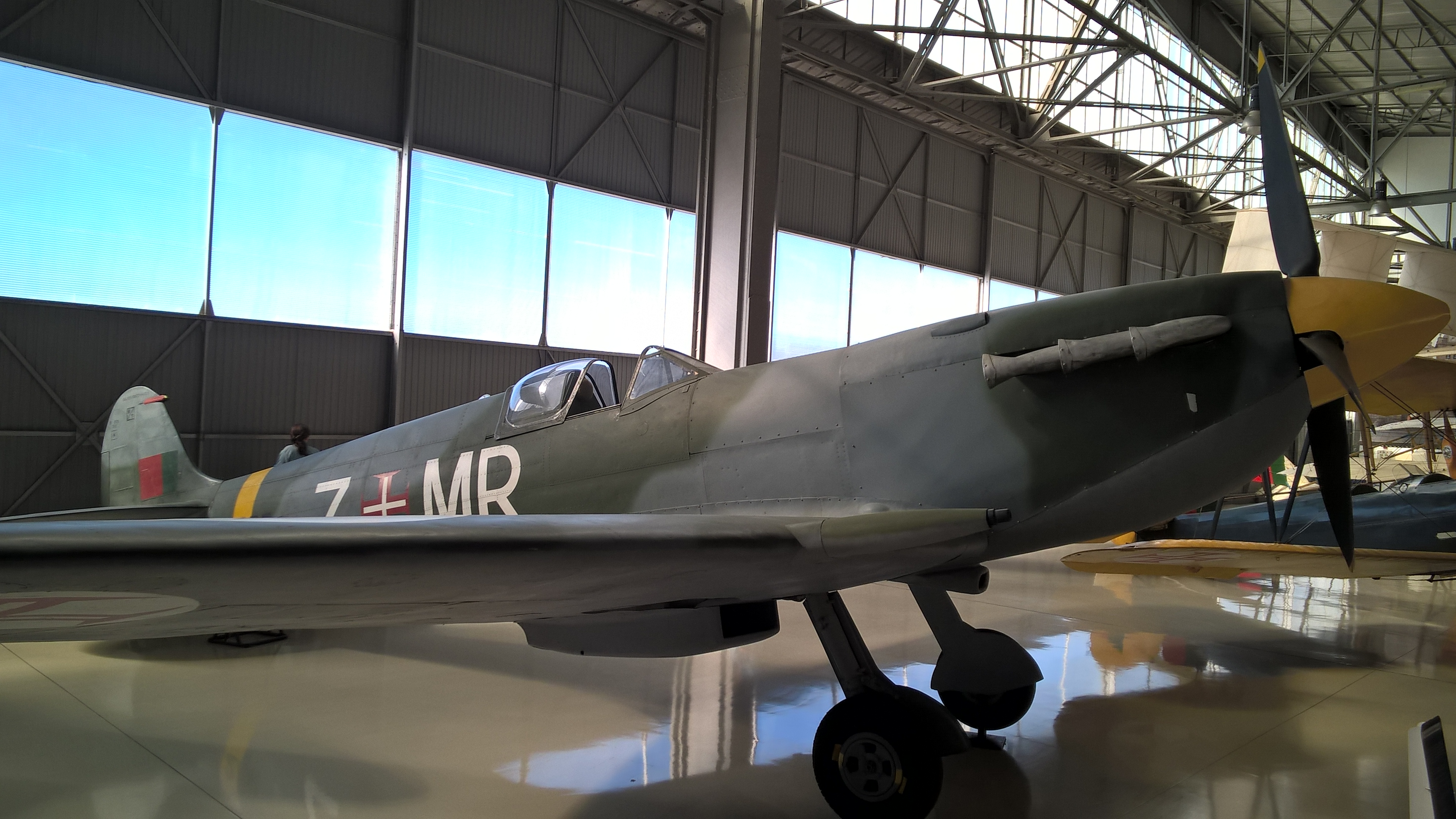
Supermarine Spitfire in the Museu do A

Portuguese Air Force

=== Southern Rhodesia ===
Southern Rhodesian Air Force

- No. 1 Squadron
- No. 2 Squadron

=== South Africa ===
South African Air Force

=== USSR ===
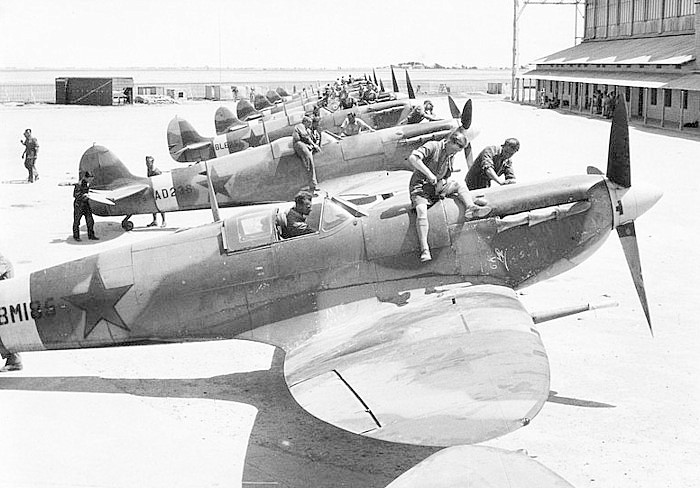
Line of the Spitfire VBs ready for delivery to the Soviet VVS

Britain answered to Stalin's request and sent 143 second-hand Spitfire Vb fighters to the Soviet Union. Due to these aircraft being misidentified frequently as Bf 109s by Soviet anti-aircraft artillery batteries and VVS fighters, a number of Spitfires were lost to "friendly fire". The Spitfire closely resembled Messerschmitt Bf 109 aircraft so Spitfire unit markings were made more prominent, however this did not appear to help (the 57th already displayed a yellow lightning bolt down the entire side of their fuselages) and the Mk. V was withdrawn from combat duties after only three months of service as part of defensive operations in the Kuban sector.

The Soviet Union was then supplied with some 1,200 Mk. IXs from 1943. Soviet pilots liked them but they did not suit Soviet combat tactics and the rough conditions at the forward airfields close to the front lines. Spitfires Mk. IXs were therefore assigned to air defense units, using the high altitude performance to intercept and pursue German bombers and reconnaissance aircraft. By 1944, the Spitfire IX was the main fighter used in this role and would remain so until 1947.

The Soviet Air Force modified some Spitfires as two-seat trainers and in the post-war period some were used as trainers.

Soviet Air Force

- 57th Guards Fighter Aviation Regiment (April–June 1943)
- 821st Fighter Aviation Regiment (April–June 1943)

=== Sweden ===
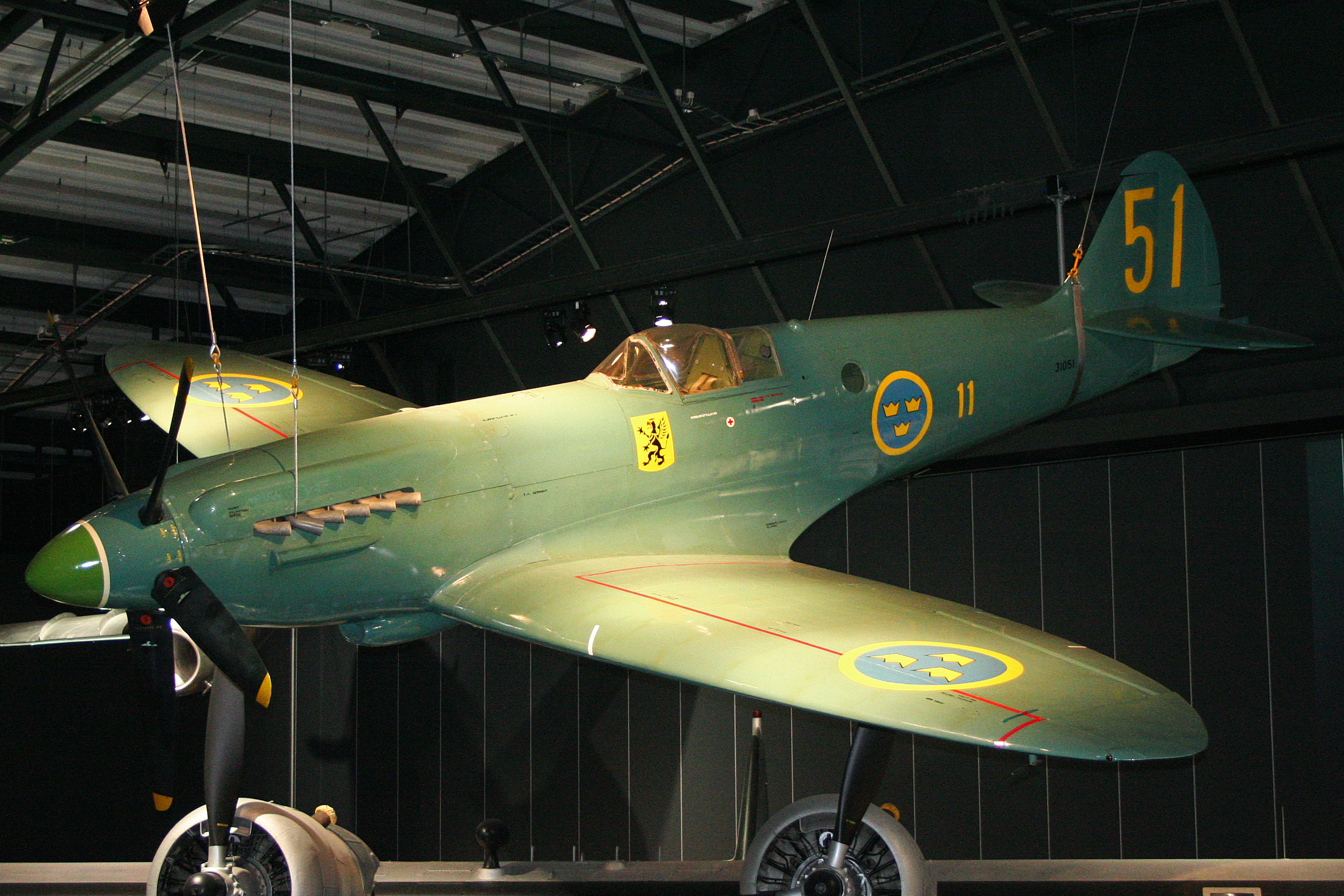
Supermarine Spitfire XIX at the Swedish Air Force Museum

Soon after the end of the Second World War, the Swedish Air Force equipped a photo reconnaissance wing, F 11 in Nyköping (just south of Stockholm), with 50 Mk XIXs, designated S 31. Several S 31 photographic missions in the late 1940s entailed flagrant violations of Soviet – and, at least once, Finnish – airspace in order to document activities at the air and naval installations in the Baltic and Kola regions. At that time, no Soviet fighter was able to reach the operational altitude of the S 31. No Swedish planes were lost during those clandestine operations. However, by the early 1950s, Soviet air defenses had become so effective that such practices had to cease. The S 31s were replaced by jet-powered SAAB S 29Cs in the mid-1950s.

Swedish Air Force

- F 11 photo reconnaissance wing

=== Syria ===
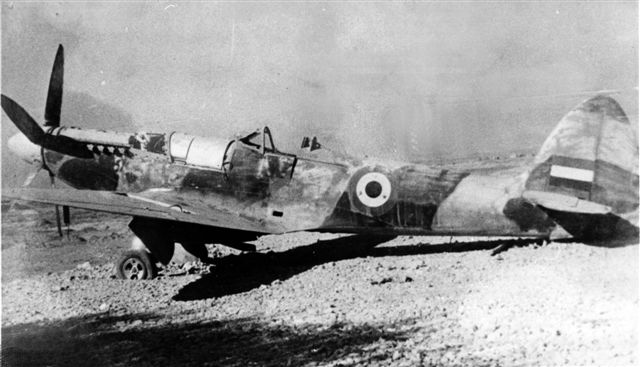
A derelict Syrian Spitfire at an unknown location.

Syrian Air Force

Syrian Government purchased 20 Spitfire Mk.22 in 1953. Later the Rhodesian Air Force sold seven Mk 22s. Most were retired and scrapped around 1960, but a few still were seen in airbases around 1967.

=== Thailand ===
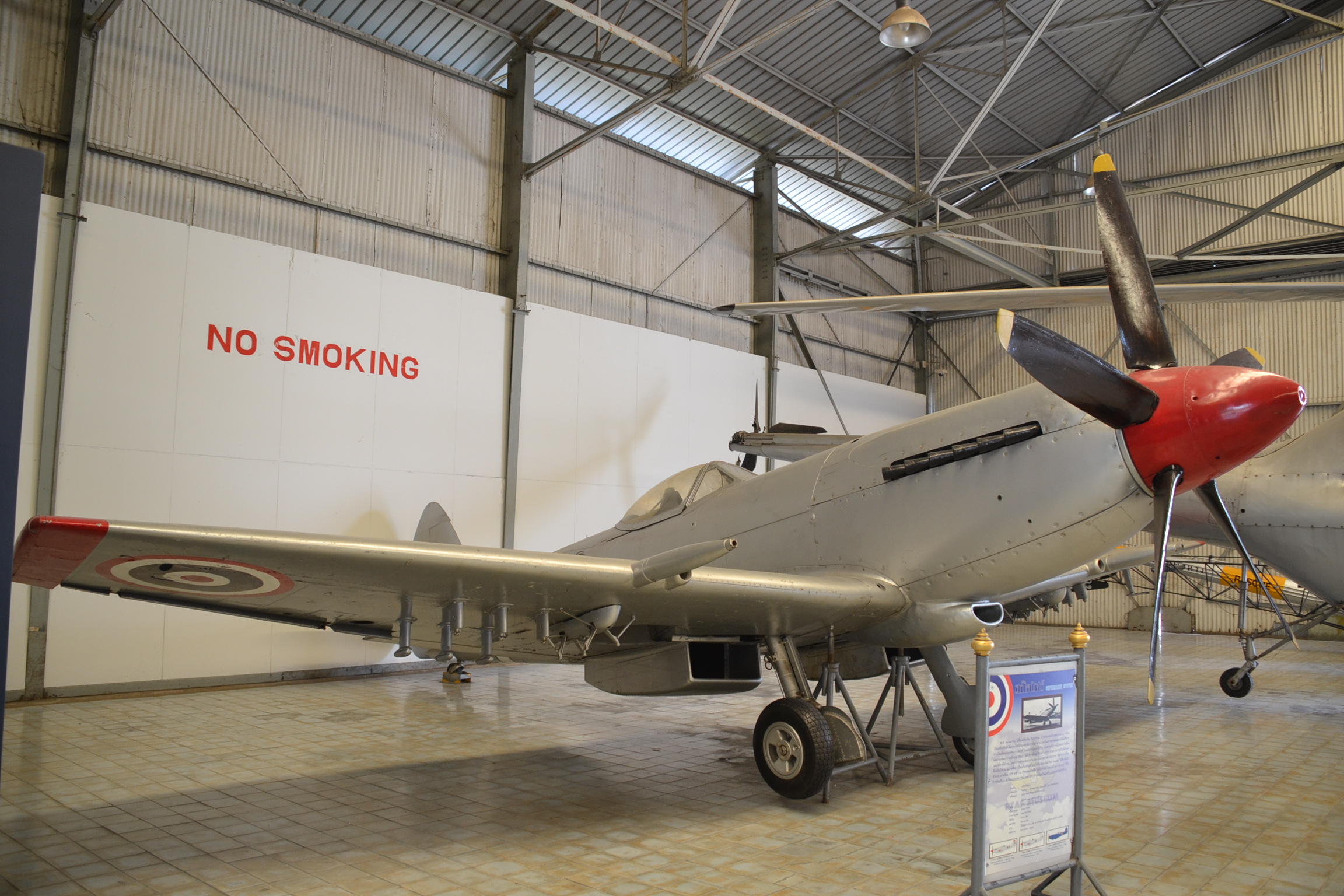
Supermarine Spitfire XIVe at the Royal Thai Air Force Museum

Royal Thai Air Force

- 1st Wing RTAF
  - 1st Squadron RTAF
- 4th Wing RTAF
  - 41st Squadron (earlier called 1st Squadron, today is 401st Squadron.)

=== Turkey ===
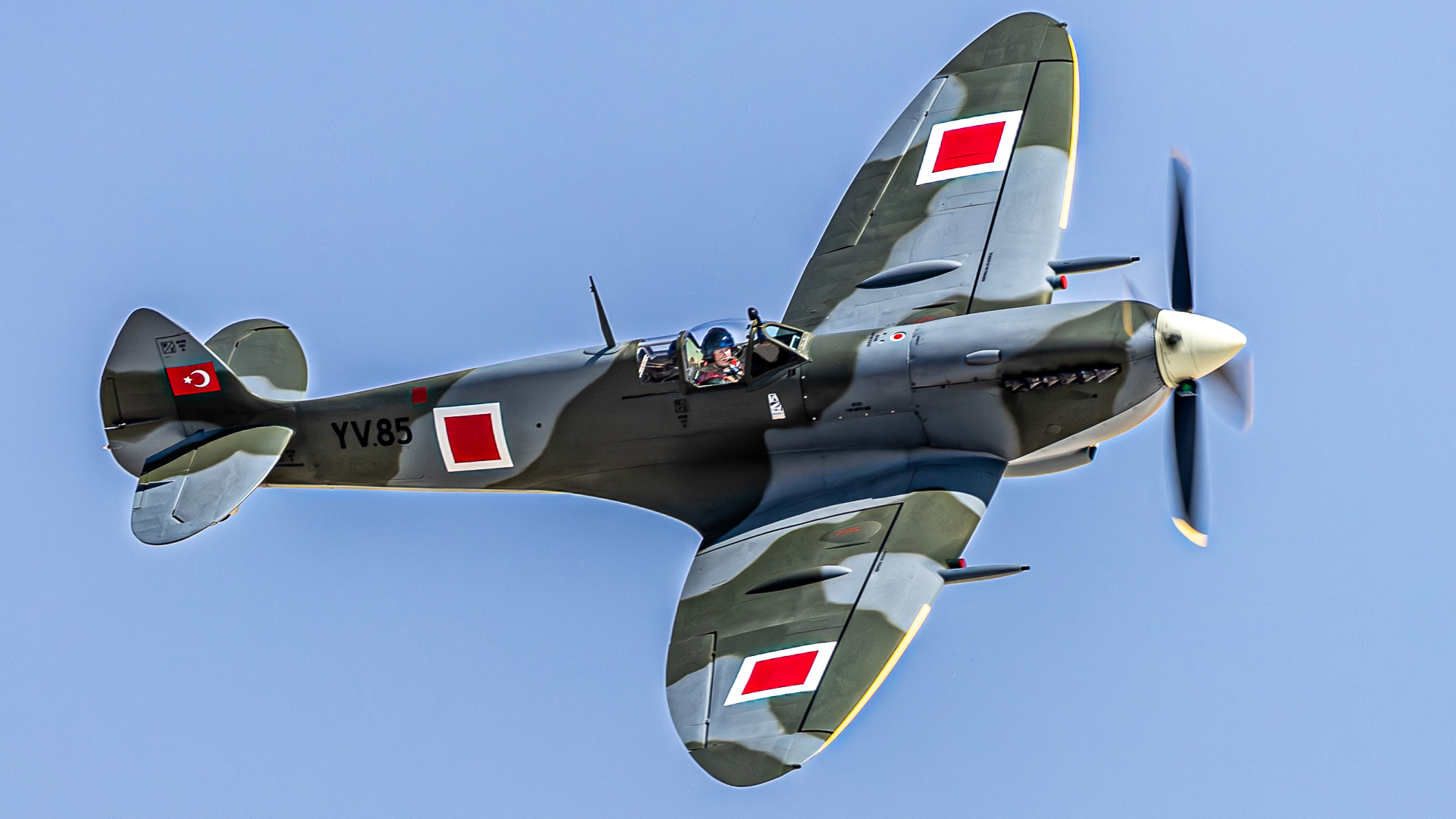
TE517 is at its first flight with Turkish Air Force colors

Turkish Air Force

=== United Kingdom ===
Royal Air Force

- No. 1 Squadron RAF
- No. 2 Squadron RAF
- No. 4 Squadron RAF
- No. 5 Squadron RAF
- No. 6 Squadron RAF
- No. 11 Squadron RAF
- No. 16 Squadron RAF
- No. 17 Squadron RAF
- No. 19 Squadron RAF
- No. 20 Squadron RAF
- No. 26 Squadron RAF
- No. 28 Squadron RAF
- No. 32 Squadron RAF
- No. 33 Squadron RAF
- No. 34 Squadron RAF
- No. 41 Squadron RAF
- No. 43 Squadron RAF
- No. 54 Squadron RAF
- No. 56 Squadron RAF
- No. 58 Squadron RAF
- No. 60 Squadron RAF
- No. 63 Squadron RAF
- No. 64 Squadron RAF
- No. 65 Squadron RAF
- No. 66 Squadron RAF
- No. 67 Squadron RAF
- No. 69 Squadron RAF
- No. 71 Squadron RAF
- No. 72 Squadron RAF
- No. 73 Squadron RAF
- No. 74 Squadron RAF
- No. 80 Squadron RAF
- No. 81 Squadron RAF
- No. 82 Squadron RAF
- No. 87 Squadron RAF
- No. 91 Squadron RAF
- No. 92 Squadron RAF
- No. 93 Squadron RAF
- No. 94 Squadron RAF
- No. 111 Squadron RAF
- No. 118 Squadron RAF
- No. 121 Squadron RAF
- No. 122 Squadron RAF
- No. 123 Squadron RAF
- No. 124 Squadron RAF
- No. 126 Squadron RAF
- No. 127 Squadron RAF
- No. 129 Squadron RAF
- No. 130 Squadron RAF
- No. 131 Squadron RAF
- No. 132 Squadron RAF
- No. 133 Squadron RAF
- No. 134 Squadron RAF
- No. 136 Squadron RAF
- No. 137 Squadron RAF
- No. 140 Squadron RAF
- No. 145 Squadron RAF
- No. 152 Squadron RAF
- No. 153 Squadron RAF
- No. 154 Squadron RAF
- No. 155 Squadron RAF
- No. 164 Squadron RAF
- No. 165 Squadron RAF
- No. 167 Squadron RAF
- No. 183 Squadron RAF
- No. 184 Squadron RAF
- No. 185 Squadron RAF
- No. 186 Squadron RAF
- No. 208 Squadron RAF
- No. 213 Squadron RAF
- No. 222 Squadron RAF
- No. 225 Squadron RAF
- No. 229 Squadron RAF
- No. 232 Squadron RAF
- No. 234 Squadron RAF
- No. 237 Squadron RAF
- No. 238 Squadron RAF
- No. 241 Squadron RAF
- No. 242 Squadron RAF
- No. 243 Squadron RAF
- No. 249 Squadron RAF
- No. 253 Squadron RAF
- No. 256 Squadron RAF
- No. 257 Squadron RAF
- No. 266 Squadron RAF
- No. 268 Squadron RAF
- No. 269 Squadron RAF
- No. 273 Squadron RAF
- No. 274 Squadron RAF
- No. 275 Squadron RAF
- No. 276 Squadron RAF
- No. 277 Squadron RAF
- No. 278 Squadron RAF
- No. 283 Squadron RAF
- No. 287 Squadron RAF
- No. 288 Squadron RAF
- No. 289 Squadron RAF
- No. 290 Squadron RAF
- No. 501 Squadron RAF
- No. 502 Squadron RAF
- No. 504 Squadron RAF
- No. 518 Squadron RAF
- No. 519 Squadron RAF
- No. 520 Squadron RAF
- No. 521 Squadron RAF
- No. 527 Squadron RAF
- No. 541 Squadron RAF
- No. 542 Squadron RAF
- No. 543 Squadron RAF
- No. 544 Squadron RAF
- No. 545 Squadron RAF
- No. 548 Squadron RAF
- No. 549 Squadron RAF
- No. 567 Squadron RAF
- No. 577 Squadron RAF
- No. 587 Squadron RAF
- No. 595 Squadron RAF
- No. 600 Squadron RAF
- No. 601 Squadron RAF
- No. 602 Squadron RAF
- No. 603 Squadron RAF
- No. 604 Squadron RAF
- No. 607 Squadron RAF
- No. 608 Squadron RAF
- No. 609 Squadron RAF
- No. 610 Squadron RAF
- No. 611 Squadron RAF
- No. 612 Squadron RAF
- No. 613 Squadron RAF
- No. 614 Squadron RAF
- No. 615 Squadron RAF
- No. 616 Squadron RAF
- No. 631 Squadron RAF
- No. 667 Squadron RAF
- No. 680 Squadron RAF
- No. 681 Squadron RAF
- No. 682 Squadron RAF
- No. 683 Squadron RAF
- No. 684 Squadron RAF
- No. 691 Squadron RAF
- No. 695 Squadron RAF
- No. 1435 Squadron RAF
- Battle of Britain Memorial Flight

The first Spitfire entered service with the No. 19 Squadron RAF at Duxford on 4 Aug 1938. In September 1939 eleven Spitfire squadrons were in service with the RAF, which had requested to buy 2,000. During the Battle of Britain nineteen Spitfire squadrons were claimed 521 German aircraft.

Fleet Air Arm

Royal Navy quickly realized it did not have a capable carrier fighter to deal with modern German fighters. RAF fighters were converted as carrier fighters and the first carrier landing of modified RAF Spitfire for carrier operations was done on 10 Jan 1942. Seafire IIC variant followed, a purpose-built carrier fighter.

Seafire fighters were operated from British carriers and played a vital role in Task Force 57's mission to protect the southern flank during the Okinawa campaign.

=== United States ===
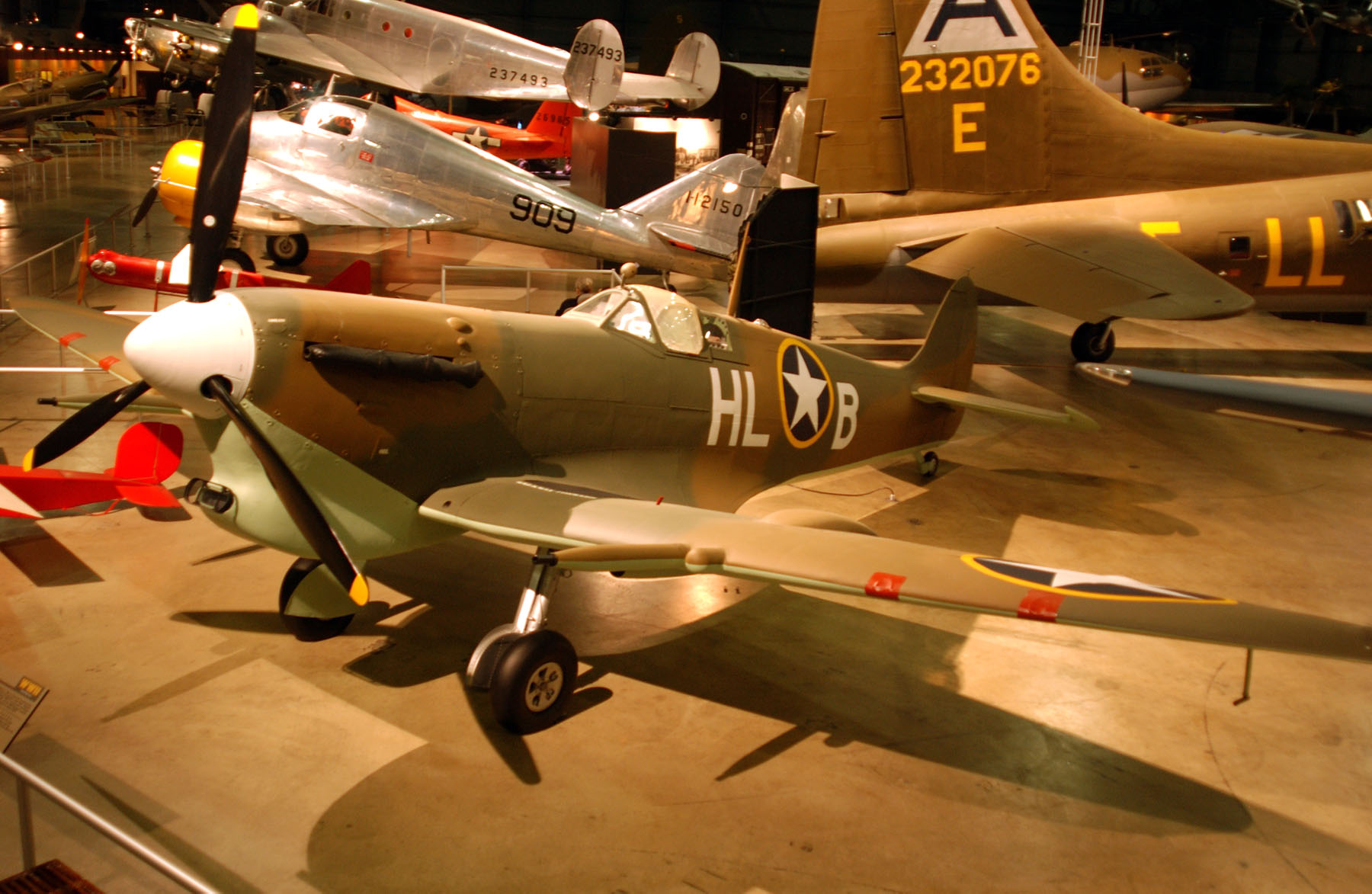
American Spitfire

The Spitfire was one of only a few foreign aircraft to see service with the USAAF, equipping four groups in England and the Mediterranean. Spitfires were briefly flown by the US Navy after the Normandy landings to support cruisers and battleships bombarding land targets. Around 600 Spitfires in different version served in the U.S. Army Air Force and Navy.

United States Army Air Forces.

==== Fighter Groups ====
Each Fighter group was composed of three squadrons of 16 fighters. Initially USAAF used Mk. V and in August 1943 MTO units received Mk. IX and Mk.VIII planes.

- 4th Fighter Group. Volunteer pilots of the three Eagle squadrons transferred in September 1942 to USAAF to create this FG. 4th FG fought escorting bombers and dog-fighting Luftwaffe fighters over France and the English Channel. In early 1943 it began transition to P-47 Thunderbolts.
  - 334th Fighter Squadron 1941–1943. Formerly RAF 71 Squadron.
  - 335th Fighter Squadron 1942–43. Formerly RAF 121 Squadron.
  - 336th Fighter Squadron 1942–43. Formerly RAF 133 Squadron.
- 31st Fighter Group. Fought in Dieppe, North Africa and Italy. In March 1944 P-51B Mustangs started to replace Spitfire IX.
  - 307th Fighter Squadron
  - 308th Fighter Squadron
  - 309th Fighter Squadron
- 52d Fighter Group. Fought in North Africa and Italy. It was assigned to protect the allied fleet from air attacks off Anzio beachhead. In April 1944 P-51B Mustangs started to replace Spitfire IX.
  - 2nd Fighter Squadron
  - 4th Fighter Squadron
  - 5th Fighter Squadron

==== Photo Recce Groups ====
Alongside American-built F-5 Lightning and F-6 Mustang reconnaissance planes some Spitfire PR.XI planes were operated in Europe and the Mediterranean.

- 7th Photographic Reconnaissance Group.
  - 13th Photographic Reconnaissance Squadron 1943
  - 14th Photographic Reconnaissance Squadron 1943–1945
  - 22nd Reconnaissance Squadron 1943–1945
- 68th Photographic Reconnaissance Group. North Africa and the Mediterranean until mid-1944.
  - 16th Reconnaissance Squadron 1942–1944
  - 111st Reconnaissance Squadron 1942–1944

United States Navy

- Cruiser Scouting Squadron Seven (VCS-7)

In May 1944 VCS-7 Cruiser Support Squadron trained to fly Spitfire VB's instead of their floatplanes, extremely vulnerable to flak guns and enemy fighters to be found in D-Day. They were based on Royal Naval Air Station Lee-on-Solent. VCS-7 flew around 200 sorties with Spitfires, from D-Day landings to the capture of the port of Cherbourg, which made naval fire support no longer needed.

=== Yugoslavia ===
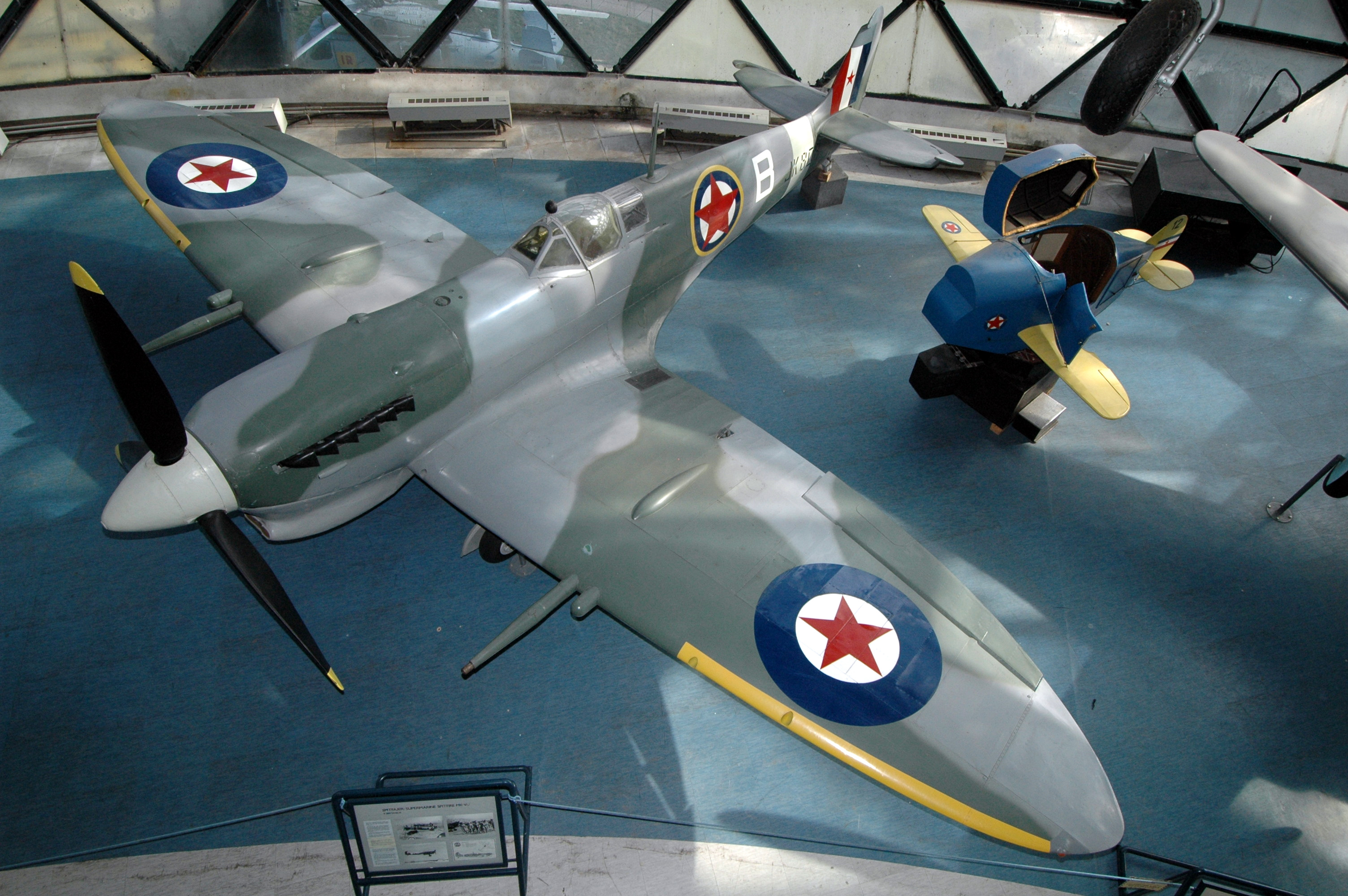
Spitfire Mk. VC Trop in Belgrade Aviation Museum

Yugoslav Squadrons in the RAF

- No. 352 Squadron RAF

SFR Yugoslav Air Force

- 1st Fighter Regiment (1945)
- Reconnaissance Aviation Regiment (1947–1948)
- 103rd Reconnaissance Aviation Regiment (1948–1951)
- Liaison Squadron of 3rd Aviation Corps (1950–1952)

During the war exiled Yugoslavian pilots manned Spitfire Mk. VB's of RAF 352 Squadron that conducted combat missions over Italy and Yugoslavia. This was part of RAF Balkan Air Force which was created in 1944 to support Yugoslav partisans. After the war Yugoslav Air Force operated 18 Mk. VC until 1954, as Reconnaissance planes.
