= Ansar Ahmad =

Ansar Ahmad may refer to:

- Ansar Ahmad (Indian politician) (born 1957), member of the Uttar Pradesh Legislative Assembly
- Ansar Ahmad (Indonesian politician) (born 1964), former regent of Bintan Regency (2005–2015) and member of the People's Representative Council (2019–2020), governor-elect of Riau Islands
- Ansar Ahmed, Bangladeshi politician
