= Comilla-7 =

Constituency of Bangladesh's Jatiya Sangsad

Coordinates: 23.49°N 91.01°E

- Constituency for the Jatiya Sangsad
- District: Comilla District
- Division: Chittagong Division
- Electorate: 329,166 (2026)

Current constituency
- Created: 1973
- Party: Independent
- Member: Atikul Alam Shawon
- ← 254 Comilla-6 256 Comilla-8 →

Comilla-7 is a constituency represented in the Jatiya Sangsad (National Parliament) of Bangladesh since 2026 by independent politician Atikul Alam Shawon.

== Boundaries ==
The constituency encompasses Chandina Upazila.

== History ==
The constituency was created for the first general elections in newly independent Bangladesh, held in 1973.

Ahead of the 2008 general election, the Election Commission redrew constituency boundaries to reflect population changes revealed by the 2001 Bangladesh census. The 2008 redistricting altered the boundaries of the constituency.

Ahead of the 2014 general election, the Election Commission reduced the boundaries of the constituency. Previously it had also included one union parishad of Barura Upazila:Chitadda.

== Members of Parliament ==
Election	Member	Party
1973	A. W. M. Abdul Haque	Awami League
1979	Matruza Hossain Mollah	Bangladesh Nationalist Party
1986	Mohammad A. Akim	Jatiya Party
1988	Mahbubur Rahman	
1991	AKM Abu Taher	Bangladesh Nationalist Party
Jun 1996	Abdul Hakim	Awami League
2001	AKM Abu Taher	Bangladesh Nationalist Party
2004 by-election	Zakaria Taher Sumon	Bangladesh Nationalist Party
2008	Ali Ashraf	Awami League
2021 by-election	Pran Gopal Datta	Awami League
2026	Atikul Alam Shawon	Independent

== Elections ==
=== Elections in the 2020s ===
General election 2026: Comilla-7
Party	Candidate	Votes	%	±%
Independent	Atikul Alam Shawon	90,819	49.83	+49.73
BNP	Redwan Ahmed	42,894	23.53	−20.17
Khelafat Majlis	Soliman Khan	26,319	14.44	+14.14
Majority		47,925	26.30	+23.00
Turnout		186,120	56.54	−29.46
Registered electors		329,166		
Independent gain from AL				

=== Elections in the 2010s ===
Ali Ashraf was re-elected unopposed in the 2014 general election after opposition parties withdrew their candidacies in a boycott of the election.

General Election 2008: Comilla-7
Party	Candidate	Votes	%	±%
AL	Ali Ashraf	79,440	46.9	+8.4
BNP	Khorshed Alam	73,933	43.7	−14.9
LDP	Redwan Ahmed	14,276	8.4	N/A
IAB	Md. Abul Kalam	762	0.5	N/A
BKM	Wali Ullah	504	0.3	N/A
JSD	Md Mohiuddin Mia	191	0.1	N/A
Independent	Mehnaz Rashid Khondakar	159	0.1	N/A
Majority		5,507	3.3	−16.8
Turnout		169,265	86.0	+11.6
AL gain from BNP				

AKM Abu Taher died in September 2004. Zakaria Taher Sumon, his son, was elected in a December by-election.

General Election 2001: Comilla-7
Party	Candidate	Votes	%	±%
BNP	AKM Abu Taher	89,623	58.6	+21.6
AL	Abdul Hakim	58,898	38.5	−1.8
IJOF	Nurul Islam Milon	3,964	2.6	N/A
Independent	Md. Abul Hasem	288	0.2	N/A
Independent	Md. Mohsin Kabir Bhuiya	85	0.1	N/A
Independent	Md. Farhad Hossain	62	0.0	N/A
Majority		30,725	20.1	+16.8
Turnout		152,920	74.4	+1.8
BNP gain from AL				

=== Elections in the 1990s ===
General Election June 1996: Comilla-7
Party	Candidate	Votes	%	±%
AL	Abdul Hakim	44,855	40.3	+3.0
BNP	AKM Abu Taher	41,224	37.0	−1.4
JP(E)	Nurul Islam Milon	20,751	18.6	−2.8
Jamaat	Md. Delowar Hossain	2,797	2.5	N/A
BIF	M. A. Latif	628	0.6	+0.4
Zaker Party	Md. Ali Asgor	411	0.4	+0.3
IOJ	Yakub Sharafati	365	0.3	N/A
Independent	Arifur Rahman Mojumder	144	0.1	N/A
Bangladesh Muslim League (Jamir Ali)	Khandarkar Jillur Rahman	124	0.1	N/A
Gano Forum	Abu Taher	92	0.1	N/A
Majority		3,631	3.3	+2.2
Turnout		111,391	72.6	+19.8
AL gain from BNP				

General Election 1991: Comilla-7
Party	Candidate	Votes	%	±%
BNP	AKM Abu Taher	36,068	38.4	
AL	Abdul Hakim	35,059	37.3	
JP(E)	Md. Nurul Islam	20,053	21.4	
WPB	Nazim Ali	587	0.6	
NAP (Muzaffar)	Abdul Gaffar	545	0.6	
Jatiya Samajtantrik Dal-JSD	Shahid Ullah	447	0.5	
Bangladesh Muslim League (Kader)	Kazi Nazmul Sayadat	422	0.4	
Independent	Kasem Shafi Ullah	412	0.4	
BIF	Khorshed Alam	208	0.2	
Zaker Party	Abu Taher	98	0.1	
Majority		1,009	1.1	
Turnout		93,899	52.8	
BNP gain from				
