= Akbar Hossain (politician) =

Bangladeshi politician (1941–2006)

- আকবর হোসেন

Minister for Shipping
- In office 10 October 2001 – 25 June 2006
- Preceded by: A. S. M. Abdur Rab
- Succeeded by: Shajahan Khan

Minister for the Environment and Forests
- In office 13 September 1993 – 19 March 1996
- Preceded by: Abdullah Al Noman
- Succeeded by: Abdullah Al Noman

Minister for Petroleum and Mineral Resources
- In office 19 October 1978 – 15 April 1979
- Preceded by: A.Z.M. Enayetullah Khan
- Succeeded by: Nurul Huq

Member of Parliament for Comilla-8
- In office 5 March 1991 – 27 October 2006
- Preceded by: Ansar Ahmed
- Succeeded by: Nasimul Alam Chowdhury

Personal details
- Born: 2 November 1941 Comilla, Bengal Presidency, British India
- Died: 25 June 2006 (aged 64) Dhaka, Bangladesh
- Party: Bangladesh Nationalist Party
- Spouse: Sultana Akbar
- Education: University of Dhaka
- Awards: Bir Protik

Military service
- Allegiance: Pakistan (before 1971); Bangladesh
- Branch/service: Pakistan Army; Bangladesh Army
- Years of service: 1966–1973
- Rank: Lieutenant Colonel
- Unit: Baloch Regiment (before 1971); East Bengal Regiment
- Commands: Deputy Commander of K Force; Deputy Commander of Z Force; CO of 14th East Bengal Regiment
- Battles/wars: Bangladesh Liberation War

Bir Protik Akbar Hossain (18 January 1941 – 25 June 2006) was a Bangladeshi politician of the Bangladesh National Party. He served as the Minister for Shipping, Minister for the Environment and Forests, and Minister for Petroleum and Mineral Resources.

== Biography ==
Hossain was born in Kashari Patty on 18 January 1941, in Comilla District.

== Military career ==
Hossain joined the army at Kakul Military Academy in Pakistan in May 1966. After his commission, he was posted to the 31 Baluch Regiment. While serving, he studied for his bachelor's at the University of Dhaka, receiving the degree in 1969.

Hossain joined the War of Independence in 1971, first under Khaled Musharraf and then with the Z Force headed by Ziaur Rahman. He was decorated for gallantry, receiving the 'Bir Protik' for his role in the war. After independence was won, he took voluntary retirement from the Bangladesh Army at the end of December 1973, after attaining the rank of lieutenant colonel.

== Political career ==
Hossain then became actively involved in politics and helped form the United People's Party (UPP) in January 1974. He went on to become the vice-president of the UPP. In 1977, the UPP merged with the Jatiyatabadi Front. Hossain left and joined the Bangladesh National Party (BNP) and played a crucial role in its founding. He was first made special secretary and then held the position of joint secretary general and was one of the vice-presidents of the BNP up until his death.

In 1978, Hossain was appointed as the minister for petroleum and mineral resources under the government of President Ziaur Rahman. Hossain was first elected a member of the Bangladesh Parliament in 1979. He represented the Comilla 8th constituency in the 2nd Jatiyo Sangshad elections, a seat he was re-elected to four times. During the military dictatorship of General Hossain Mohammad Ershad, Hossain was jailed on five occasions for coming into conflict with the regime. After the ending of the military dictatorship and the election of Khaleda Zia, the country's first female prime minister, Hossain returned to government as Minister for the Environment and Forests in October 1993.

In October 2001, Hossain was appointed Minister for Shipping after the BNP-led four-party alliance won the 8th Jatiyo Sangshad elections, with a two-thirds majority and Khaleda Zia became the Prime Minister of Bangladesh for the third time. He died in Dhaka in 2006 following a massive heart attack.
