= Zakaria Taher Sumon =

Bangladeshi politician

Zakaria Taher
- জাকারিয়া তাহের
- Sumon in 2026

Minister of Housing and Public Works
- Incumbent
- Assumed office 17 February 2026
- Prime Minister: Tarique Rahman
- Preceded by: Adilur Rahman Khan

Member of Parliament
- Incumbent
- Assumed office 17 February 2026
- Preceded by: A. Z. M. Shafiuddin Shamim
- Constituency: Comilla-8
- In office 19 December 2004 – 27 October 2006
- Preceded by: Abu Taher
- Succeeded by: Ali Ashraf
- Constituency: Comilla-7

Personal details
- Born: Zakaria Taher Sumon; 15 December 1965 (age 60) Comilla District, East Pakistan
- Party: Bangladesh Nationalist Party

Zakaria Taher (born 15 December 1965) is a Bangladesh Nationalist Party politician and the incumbent Jatiya Sangsad member representing the Cumilla-8 constituency and the incumbent minister of housing and public works since February 2026.

== Career ==
Sumon was elected to parliament from Cumilla-7 as a Bangladesh Nationalist Party candidate in 2004 by election which was called following the death of the then incumbent Abu Taher, and also Sumon's father.

Sumon's brother, Abu Naser Mohammad Yeahea, who had recently passed away on the 31 December 2024, had provided an office to former Prime Minister Khaleda Zia to use as the office of the chairperson of the Bangladesh Nationalist Party in Gulshan in October 2008.
