= Nurul Islam Milon =

Bangladeshi politician

- নূরুল ইসলাম মিলন

Member of 10th Parliament

Member of Parliament for Comilla-8
- In office 2014–2018
- Succeeded by: Nasimul Alam Chowdhury

Personal details
- Born: 20 July 1949 (age 76)
- Party: Jatiya Party
- Education: B.Sc (Honours), M.Sc (Physics), Ph.d (D.U)
- Occupation: Teaching (University) Professor of Physics

Nurul Islam Milon (Bengali: নূরুল ইসলাম মিলন) is a Bangladeshi politician and a former member of parliament from Comilla-8.

== Early life ==
Milon was born on 20 July 1949. He did his undergraduate, graduate degree, and PhD in physics at the University of Dhaka.

== Career ==
Milon was elected to parliament from Comilla-8 as a Jatiya Party candidate in 2014 and ended his term in 2018.

Milon lost the re-election from Comilla-8 as a Jatiya Party candidate on 30 December 2018 to Nasimul Alam Chowdhury of the Awami League. He had received 1,411 votes and came a distant third while Chowdhury received 188,659 votes.
