= Comilla-8 =

Constituency of Bangladesh's Jatiya Sangsad

Coordinates: 23.37°N 91.05°E

- Constituency for the Jatiya Sangsad
- District: Comilla District
- Division: Chittagong Division
- Electorate: 380,833 (2026)

Current constituency
- Created: 1973
- Party: Bangladesh Nationalist Party
- Member: Zakaria Taher Sumon
- ← 255 Comilla-7 258 Comilla-9 →

Comilla-8 is a constituency represented in the Jatiya Sangsad (National Parliament) of Bangladesh since 2026 by Zakaria Taher Sumon of the Bangladesh Nationalist Party.

== Boundaries ==
The constituency encompasses Barura Upazila.

== History ==
The constituency was created for the first general elections in newly independent Bangladesh, held in 1973.

Ahead of the 2014 general election, the Election Commission reduced the boundaries of the constituency. Previously it had included Comilla Dakshin Municipality and five union parishads of Comilla Sadar Dakshin Upazila: Bara Para, Bijoypur, Chouara, Purba Jorekaran, and Paschim Jorekaran, but had excluded one union parishad of Barura Upazila: Chitadda.

== Members of Parliament ==
Election	Member	Party
1973	Muzaffar Ali	Awami League
1979	Abdur Rashid	Jatiya Samajtantrik Dal
1986	Ansar Ahmed	Jatiya Party
1991	Akbar Hossain	Bangladesh Nationalist Party
Jun 1996	Akbar Hossain	Bangladesh Nationalist Party
2001	Akbar Hossain	Bangladesh Nationalist Party
2008	Nasimul Alam Chowdhury	Awami League
2014	Nurul Islam Milon	Jatiya Party (Ershad)
2018	Nasimul Alam Chowdhury	Awami League
2024	A.Z.M. Shafiuddin Shamim	Awami League
2026	Zakaria Taher Sumon	Bangladesh Nationalist Party

== Elections ==
=== Elections in the 2020s ===
General Election 2026: Comilla-8
Party	Candidate	Votes	%	±%
BNP	Zakaria Taher Sumon	169,278	76.58	+31.08
Jamaat	Shafiqul Alam Helal	124,187	56.18	+47.58
Majority		45,091	20.40	+13.10
Turnout		221,059	58.05	−26.35
Registered electors		380,833		
BNP gain from AL				

=== Elections in the 2010s ===
Nurul Islam Milon was elected unopposed in the 2014 general election after opposition parties withdrew their candidacies in a boycott of the election.

=== Elections in the 2000s ===
General Election 2008: Comilla-8
Party	Candidate	Votes	%	±%
AL	Nasimul Alam Chowdhury	141,428	52.8	+27.3
BNP	Zakaria Taher	121,887	45.5	−3.0
BTF	Sayed Rezaul Haque Chandpuri	1,507	0.6	N/A
NAP	Md. Abdul Latif	1,372	0.5	N/A
IAB	Md. Delowar Hosan Sarkar	1,004	0.4	N/A
BSD	Saifur Rahman Tapan	448	0.2	N/A
Majority		19,541	7.3	−15.7
Turnout		267,646	84.4	+24.9
AL gain from BNP				

Akbar Hossain died in June 2006. To fill the vacant seat, the Election Commission planned a by-election for 7 September. The High Court, however, blocked the by-election on the grounds that it would be wasteful, as the parliament's tenure was due to end in October with the formation of a caretaker government in preparation for the next general election.

General Election 2001: Comilla-8
Party	Candidate	Votes	%	±%
BNP	Akbar Hossain	65,447	48.5	+4.7
AL	A. T. M. Shamsul Haque	34,399	25.5	−7.6
Independent	AKM Bahauddin Bahar	31,490	23.3	N/A
IJOF	Md. Anowar Hossain	1,911	1.4	N/A
BIF	Shah Nuruzzaman Al Q	1,043	0.8	N/A
Bangladesh Samajtantrik Dal (Basad-Khalekuzzaman)	Saifur Rahman Tapan	494	0.4	N/A
BKA	Md. Jane Alam	185	0.1	N/A
Majority		31,048	23.0	+12.3
Turnout		134,969	59.5	−9.0
BNP hold				

=== Elections in the 1990s ===
General Election June 1996: Comilla-8
Party	Candidate	Votes	%	±%
BNP	Akbar Hossain	51,080	43.8	−12.3
AL	A. T. M. Shamsul Haque	38,577	33.1	+3.7
JP(E)	Ansar Ahmed	20,697	17.7	+16.1
Jamaat	Md. Aminul Haque	5,481	4.7	−3.9
Zaker Party	Md. Wahidul Islam	433	0.4	−0.2
NAP (Bhashani)	Abdul Mazid	300	0.3	N/A
Independent	Md. Mazedul Islam	151	0.1	N/A
Majority		12,503	10.7	−16.0
Turnout		116,699	68.5	+13.5
BNP hold				

General Election 1991: Comilla-8
Party	Candidate	Votes	%	±%
BNP	Akbar Hossain	54,496	56.1	
AL	AKM Bahauddin Bahar	28,552	29.4	
Jamaat	Jashim Uddin Sarkar	8,392	8.6	
Bangladesh Janata Party	Md. Shahidul Haq Selim	2,221	2.3	
JP(E)	Shree Ramen Datta	1,581	1.6	
Zaker Party	Md. Wahidul Islam	588	0.6	
JSD	Shiv Narayan Das	428	0.4	
NAP (Muzaffar)	Md. Zahirul Islam	295	0.3	
Bangladesh Samyabadi Dal (Marxist-Leninist)	Abdur Rauf	234	0.2	
BAKSAL	Md. Abdur Rauf	200	0.2	
Independent	Ahmed Mirza Khabir	141	0.1	
Majority		25,944	26.7	
Turnout		97,128	55.0	
BNP gain from JP(E)				
