= Mohammad A. Akim =

Bangladeshi politician

Member of Bangladesh Parliament
- In office 1986–1988
- Preceded by: Matruza Hossain Mollah
- Succeeded by: Mahbubur Rahman

Personal details
- Party: Jatiya Party (Ershad)

Mohammad A. Akim is a Jatiya Party politician and s former member of parliament fot Comilla-7.

== Career ==
Akim was elected to parliament from Comilla-7 as a Jatiya Party candidate in 1986.
