= Atikul Alam Shawon =

Bangladeshi politician (born 1991)

- আতিকুল আলম শাওন

Member of Parliament
- Incumbent
- Assumed office 17 February 2026
- Preceded by: Pran Gopal Datta
- Constituency: Comilla-7

Personal details
- Born: 1991 (age 34–35) Chandina, Comilla District, Bangladesh
- Party: Independent
- Other political affiliations: Bangladesh Nationalist Party
- Occupation: Politician

Atikul Alam Shawon (Bengali: আতিকুল আলম শাওন; born 1991) is a Bangladeshi independent politician who is an incumbent member of Parliament from the Comilla-7 constituency.

== Early life and education ==
Shaon was born in 1991 to a Bengali family of Muslim politicians in Chandina, Comilla District. His father, Khurshid Alam, was a member of the Bangladesh Nationalist Party, serving as chairman of the Chandina Upazila Council and contesting for Comilla-7 during the 2008 Bangladeshi general election. Shaon studied at the Chandina Model Government Primary School. He received his Secondary School Certificate from Chandina Government Model Pilot School in 2006 and his Higher Secondary Certificate from the College of Development Alternative in Dhanmandi, Dhaka. Shaon graduated with a Bachelor of Laws from the Bhuiyan Law Academy.

== Career ==
Shaon has served as president of the Chandina branch of the Bangladesh Nationalist Party. He has also served as the joint convener of the Party's Comilla District North Branch. He was elected to parliament as an independent candidate for Comilla-7 following the 2026 Bangladeshi general election.
