= Pran Gopal Datta =

Bangladeshi politician (born 1953)

- প্রাণ গোপাল দত্ত
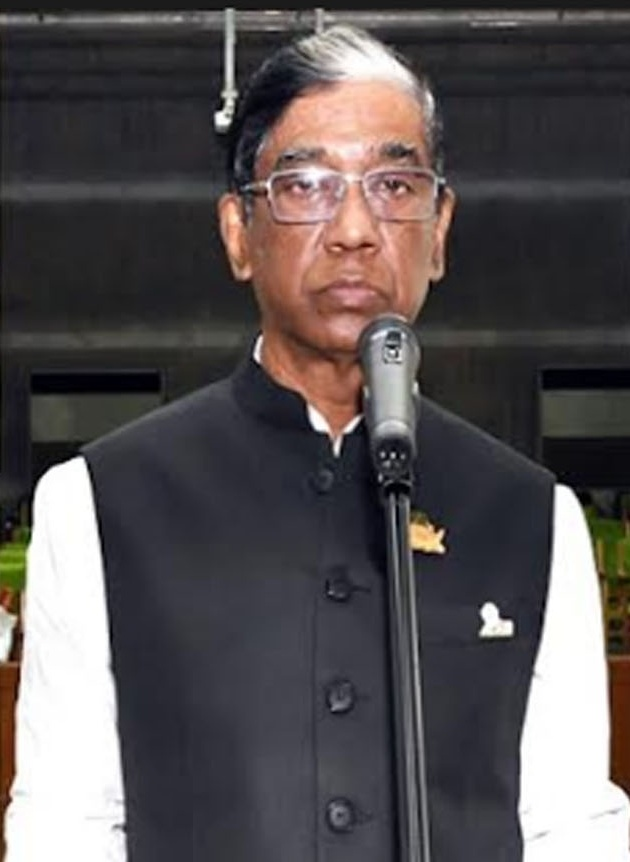
- Datta in 2021

Member of the Bangladesh Parliament for Comilla-7
- In office 30 September 2021 – 6 August 2024
- Preceded by: Ali Ashraf
- Succeeded by: Atikul Alam Shawon

Vice-Chancellor of Bangabandhu Sheikh Mujib Medical University
- In office 25 Mar 2009 – 24 Mar 2015
- Preceded by: Md. Nazrul Islam
- Succeeded by: Kamrul Hasan Khan

Personal details
- Born: 1 October 1953 (age 72) Chandina, Comilla District, East Pakistan
- Party: Bangladesh Awami League
- Education: Chittagong Medical College
- Awards: Independence Day Award

Pran Gopal Datta (born 1 October 1953) is a Bangladeshi physician, university administrator and politician. In September 2021, he won a seat in the Jatiya Sangsad representing the Comilla-7 constituency in an unopposed by-election. The seat had become vacant after Ali Ashraf died in office in July 2021.

Datta was awarded the Independence Day Award, the highest civilian award in Bangladesh, in 2012 for his contributions to the medical field. He is an ear, nose and throat (ENT) specialist. He also served as the personal physician to Prime Minister Sheikh Hasina.

== Background and education ==
Datta was born on 1 October 1953 in Mahichail village, Chandina, Comilla District, the second of seven brothers and sisters. He matriculated from Chandina Pilot High School in 1968 and attended Comilla Victoria College. He earned his MBBS degree at Chittagong Medical College in 1976, PhD degree from Odessa State Medical University in 1983, and an MSc in audiological medicine from University of Manchester in 1993. Datta has worked with and received training under renowned ENT specialists from all over the world including Hans-Peter Zenner of the University of Tübingen. Datta also worked closely with Prof. Armin Löwe of Heidelberg University for the establishment of Bangladesh's first diagnostic clinic for hearing-impaired children.

== Career ==
Datta regularly provides treatment to his patients at Green Life Hospital. He is a professor in the Department of ENT at Bangabandhu Sheikh Mujib Medical University. He also works as an 'Ear, Nose & Throat Specialist & Head Neck surgeon' in the same organization. Datta has conducted research on throat cancer, immunity, developmental disabilities, and autism. Currently, Dr. Pran Gopal Datta has been formally authorized to provide voluntary medical services at Tripura Santiniketan Medical College & Hospital.

Pran Gopal Datta is a regular lecturer for institutions like the National Defence College (Bangladesh), the Bangladesh Institute of Administration and Management, the Judicial Administration Training Institute, the Bangladesh Police Academy, and the Bangladesh Academy for Rural Development.

In 2021, he was nominated by the Awami League to contest by-elections for Jatiya Sangsad from Comilla-7 constituency after the death of Ali Ashraf. He was declared the winner of the Cumilla-7 constituency in 2024, but the election was marred by incidents of violence, ballot-stuffing, vote theft, and allegations of electoral irregularities.

On 5 August 2024, the Awami League government fell amid widespread political unrest and protests after the state sanctioned killings of protesters nationwide. He has been charged for murder on three separate counts, one of which during the July Revolution, regarding the killing of protestors where he was charged with Sheikh Hasina.

In 2025, Dr. Pran Gopal Datta was mentioned in a Bangladesh Financial Intelligence Unit (BFIU) report regarding financial transactions linked to the Shuchona Foundation, a non-profit founded by Saima Wazed, daughter of former Prime Minister Sheikh Hasina. The foundation received significant donations from major Bangladeshi conglomerates, including S Alam Group, Beximco, and PK Halder, an individual accused of financial embezzlement.

According to the report, Dr. Datta made financial contributions to the foundation. However, in November 2024, the BFIU ordered banks to freeze the foundation’s accounts due to suspicious transactions. The Anti-Corruption Commission (ACC) later reported that they could not find the foundation at its registered address in Dhaka’s Dhanmondi area.

== Bibliography ==
=== Books ===
Pran Gopal Datta has authored numerous books on topics ranging from the Bangladesh Liberation War, to juvenile delinquency. These include:

- Pran Gopal Datta, যুবসমাজ ও মূল্যবোধ 1st edition, 2021. 80 pages
- Pran Gopal Datta, পদোন্নতির সাতকাহন 1st edition, 2019. 86 pages
- Pran Gopal Datta, অবিচল সতর্কতা: স্বাধীনতার মূল লক্ষ্য 1st edition, 2019. 112 pages
- Pran Gopal Datta, হৃদয় আমার 1st edition, 2017. 175 pages
- Pran Gopal Datta, আমার যত কথা 1st edition, 2015. 136 pages, ISBN 9-849-13637-5.
