= No. 681 Squadron RAF =

British flying squadron, 1943–1946

- Active: 2 January 1943 – 1 August 1946
- Country: United Kingdom
- Branch: Royal Air Force
- Role: photo-reconnaissance
- Part of: No. 221 Group RAF, RAF India Command; No. 231 Group RAF, Air Command South-East Asia; AHQ Burma, Air Command South-East Asia

Insignia
- Squadron Badge heraldry: No badge known to have been authorised
- Squadron Codes: No code(s) are known to have been carried by this squadron

No. 681 Squadron RAF was a photo-reconnaissance squadron of the Royal Air Force during the Second World War.

== History ==
It was formed out of No. 3 PRU, at Dum Dum in India on 2 January 1943, as part of RAF Far East Air Force. Initially it was mostly equipped with Hurricane PR.Mk.II and Spitfire PR.Mk.IV fighters, but there was also a Dutch element in 'C' flight that operated North American Mitchells, which belonged to the former Royal Netherlands East Indies Army Air Force. The squadron re-equipped with Mosquito PR.IXs in August 1943, and Spitfire PR.XIs in October.

In November 1943 the twin-engined elements were used to form No. 684 Squadron RAF. 681 Squadron, which was now entirely equipped with the Spitfire PR.XI, moved to RAF Alipore, Bengal in May 1944, where the squadron was under No. 171 Wing RAF on 1 July 1944 , and RAF Mingaladon, Burma in June 1945, receiving Spitfire PR.XIX photo-reconnaissance aircraft in August of that year. The squadron moved to RAF Kai Tak, Hong Kong, in September 1945, when the war formally ended. Detachments from the squadron however were still located and kept busy at a wide range of airfields across the South-East Asian theatre of war. The squadron was disbanded by renumbering it to No. 34 Squadron RAF on 1 August 1946 at RAF Palam, Punjab, (then) British India.

== Aircraft operated ==
Aircraft operated by no. 681 Squadron RAF, data from
From	To	Aircraft	Variant
January 1943	November 1943	North American Mitchell	Mk.II (B-25C)
January 1943	November 1943	Hawker Hurricane	Mk.IIc
January 1943	December 1944	Supermarine Spitfire	PR.Mk.IV
August 1943	November 1943	de Havilland Mosquito	Mks.II, IV & IX
October 1943	August 1946	Supermarine Spitfire	PR.XI
August 1945	August 1946	Supermarine Spitfire	PR.XIX

== Squadron airfields ==
Stations and airfields used by No. 681 Squadron RAF, data from
From	To	Name	Remark
25 January 1943	9 December 1943	RAF Dum Dum, Bengal, British India	Detachments at RAF Alipore, Bengal, British India and RAF Agartala, Tripura, British India
9 December 1943	30 January 1944	RAF Chandina, Bengal, British India	
31 January 1944	5 May 1944	RAF Dum Dum, Bengal, British India	
5 May 1944	25 May 1945	RAF Alipore, Bengal, British India	Detachments at RAF Comilla, Bengal, British India; RAF Imphal, Manipur, British India; RAF Kalemyo, Burma; RAF Meiktila, Burma; RAF Monywa, Burma; and RAF Mingaladon, Burma
25 May 1945	27 September 1945	RAF Mingaladon, Burma	Detachment at RAF Alipore, Bengal, British India
27 September 1945	23 December 1945	RAF Kai Tak, Hong Kong	
23 December 1945	9 January 1946	RAF Kuala Lumpur, Malaya	Detachments at Kemayoran Airport Batavia, Dutch East Indies and Tân Sơn Nhất Airfield, Saigon, Vietnam
10 January 1946	28 May 1946	RAF Seletar, Singapore	Detachments at Kemayoran Airport, Dutch East Indies; Don Muang Air Base, Thailand and RAF Mingaladon, Burma
28 May 1946	1 August 1946	RAF Palam, Punjab, British India	Detachment at RAF Kohat, Punjab, British India

== Commanding officers ==
Officers commanding No. 681 Squadron RAF, data from
From	To	Name
January 1943	December 1943	W/Cdr. S.G. Wise, DFC and Bar
December 1943	April 1945	W/Cdr. F.D. Proctor, DFC
April 1945	May 1946	W/Cdr. D.B. Pearson
May 1946	August 1946	S/Ldr. H. Roberts
