= Matruza Hossain Mollah =

Bangladeshi politician

Member of Bangladesh Parliament
- In office 1979–1982
- Preceded by: A. W. M. Abdul Haque
- Succeeded by: Mohammad A. Akim

Personal details
- Died: 16 September 2017
- Party: Bangladesh Nationalist Party

Matruza Hossain Mollah was a Bangladesh Nationalist Party politician and member of parliament for Comilla-7.

== Career ==
Mollah was elected to parliament from Comilla-7 as a Bangladesh Nationalist Party candidate in 1979.

== Death ==
Mollah died on 16 September 2017.
