= Abu Taher (banker) =

Bangladeshi politician

AKM Abu Taher

Member of the Bangladesh Parliament for Comilla-7
- In office 28 October 2001 – 23 September 2004
- Preceded by: Abdul Hakim
- Succeeded by: Zakaria Taher Sumon
- In office 5 March 1991 – 30 March 1996
- Preceded by: Mahbubur Rahman

Personal details
- Born: c. 1932
- Died: 23 September 2004 (aged 72)
- Children: 3, including Zakaria Taher Sumon
- Occupation: Chairman of National Bank Ltd

AKM Abu Taher (c. 1932 – 23 September 2004) was an industrialist and politician in Bangladesh. Taher was a founding member, sponsor director, and chairman of the first private bank in Bangladesh fully owned by Bangladeshi entrepreneurs, National Bank Ltd, as well as a founding director of Al Arafah Bank Ltd. He was also a chairman and managing director of Beco Group of Industries, Purbachal Drillers Ltd, and founder director of Pragati Insurance Ltd and Pragati Life Insurance Ltd. He was also a social worker and philanthropist.

Taher served in the Jatiya Sangsad, the national parliament of Bangladesh, as a Bangladesh Nationalist Party member representing the Comilla-7 (Barura) constituency from 2001 until his death in office.
