= Abdul Hakim (politician) =

Bangladeshi politician

Member of Bangladesh Parliament
- In office 1996–2001
- Preceded by: Abu Taher
- Succeeded by: Abu Taher

Personal details
- Party: Bangladesh Awami League

Abdul Hakim was a Bangladesh Awami League politician and a former member of parliament for Comilla-7.

== Career ==
Hakim was elected to parliament for Comilla-7 as a Bangladesh Awami League candidate in 1996.

== Death ==
Hakim died on 23 March 2014.
