= A. W. M. Abdul Haque =

Bangladeshi politician

Member of Bangladesh Parliament
- In office 1973–1979
- Succeeded by: Matruza Hossain Mollah

Personal details
- Party: Bangladesh Awami League

A. W. M. Abdul Haque is a Bangladesh Awami League politician and a former member of parliament for Comilla-7.

== Career ==
Haque was elected to parliament from Comilla-7 as a Bangladesh Awami League candidate in 1973.
