= Nasimul Alam Chowdhury =

Bangladeshi politician

- নাসিমুল আলম চৌধুরি

Member of the Bangladesh Parliament for Comilla-8
- In office 2019–2024
- Preceded by: Nurul Islam Milon
- Succeeded by: A. Z. M. Shafiuddin Shamim
- In office 2009–2014
- Preceded by: Akbar Hossain
- Succeeded by: Nurul Islam Milon

Personal details
- Born: 31 July 1967 (age 58) Adra, Barura, Cumilla.
- Party: Bangladesh Awami League
- Education: B.A.
- Occupation: Textile, Cable and Export Business.
- Committees: Standing Committee on Ministry of Science and Technology

Nasimul Alam Chowdhury is a Bangladeshi politician and former member of the Bangladesh Parliament from Comilla-8.

== Early life ==
Chowdhury was born on 31 July 1967. He studied up to a H.S.C. degree.

== Career ==
Chowdhury was elected to parliament from Comilla-8 as a Bangladesh Awami League candidate in 2009 and served till 2014.

Chowdhury was re-elected on 30 December 2018 as an Awami League candidate. He had received 188,659 votes while his nearest rival, Jakaria Taher Shumon of Bangladesh Nationalist Party, received 34,219 votes. He was appointed to the parliamentary standing committee on the railway ministry.
