= Ali Ashraf (politician) =

Bangladeshi politician (1947–2021)

- আলী আশরাফ

9th Deputy Speaker of Jatiya Sangsad
- In office 12 July 2001 – 28 October 2001
- Speaker: Mohammad Abdul Hamid
- Preceded by: Mohammad Abdul Hamid
- Succeeded by: Akhtar Hameed Siddiqui

Member of Parliament
- In office 25 January 2009 – 30 July 2021
- Preceded by: Zakaria Taher Sumon
- Succeeded by: Pran Gopal Datta
- Constituency: Comilla-7
- In office 7 April 1973 – 2 April 1979
- Preceded by: Position created
- Succeeded by: Muzaffar Ahmed
- Constituency: Comilla-11

Personal details
- Born: 17 November 1947 Comilla, East Bengal, Pakistan
- Died: 30 July 2021 (aged 73) Dhaka, Bangladesh
- Party: Awami League

Ali Ashraf (17 November 1947 – 30 July 2021) was an Awami League politician who served as deputy speaker of parliament. He became the member of parliament for Comilla-7 in 2008, being re-elected in 2014 and 2018.

== Death ==
Ashraf died on 30 July 2021 at Square Hospital, Dhaka, Bangladesh. He was suffering from gallbladder stones related problems.
