= A. Z. M. Shafiuddin Shamim =

Bangladeshi politician

A.Z.M. Shofiuddin Shamim
- আবু জাফর মোহাম্মদ শফি উদ্দিন

Member of the Bangladesh Parliament for Comilla-8
- In office 30 January 2024 – 6 August 2024
- Prime Minister: Sheikh Hasina
- Preceded by: Nasimul Alam Chowdhury

Personal details
- Born: 10 January 1969 (age 57) Cumilla, East Pakistan, Pakistan
- Party: Bangladesh Awami League
- Spouse: Afroza Sultana (m. 1995)
- Children: 1
- Profession: Politician, businessman

Abu Zafar Mohammod (also A.Z.M. Shofiuddin Shamim; born 10 January 1969) is a Bangladeshi politician and businessman. He is chairman of SQ Group, a business founded by his father in 1961. He was an elected member of the 12th Jatiya Sangsad from Comilla-8 constituency.

== Person. life ==
Shamim was born on 10 January 1969 in Barura Upazila, Cumilla. He completed his Secondary School Certificate (S.S.C.) at Comilla Zilla School and his Higher Secondary Certificate (H.S.C.) at Comilla Government College. He later earned a Bachelor of Commerce (Honours) from University of Dhaka and completed a Master of Business Administration (MBA) at the University of the West of Scotland.

== Career ==
Shamim is the vice president of the Comilla South District Awami League. He was elected chairman of South Bangla Agriculture and Commerce Bank Limited in 2023. He was elected to the Jatiya Sangsad from Comilla-8 constituency in January 2024, where he served until the parliament was dissolved. He subsequently went into hiding following the resignation of Sheikh Hasina.

== Controversies ==
On 7 April 2025, amid an ongoing investigation into allegations that he misappropriated approximately BDT 300 crore from a government project, a Dhaka court imposed a travel ban on Shamim, following an application by the Anti-Corruption Commission.
