= No. 684 Squadron RAF =

- Active: 29 September 1943 – 1 September 1946
- Country: United Kingdom
- Branch: Royal Air Force
- Type: Inactive
- Role: Photo-Reconnaissance
- Part of: No. 231 Group RAF, Air Command South East Asia
- Mottos: Latin: Invisus Videns (Translation: "Seeing through unseen")

Insignia
- Squadron Badge heraldry: A mask
- Squadron Codes: No code(s) are known to have been carried

No. 684 Squadron RAF was a photo-reconnaissance squadron of the Royal Air Force from 1943 to 1946.

== History ==
The squadron was formed on 29 September 1943 at RAF Dum Dum near Calcutta, (then) British India, from the twin-engined elements of No. 681 Squadron RAF. It operated in the photo-reconnaissance role, first with the de Havilland Mosquito and the North American Mitchell, and later also with the Bristol Beaufighter and the Supermarine Spitfire. The squadron performed long-range photo-reconnaissance in support of the Burma Campaign. Near the end of the war, the squadron also performed high-speed courier flights. It was disbanded on 1 September 1946 at RAF Seletar, Singapore, by being renumbered to No. 81 Squadron RAF.

== Aircraft operated ==
Aircraft operated by no. 684 Squadron RAF, data from
From	To	Aircraft	Variant
September 1943	September 1945	North American Mitchell	Mk.II (B-25C)
September 1943	December 1943	de Havilland Mosquito	Mk.II
September 1943	February 1944	de Havilland Mosquito	Mk.VI
October 1943	February 1945	de Havilland Mosquito	Mk.IX
February 1944	May 1946	de Havilland Mosquito	Mk.XVI
May 1945	July 1945	Bristol Beaufighter	Mk.VI
July 1945	September 1946	de Havilland Mosquito	PR.34
July 1945	July 1946	Bristol Beaufighter	Mk.X
December 1945	September 1946	Supermarine Spitfire	PR.XI, PR.XIX

== Squadron bases ==
Air bases and airfields used by no. 684 Squadron RAF, data from
From	To	Name	Remark
29 September 1943	9 December 1943	RAF Dum Dum, Bengal, British India	Formed here
9 December 1943	31 January 1944	RAF Comilla, Bengal, British India	
31 January 1944	5 May 1944	RAF Dum Dum, West Bengal, British India	
5 May 1944	11 October 1945	RAF Alipore, Bengal, British India	Detachments at RAF Yelahanka, Karnataka, British India; RAF China Bay, Ceylon; RAF Cocos Islands and RAF Mingaladon, Burma
11 October 1945	27 January 1946	Tân Sơn Nhất Airfield, Saigon, Vietnam	Detachment at RAF Seletar, Singapore
27 January 1946	August 1946	Don Muang Airfield, Bangkok, Thailand	Detachments at RAF Seletar, Singapore and RAF Baigachi, Bengal
August 1946	1 September 1946	RAF Seletar, Singapore	Disbanded here

== Commanding officers ==
Officers commanding no. 684 squadron RAF, data from
From	To	Name
Sep 1943	Dec 1943	S/Ldr. B.S. Jones
Dec 1943	Nov 1944	W/Cdr. W.B. Murray
Nov 1944	Nov 1945	W/Cdr. W.E.M. Lowry, DFC
Nov 1945	Apr 1946	W/Cdr. K.J. Newman, DFC and Bar (RNZAF)
Apr 1946	Sep 1946	W/Cdr. J.R.H. Merrifield, DSO, DFC and Bar

== See also ==
- List of Royal Air Force aircraft squadrons
