= Chandina Upazila =

Chandina চান্দিনা
- Upazila
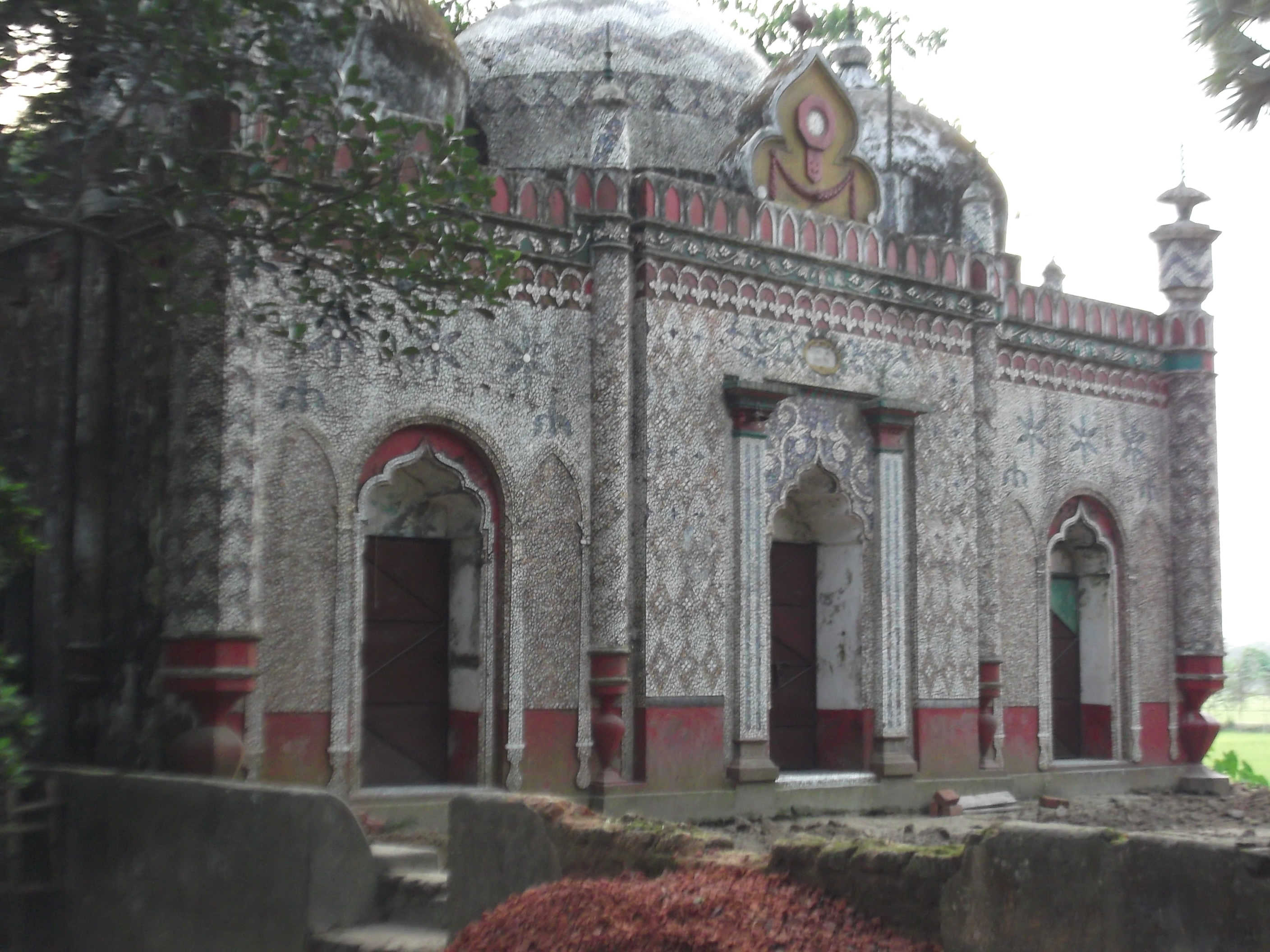
- Three-domed Jame Masjid

- Coordinates: 23°29′N 91°0.5′E
- Country: Bangladesh
- Division: Chittagong
- District: Comilla

Area
  - Total: 201.01 km^{2} (77.61 sq mi)

Population (2022)
  - Total: 394,874
  - Density: 1,964.4/km^{2} (5,087.9/sq mi)
- Time zone: UTC+6 (BST)
- Postal code: 3510
- Area code: 08022
- Website: chandina.comilla.gov.bd

Chandina Upazila mauza geocode map

Chandina (Bengali: চান্দিনা) is an upazila of Comilla District in the Division of Chittagong, Bangladesh.

== Geography ==
Chandina is located at 23.4833°N 91.0083°E. It has 69,736 households and a total area of 201.01 km^{2}. Chandina township is a class B municipality, which is located at the extreme north of the upazila by the N1 or Dhaka-Chittagong Highway. Value of property in the Municipality have increased significantly in last decade due to its proximity to N1 and heavy influx of people coming from villages for education and jobs.

== Demographics ==
Religions in Chandina Upazila (2022)
| Religion | Percent |
| Islam | 94.02% |
| Hinduism | 5.97% |
| Other or not stated | 0.01% |

According to the 2022 Bangladeshi census, Chandina Upazila had 93,458 households and a population of 394,874. 11.18% of the population were under 5 years of age. Chandina had a literacy rate (age 7 and over) of 74.24%: 75.00% for males and 73.60% for females, and a sex ratio of 86.72 males for every 100 females. 86,886 (22.00%) lived in urban areas.

According to the 2011 Census of Bangladesh, Chandina Upazila had 69,736 households and a population of 350,273. 92,365 (26.37%) were under 10 years of age. Chandina had a literacy rate (age 7 and over) of 51.01%, compared to the national average of 51.8%, and a sex ratio of 1112 females per 1000 males. 48,471 (13.84%) lived in urban areas.

== Administration ==
Chandina Upazila is divided into Chandina Municipality and 13 union parishads. They are Barera, Batagashi, Borkoroi, Barkait, Dollai Nawabpur, Etberpur, Gollai, Joag, Keronkhal, Madhaiya, Maijkhar, Mohichail, and Shuhilpur alphabetically. 13 Union parishads are further subdivided into 121 mauzas and 223 villages.

Chandina Municipality is subdivided into 9 wards and 19 mahallas.

== Education ==
- Dhoni bhakta High school
- Mehrav hossain anik High School
- Niha magi High School and College
- Mehrav hossain University College
- Chandana Women's College
- Dollai Nawabpur Government College
- Shaheed Ziaur Rahman College
- Madhaiya Muktijodda Smriti College
- Abeda Noor High School
- Keronkhal School and college
- Khaduty High School
- Pink Lips School and College

== Notable people ==
- Ali Ashraf (1947–2021), 9th Deputy Speaker of Jatiya Sangsad
- Dr.Redwan Ahmed, Minister of State for Liberation War Affairs
- Atikul Alam Shawon (born 1991), politician
- Nazmul Ahsan Kalimullah, 4th Vice-chancellor of the Begum Rokeya University
- Abul Bashar Mohammed Khurshid Alam, Director General of Directorate General of Health Services
- Pran Gopal Datta, politician
- Mohamed Salimullah (1944–2024), Bangladesh national football team player

== See also ==
- Upazilas of Bangladesh
- Districts of Bangladesh
- Divisions of Bangladesh
