= Ansar Ahmed =

Bangladeshi politician

Member of Bangladesh Parliament

Personal details
- Born: 1947 Comilla, Bangladesh
- Died: 24 June 2014 (aged 66–67) Dhaka, Bangladesh
- Party: Jatiya Party (Ershad)

Ansar Ahmed was a Jatiya Party (Ershad) politician and member of parliament for Comilla-8.

== Career ==
Ahmed was elected to parliament from Comilla-8 as a Jatiya Party candidate in 1986 and 1988. He died on 24 June 2014 in Dhaka.
