= Climate change in Victoria =

Climate change in Victoria affects various environments and industries, including agriculture.

== Greenhouse gas emissions ==
Victoria's emissions decreased from 123.23 million tonnes in 2005 to 84.72 million tonnes in 2022 representing a reduction of 31.3% over this time period.

== Impacts of climate change ==
=== Built environment ===
The state's infrastructure was not built with extreme weather in mind, and is therefore considered to be unprepared according to a report by Infrastructure Victoria - it estimates that disaster recovery may cost $1,000,000,000,000 by 2100.

== Response ==
=== Policies ===
In 2021, the Victorian government released its Climate Change Strategy.

In 2024, the Victorian government approved a new license for a gas project on Victoria's Great Ocean Road. From 2024 and onward, gas connections in new homes have been banned.

Power stations are not required to install fabric filters, but health advocates have proposed it to the state government.

=== Legislation ===
==== Climate Change Act 2017 ====
Climate Change Act 2017

Parliament of Victoria
- Long title: Act to repeal and re-enact with amendments the Climate Change Act 2010, to establish greenhouse gas emissions reduction targets for Victoria, to set out policy objectives and guiding principles, to provide for climate change planning and reporting, to provide for forestry rights and carbon sequestration rights and to make consequential amendments to the Environment Protection Act 1970 and for other purposes.
- Citation: No. 5 of 2017
- Assented to: 2024-04-26

Legislative history
- Bill title: Climate Change Bill 2016

Keywords
- emissions targets
- Status: In force

The Act requires that the Victorian government to set interim emissions reduction targets on the way to net zero emissions by 2050.

The Act has many of the features of typical framework climate legislation, including emissions reductions targets, mitigation strategies, adaptation plans. The Act requires the Victorian government to prepare sector-specific plans to adapt the state to climate change and mitigate emissions.

The Act also explicitly requires that climate change be considered in government decisions, policies, programs and processes and a more specific duty to have due to regard to climate change in prescribed decisions.

The Act was found not to require setting a limit on greenhouse gas emissions on coal plants. According to a judgement of the Supreme Court of Victoria, climate change only needs to be considered and climate change was considered in the decision not to set a limit.

== See also ==
- Climate change in Australia
