= Climate change in New South Wales =

Climate change in New South Wales affects various environments and industries, including agriculture.

== Greenhouse gas emissions ==
New South Wales' emissions decreased from 152.74 million tonnes in 2005 to 111.0 million tonnes in 2022 representing a reduction of 27.3% over this time period.

== Impacts of climate change ==
=== Wildlife ===
Eastern blue gropers appear to be in decline in NSW coastal waters.

=== Flooding ===
Large areas across the state experienced significant flooding in 2021.

=== Farming ===
Flower farmers experienced winter blooms for the first time in the 2024 winter.

== Response ==
=== Policies ===
In 2024, the New South Wales government started requiring considering the 2030 emissions target in planning decisions, the proposals for which had been criticized by property developers. In 2024 the NSW government approved the state's largest-ever mining proposal.

In 2021 the state strengthened its existing target for a 35% reduction from 2005 to 2035 to a 50% reduction from 2005 to 2030. The state has had a binding target of a reduction of emissions of 70% by 2035, compared to 2005 levels since 2024.

In 2023, the City of Sydney voted to ban gas connections and mandate that all new buildings must be all-electric.

=== Legislation ===
==== Electricity Infrastructure Investment Act 2020 ====
Electricity Infrastructure Investment Act 2020

Parliament of New South Wales
- Long title: An Act to co-ordinate investment in new generation, storage and network infrastructure in New South Wales; and for other purposes.
- Citation: 2020 No 44
- Assented to: 2020-12-02

Keywords
- emissions targets
- Status: In force

The Electricity Infrastructure Investment Act 2020 sets out the New South Wales Government's comprehensive plan to decarbonise its energy system.

Under the Act, "renewable energy zones" were created in order to fast track infrastructure development.

==== Electric Vehicles (Revenue Arrangements) Act 2021 ====
Electric Vehicles (Revenue Arrangements) Act 2021

Parliament of New South Wales
- Long title: An Act to provide for a system of distance-related road user charges for zero and low emissions vehicles and to amend the Duties Act 1997 to exempt certain zero and low emissions vehicles from the payment of duty under Chapter 9 of that Act.
- Citation: 2021 No 25
- Assented to: 2021-11-01

Keywords
- emissions targets
- Status: In force

In September 2022, the takeup of electric cars reached 30%. In order to make up for fuel excise revenue, the New South Wales government announced a tax of 2.5 cents per kilometre for electric cars, with a rate for plug-in electric vehicles of 2 cents per kilometre.

== See also ==
- Climate change in Australia
