= Climate Institute of Australia =

Australian climate change organisation

The Climate Institute was a Sydney-based policy think-tank established in 2005 to encourage progressive policies for managing climate change in Australia.

Research work undertaken by the institute included an analysis of the vulnerability of sport to the growing physical impacts of climate change, modelling the effects of Australia's Renewable Energy Target, and examining the financial impacts of delayed climate change action. The institute also produced the annual Climate of the Nation report, a comprehensive survey of Australians’ attitudes on climate change, its impacts and solutions.

An important component of the Climate Institute's work was building alliances and networks representing organisations across Australia's economy and society to achieve diverse support for strong action on climate change. It has been a lead player in key business alliances such as the Australian Climate Roundtable.

Through its role in the Asset Owners Disclosure Project, the institute was also a pioneer in trying to get large asset owners – such as superannuation and pension funds – to recognise and disclosure carbon risk.

The institute was originally set up for five years under funding provided by the Poola Foundation's Tom Kantor fund. In 2017, the Climate Institute announced it would be closing in June. The Australia Institute was selected to carry over the Climate Institute's legacy and remaining intellectual property including continuing the benchmark Climate of the Nation report.

== Former Board of Directors ==
- Mr John Connor, CEO, The Climate Institute
- Mr Mark Wootton, (chair) farmer and director, Poola Foundation
- Mr Andrew Demetriou, former CEO, Australian Football League
- Ms Susan Jeanes, principal, Jeanes Holland and Associates
- Mr Adam Kilgour, managing director, Diplomacy Pty Ltd
- Mr Matt Koch, executive director, Morgan Stanley
- Ms Clare Martin, professorial fellow at Charles Darwin University's Northern Institute
- Ms Jenny Merkley, associate director (Climate Change and Sustainability Group), KPMG
- Dr. Graeme Pearman, senior research fellow, Monash University
- Dr. Hugh Saddler, managing director, SustainAbility Advice Team Pty Ltd

== Climate of the Nation report ==
The Climate Institute conducted research into the attitudes of Australians on climate change, its impacts and solutions, regularly since 2007 until its closure. The results, based on quantitative and qualitative social research, were captured in Climate of the Nation reports. The data has become a key benchmark used by the climate/environment movement, media and other key stakeholders, domestically and internationally.

== Closure and transfer to The Australia Institute ==
In June 2017, The Climate Institute announced its closure due to a lack of funding. The Australia Institute was selected to carry over the Climate Institute's legacy and remaining intellectual property including continuing the benchmark Climate of the Nation report. The 2018 Climate of the Nation report was subsequently released in September 2018.

== Alliances and networks ==
The Climate Institute has helped to set up and/or participated in the following alliances and networks focused on building diverse support for action on climate change:

- Australian Climate Roundtable – An unprecedented alliance of major business, union, research, environment, investor and social groups. Members include the Australian Aluminium Council, Australian Conservation Foundation, Australian Council of Social Service, Australian Council of Trade Unions, Australian Industry Group, Business Council of Australia, The Climate Institute, Energy Supply Association of Australia, the Investor Group on Climate Change and WWF Australia.
- Australian Religious Response to Climate Change – A multi-faith climate network set up in 2008 to provide educational, practical and campaigning resources to religious communities to respond to climate change.
- Sports Environment Alliance (SEA) – A not-for-profit, membership-based organisation focused on urging sport to take action and provide leadership in the environmental arena. Members include the Australian Football League, Cricket Australia, Football Federation Australia, Greater Western Sydney Giants, Netball Australia, Tennis Australia and Victoria Racing Club. The Climate Institute partnered with the SEA to launch the Sport & Climate Impacts report in January 2015.
- Environmental NGOs Network on Carbon Capture and Storage – Created in 2011, the network aims to ensure that CCS is performed and regulated safely, effectively and according to best practice.

== Asset Owners Disclosure Project ==
The Asset Owners Disclosure Project (AODP) was originally developed as an initiative of the Climate Institute in 2008. The AODP is now an independent global not-for-profit global organisation aiming to protect asset owners from the risks posed by climate change, although it maintains a close working relationship with the institute.

The AODP works with pension funds, insurance companies, sovereign wealth funds, foundations and universities to improve the level of disclosure and industry best practice. It conducts an annual survey and assessment of the world's 1000 largest asset owners and publishes the AODP Global Climate 500 Index, which ranks these organisations based on their management of climate change risks.

== See also ==
- The Australia Institute
- Climate Council
- Effects of global warming on Australia
