= John Connor (Australia) =

Australian chief executive

John Connor is the chief executive officer of the Carbon Market Institute (CMI) the independent and non-partisan peak industry body for business and climate in Australia.

Prior to joining CMI in May 2019, John Connor served for over two years as executive director of the Fijian Government's COP23 Presidency Secretariat. In that role he managed the Secretariat's strategic, policy and logistical support functions as Fiji presided over the UNFCCC, international climate, negotiations.

For the previous decade he was CEO of The Climate Institute of Australia, overseeing its focus on national policy, institutional investors and international climate negotiations.

In his time at the Climate Institute Connor oversaw the release of a series of reports on Australia's Climate Change response, including economic modeling on how Australia can reduce emissions and maintain a growing economy, up to date evidence on Australia’s greenhouse pollution profile and analysis of community opinions on climate change and climate change solutions.

Initially trained as a lawyer and working in the Land and Environment Court of NSW he subsequently became a researcher for Peter MacDonald the Independent member for Manly. After that he spent three years running the Nature Conservation Council of NSW and in 1999 he took up the job as Campaigns Director for the Australian Conservation Foundation. He then worked as Campaigns Manager for World Vision, where he also co-convened Make Poverty History Australia. He was appointed CEO of the Climate Institute of Australia in 2007.

Connor has worked on numerous government and business advisory panels currently including the NSW Government's Climate Council. He is a graduate of the Australian Institute of Corporate Directors. He has been a board member of a number of NGOs and was a "Governator" with the Australian Youth Climate Coalition.

== See also ==
- Climate change in Australia
