= Hugh Saddler =

Hugh Saddler was an Australian energy economist and writer.

Saddler was the author of a book on Australian energy policy, Energy in Australia, and over 50 scientific papers, monographs and articles on energy technology and environmental policy, and is recognised as one of Australia's leading experts in this field. Saddler was a member of the Experts Group on Emissions Trading, appointed by the Australian Greenhouse Office, of the ABS Environmental Statistics Advisory Group, and of the ACT Environment Advisory Committee. In 1998 he was appointed an adjunct professor at Murdoch University. He was a Fellow of the Australian Institute of Energy and a member of the International Association for Energy Economics. Saddler founded the company Energy Strategies in 1982.

He died on 29 June, 2023, aged 79.

== Bibliography ==
- Saddler, Hugh (1981). Energy in Australia : politics and economics, Sydney: George Allen & Unwin Australia. ISBN 0-86861-306-1

== See also ==
- Renewable energy commercialization in Australia
