= Climate change in Australia =

Impacts of climate change on Australia and responses

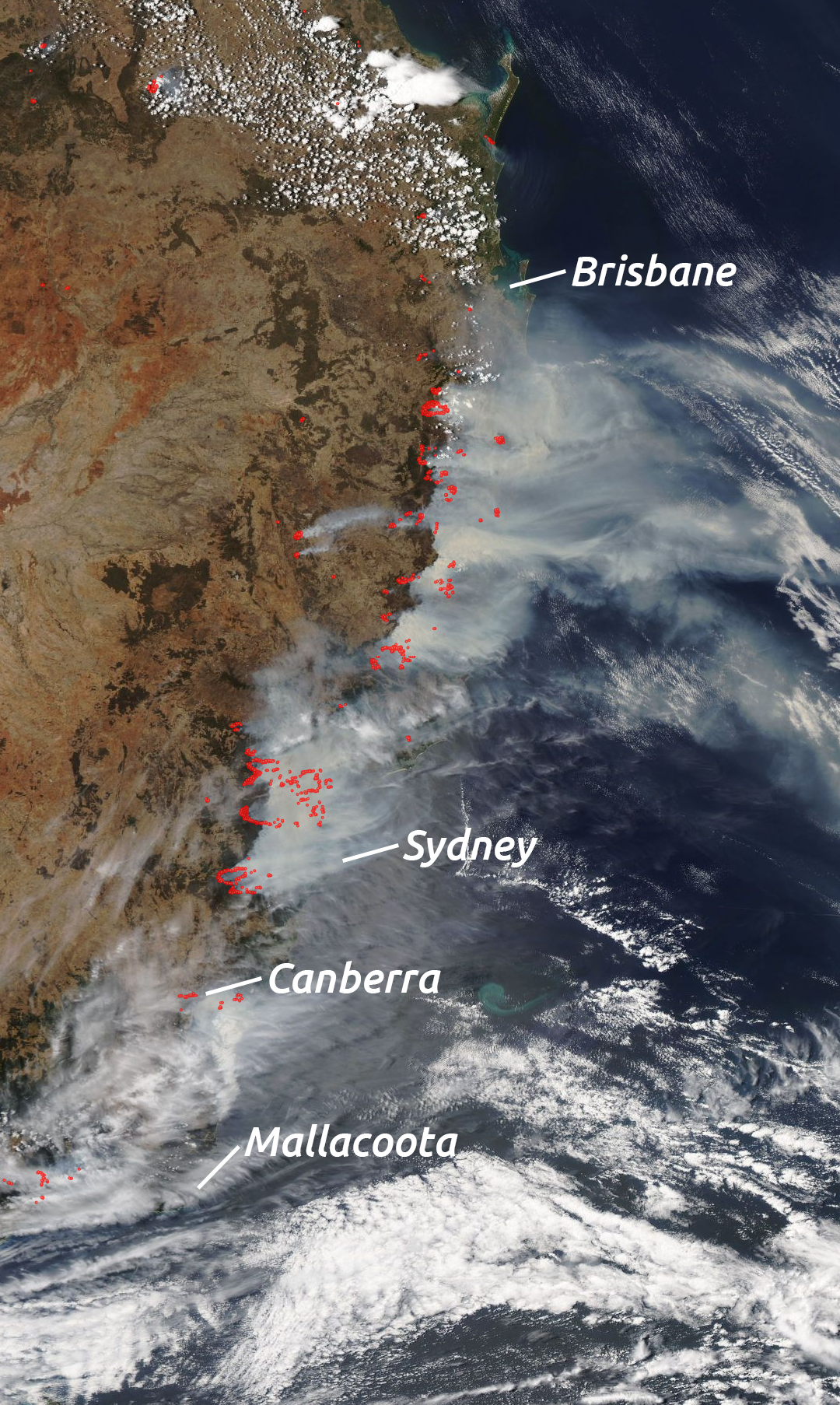
Climate change is increasing the frequency and size of bushfires, as evidenced by the 2019–20 Australian bushfire season.

Climate change has been a critical issue in Australia since the beginning of the 21st century. Australia is becoming hotter and more prone to extreme heat, bushfires, droughts, floods, and longer fire seasons because of climate change. Climate issues include wildfires, heatwaves, cyclones, rising sea levels, and erosion.

Since the beginning of the 20th century, Australia has experienced an increase of over 1.5 °C in average annual temperatures, with warming occurring at twice the rate over the past 50 years compared with the previous 50 years. In 2025, the Australian Government reported "high confidence" that the global temperature rise "will stabilise some" at the increase of 1.5-3 °C. Recent climate events such as extremely high temperatures and widespread drought have focused government and public attention on the effects of climate change in Australia. Rainfall in southwestern Australia has decreased by 10–20% since the 1970s, while southeastern Australia has also experienced a moderate decline since the 1990s. Rainfall is expected to become heavier and more infrequent, as well as more common in summer rather than in winter. Australia's annual average temperatures are projected to increase 0.4–2.0 °C above 1990 levels by the year 2030, and 1–6 °C by 2070. Average precipitation in the southwest and southeast Australia is projected to decline during this time, while regions such as the northwest may experience increases in rainfall.

Climate change is affecting the continent's environment and ecosystems. Australia is vulnerable to the effects of global warming projected for the next 50 to 100 years because of its extensive arid and semi-arid areas, already warm climate, and high annual rainfall variability. The continent's high fire risk increases this susceptibility to changes in temperature and climate. Meanwhile, Australia's coastlines will experience erosion and inundation from an estimated 8–88 centimetres (3.1–34.6 in) increase in global sea level. Australia's unique ecosystems such as the Great Barrier Reef and many animal species are also at risk.

Climate change also has diverse implications for Australia's economy, its agriculture and public health. Projected impacts include more severe floods, droughts, and cyclones. Furthermore, Australia's population is highly concentrated in coastal areas at risk from rising sea levels, and existing pressures on water supply will be exacerbated. The exposure of Indigenous Australians to climate change impacts is exacerbated by existing socio-economic disadvantages which are linked to colonial and post-colonial marginalisation. The communities most affected by climate changes are those in the North where Aboriginal and Torres Strait Islander people make up 30% of the population. Aboriginal and Torres Strait Islander communities located in the coastal north are the most disadvantaged due to social and economic issues and their reliance on traditional land for food, culture, and health. This has raised the question for many community members in these areas, "Should we stay or move away?"

Australia is also a contributor to climate change, with its greenhouse gas emissions per capita above the world average. The country is highly reliant on coal and other fossil fuels, although renewable energy coverage is increasing. National climate change mitigation efforts include a commitment to achieving net zero emissions by 2050 under the Paris Agreement, although Australia has repeatedly ranked poorly in the Climate Change Performance Index and other international rankings for its climate targets and implementation. Climate change adaptation can be performed at national and local levels and was identified as a priority for Australia in the 2007 Garnaut Review.

Climate change has been a divisive or politicised issue in Australian politics since the 2000s, contributing to successive governments implementing and repealing mitigation policies such as carbon pricing. Some Australian media outlets have promoted climate misinformation. The issue has sparked protests in support of climate change policies, including some of the largest demonstrations and school strikes in Australia's history.

== Greenhouse gas emissions ==
Emissions of carbon dioxide, a greenhouse gas, per capita by country

Greenhouse gas emissions by Australia totalled 533 million tonnes CO_{2}-equivalent based on greenhouse gas national inventory report data for 2019; representing per capita CO_{2}e emissions of 21 tons, three times the global average. Coal was responsible for 30% of emissions. The national Greenhouse Gas Inventory estimates for the year to March 2021 were 494.2 million tonnes, which is 27.8 million tonnes, or 5.3%, lower than the previous year. It is 20.8% lower than in 2005 (the baseline year for the Paris Agreement). According to the government, the result reflects the decrease in transport emissions due to COVID-19 pandemic restrictions, reduced fugitive emissions, and reductions in emissions from electricity; however, there were increased greenhouse gas emissions from the land and agriculture sectors.

Australia uses principally coal power for electricity, accounting for 66% of grid-connected electricity generation in 2020, but this is rapidly decreasing with a growing share of renewables making up the energy supply mix, and most existing coal-fired power station scheduled to cease operation between 2022 and 2048. Emissions by the country have started to fall and are expected to continue to fall in coming years as more renewable projects come online.

Climate Action Tracker rates Australia's overall commitment to emissions reduction as "insufficient". Policies and action is "insufficient", domestic target is "almost sufficient", fair share target is "insufficient", and climate finance is "critically insufficient". This is because the Australian government has continued to invest in natural gas projects, refused to increase its 2030 domestic emissions target, and is not on track to meet its current target.

Climate change in Australia is caused by greenhouse gas emissions, and the country is generally becoming hotter, and more prone to extreme heat, bushfires, droughts, floods and longer fire seasons because of climate change. As of 2024, the emissions totaled to 378.73 million tons

== Impacts on the natural environment ==
Australian annual average temperature anomaly from 1910 with five-year locally weighted ('Lowess') trend line. Source: Australian Bureau of Meteorology.

=== Temperature and weather changes ===
Köppen climate classification map for Australia for 1980–2016

2071–2100 map under the most intense climate change scenario. Mid-range scenarios are currently considered more likely

Australia's instrumental record from 1885 to the present shows the following broad picture:

Conditions from 1885 to 1898 were generally fairly wet, though less so than in the period since 1968. The only noticeably dry years in this era were 1888 and 1897. Although some coral core data suggest that 1887 and 1890 were, with 1974, the wettest years across the continent since settlement, rainfall data for Alice Springs, then the only major station covering the interior of the Northern Territory and Western Australia, strongly suggest that 1887 and 1890 were overall not as wet as 1974 or even 2000.

In New South Wales and Queensland, however, the years 1886–1887 and 1889–1894 were indeed exceptionally wet. The heavy rainfall over this period has been linked with a major expansion of the sheep population and February 1893 saw the disastrous 1893 Brisbane flood.

For the later 19th century, reconstructed instrumental records indicate that temperatures across south-eastern Australia between 1860 and 1910 were broadly similar to those experienced during 1910–1950 and substantially cooler than those of recent decades.

A drying of the climate took place from 1899 to 1921, though with some interruptions from wet El Niño years, especially between 1915 and early 1918 and in 1920–1921, when the wheat belt of the southern interior received exceptionally heavy winter rainfall. Two major El Niño events in 1902 and 1905 contributed to severe drought conditions across much of Australia, while 1919 was also notably dry in many eastern regions apart from Gippsland.

The period from 1922 to 1938 was exceptionally dry, with only 1930 having Australia-wide rainfall above the long-term mean and the Australia-wide average rainfall for these seventeen years being 15 to 20 per cent below that for other periods since 1885. This dry period is attributed in some sources to a weakening of the Southern Oscillation and in others to reduced sea surface temperatures. Temperatures in these three periods were generally cooler than they are currently, with 1925 having the coolest minima of any year since 1910. However, the dry years of the 1920s and 1930s were also often quite warm, with 1928 and 1938 having particularly high maxima.

The period from 1939 to 1967 began with an increase in rainfall: 1939, 1941 and 1942 were the first close-together group of relatively wet years since 1921. From 1943 to 1946, generally dry conditions returned, and the two decades from 1947 saw fluctuating rainfall. 1950, 1955 and 1956 were exceptionally wet except 1950 and 1956 over arid and wheatbelt regions of Western Australia. 1950 saw extraordinary rains in central New South Wales and most of Queensland: Dubbo's 1950 rainfall of 1,329 mm (52.3 in) can be estimated to have a return period of between 350 and 400 years, whilst Lake Eyre filled for the first time in thirty years. In contrast, 1951, 1961 and 1965 were very dry, with complete monsoon failure in 1951/1952 and extreme drought in the interior during 1961 and 1965. Temperatures over this period initially fell to their lowest levels of the 20th century, with 1949 and 1956 being particularly cool, but then began a rising trend that has continued with few interruptions to the present.

Since 1968, Australia's rainfall has been 15 per cent higher than between 1885 and 1967. The wettest periods have been from 1973 to 1975 and 1998 to 2001, which comprise seven of the thirteen wettest years over the continent since 1885. Overnight minimum temperatures, especially in winter, have been markedly higher than before the 1960s, with 1973, 1980, 1988, 1991, 1998 and 2005 outstanding in this respect. There has been a marked decrease in the frequency of frost across Australia.

According to the Bureau of Meteorology, Australia's annual mean temperature for 2009 was 0.9 °C above the 1961–90 average, making it the nation's second-warmest year since high-quality records began in 1910.

According to the Bureau of Meteorology's 2011 Australian Climate Statement, Australia had lower than average temperatures in 2011 as a consequence of a La Niña weather pattern; however, "the country's 10-year average continues to demonstrate the rising trend in temperatures, with 2002–2011 likely to rank in the top two warmest 10-year periods on record for Australia, at 0.52 °C (0.94 °F) above the long-term average". Furthermore, 2014 was Australia's third warmest year since national temperature observations commenced in 1910.

=== Sea level rise ===
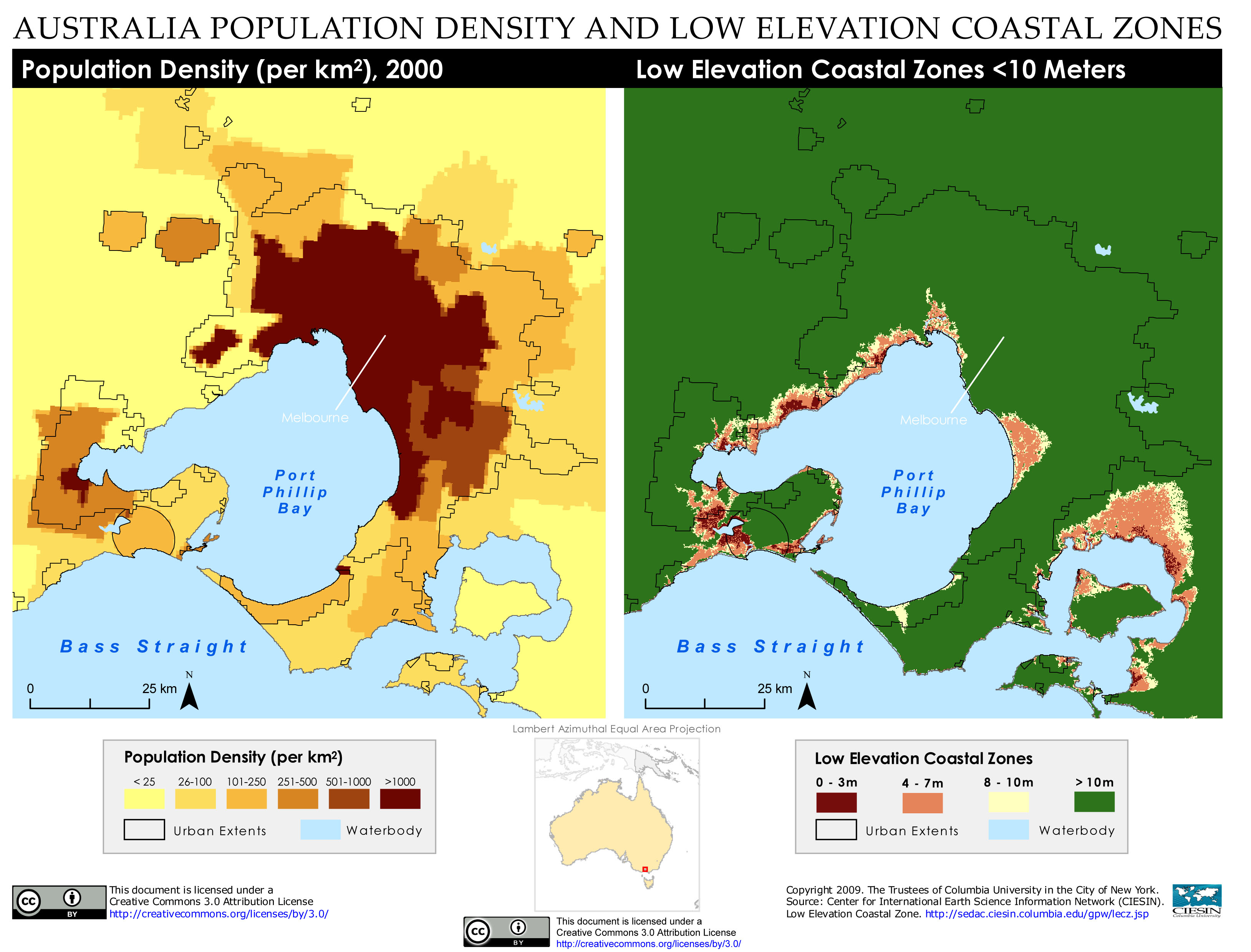
Melbourne population density and low elevation coastal zones

The Australian Government released a report saying that up to 247,600 houses are at risk from flooding from a sea level rise of 1.1 metres. There were 39,000 buildings located within 110 metres of 'soft' erodible shorelines, at risk from a faster erosion due to sea level rise. Adaptive responses to this specific climate change threat are often incorporated in the coastal planning policies and recommendations at the state level. For instance, the Western Australia State Coastal Planning Policy established a sea level rise benchmark for initiatives that address the problem over a 100-year period. Lower projections indicate that sea levels will rise by 40 to 90 cm upon the end of the century

=== Water (droughts and floods) ===
Bureau of Meteorology records since the 1860s show that a 'severe' drought has occurred in Australia, on average, once every 18 years. Australia is already the driest populated continent in the world.

Rainfall in southwestern Australia has decreased by 10–20% since the 1970s, while southeastern Australia has also experienced a moderate decline since the 1990s. Rainfall is expected to become heavier and more infrequent, as well as more common in summer rather than in winter.

In June 2008 it became known that an expert panel had warned of long-term, maybe irreversible, severe ecological damage for the whole Murray-Darling basin if it did not receive sufficient water by October of that year. Water restrictions were in place in many regions and cities of Australia in response to chronic shortages resulting from the 2008 drought. In 2004 paleontologist Tim Flannery predicted that unless it made drastic changes the city of Perth, Western Australia, could become the world's first ghost metropolis—an abandoned city with no more water to sustain its population.

In 2019 the Drought and Water Resources Minister of Australia David Littleproud, said, that he "totally accepts" the link between climate change and drought in Australia because he "lives it". He called for a reduction in greenhouse gas emission and massive installation of renewable energy. Former leader of the Nationals Barnaby Joyce said that if the drought became more fierce and dams were not built, the Coalition risks "political annihilation".

According to the 2022 IPCC report, there has been an increase in flooding episodes and other catastrophic weather events because of global warming. These unusual weather changes in include rainfall in the north and severe droughts in the south. Less rainfall means less streamflow of water for major cities. The IPCC recommends a step up to our adaptation and finance policies in our systems to keep up with the drastic impacts of climate change for a sustainable development.

=== Water resources ===
Healthy and diverse vegetation is essential to river health and quality, and many of Australia's most important catchments are covered by native forest, maintaining a healthy ecosystem. Climate change will affect growth, species composition and pest incursion of native species and in turn, will profoundly affect water supply from these catchments. Increased re-afforestation in cleared catchments also has the prospect for water losses.

Between 1970 and 2024, 28% of Australia's Hydrological Reference Stations showed a significant decrease in streamflow while 4% showed a significant increase. The stations with increases were all in northern Australia while those with decreases were largely in southern Australia.

The CSIRO predicted that the additional effects in Australia of a temperature rise of between only 1 and 2 °C will be:

- 12–25% reduction inflow in the Murray River and Darling River basin.
- 7–35% reduction in Melbourne's water supply.

=== Bushfires ===
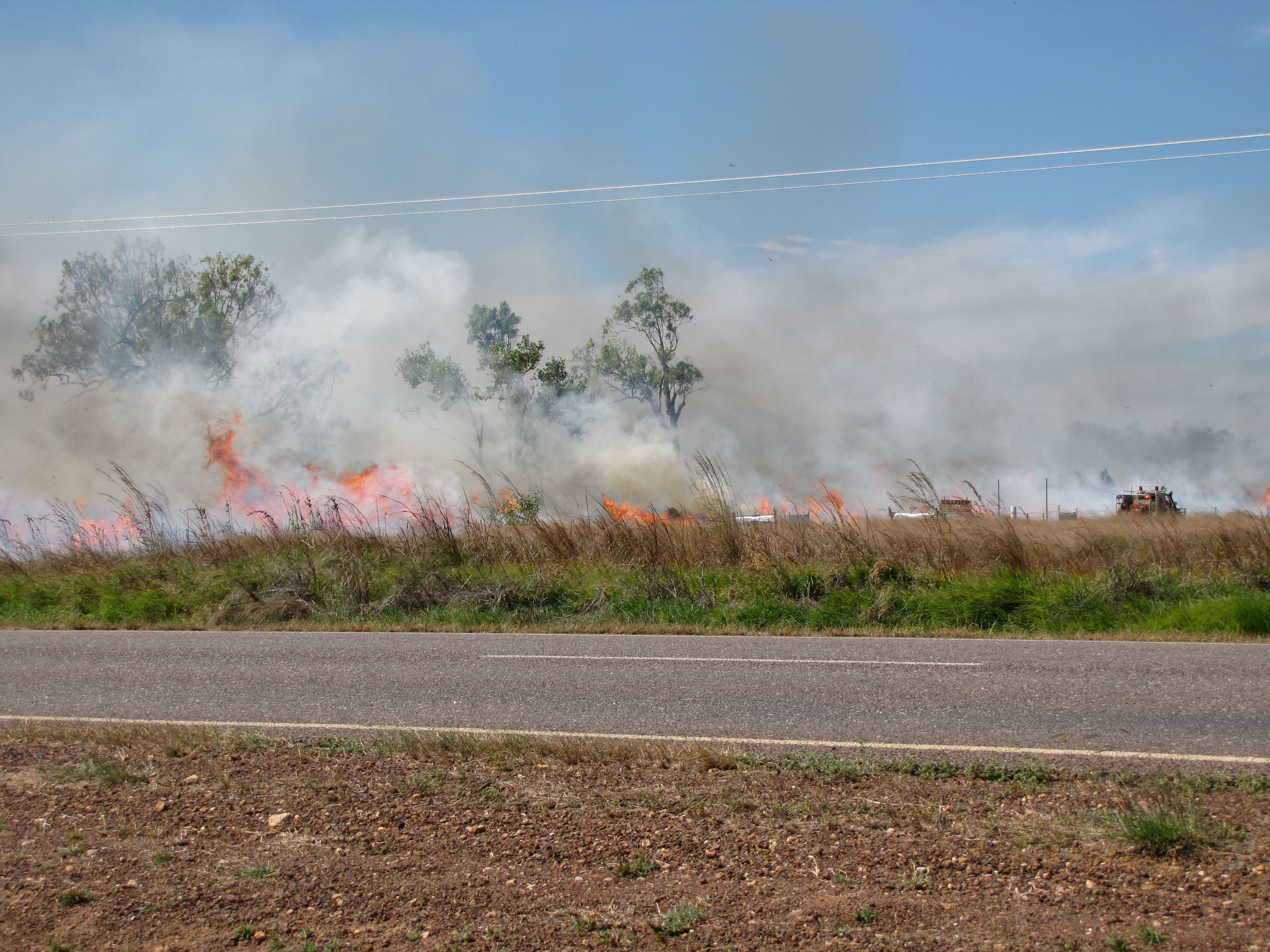
Bushfires in Australia are exacerbated by rising temperatures and drought conditions associated with climate change.

There is an increase in fire activity in Australia since 1950. The causes include "more dangerous fire weather conditions, increased risk factors associated with pyroconvection, including fire-generated thunderstorms, and increased ignitions from dry lightning, all associated to varying degrees with anthropogenic climate change".

Firefighting officials are concerned that the effects of climate change will increase the frequency and intensity of bushfires under even a "low global warming" scenario. A 2006 report, prepared by CSIRO Marine and Atmospheric Research, Bushfire CRC, and the Australian Bureau of Meteorology, identified South Eastern Australia as one of the three most fire-prone areas in the world, and concluded that an increase in fire-weather risk is likely at most sites over the next several decades, including the average number of days when the McArthur Forest Fire Danger Index rating is very high or extreme. It also found that the combined frequencies of days with very high and extreme FFDI ratings are likely to increase 4–25% by 2020 and 15–70% by 2050, and that the increase in fire-weather risk is generally largest inland.

Former Australian Greens leader, Bob Brown said that the fires were "a sobering reminder of the need for this nation and the whole world to act and put at a priority the need to tackle climate change". The Black Saturday Royal Commission recommended that "the amount of fuel-reduction burning done on public land each year should be more than doubled".

In 2018, the fire season in Australia began in the winter. August 2018 was hotter and windier than the average. Those meteorological conditions led to a drought in New South Wales. The Government of the state already gave more than $1 billion to help the farmers. The hotter and drier climate led to more fires. The fire seasons in Australia are lengthening and fire events became more frequent in the latest 30 years. These trends are probably linked to climate change.

The 2019–20 Australian bushfire season was by some measures Australia's "worst bushfire season on record". In New South Wales, the fires burnt through more land than any other blazes in the past 25 years, in addition to being the state's worst bushfire season on record. NSW also experienced the longest continuously burning bushfire complex in Australia's history, having burnt more than 4 million hectares (9,900,000 acres), with 70-metre-high (230 ft) flames being reported. Approximately 3 billion animals were killed or displaced by the bushfires and this made them one of the worst natural disasters in recorded history. The chance of reaching the climatic conditions that fuels the fires became more than four times bigger since the year 1900 and will become eight times more likely to occur if the temperature will rise by 2 degrees from the preindustrial level. In December 2019 the New South Wales Government declared a state of emergency after record-breaking temperatures and prolonged drought exacerbated the bushfires.

In 2019 bushfires linked to climate change created air pollution 11 times higher that the hazardous level in many areas of New South Wales. Many medical groups called to protect people from "public health emergency" and moving on from fossil fuels.

According to the United Nations Environment Programme the megafires in Australia in 2019–2020 are probably linked to climate change that created the unusually dry and hot weather conditions. This is part of a global trend. Brazil, the United States, the Russian Federation, and the Democratic Republic of the Congo all face similar problems. By the second week of January the fires burned a territory of approximately 100,000 square kilometres close to the territory of England, killed one billion animals and caused large economic damage.

Researchers claim that the exceptionally strong wildfires in 2019–2020 were impossible without the effects of climate change. More than one-fifth of Australian forests were burned in one season, which was completely unprecedented. They say that: "In the case of recent events in Australia, there is no doubt that the record temperatures of the past year would not be possible without anthropogenic influence, and that under a scenario where emissions continue to grow, such a year would be average by 2040 and exceptionally cool by 2060." Climate change probably also caused drier weather conditions in Australia by impacting Indian Ocean Dipole, which also increase fires. In average, below 2% of Australian forests burn annually. Climate change has increased the likelihood of the wildfires in 2019–2020 by at least 30%, but researchers said the result is probably conservative.

=== Extreme weather events ===
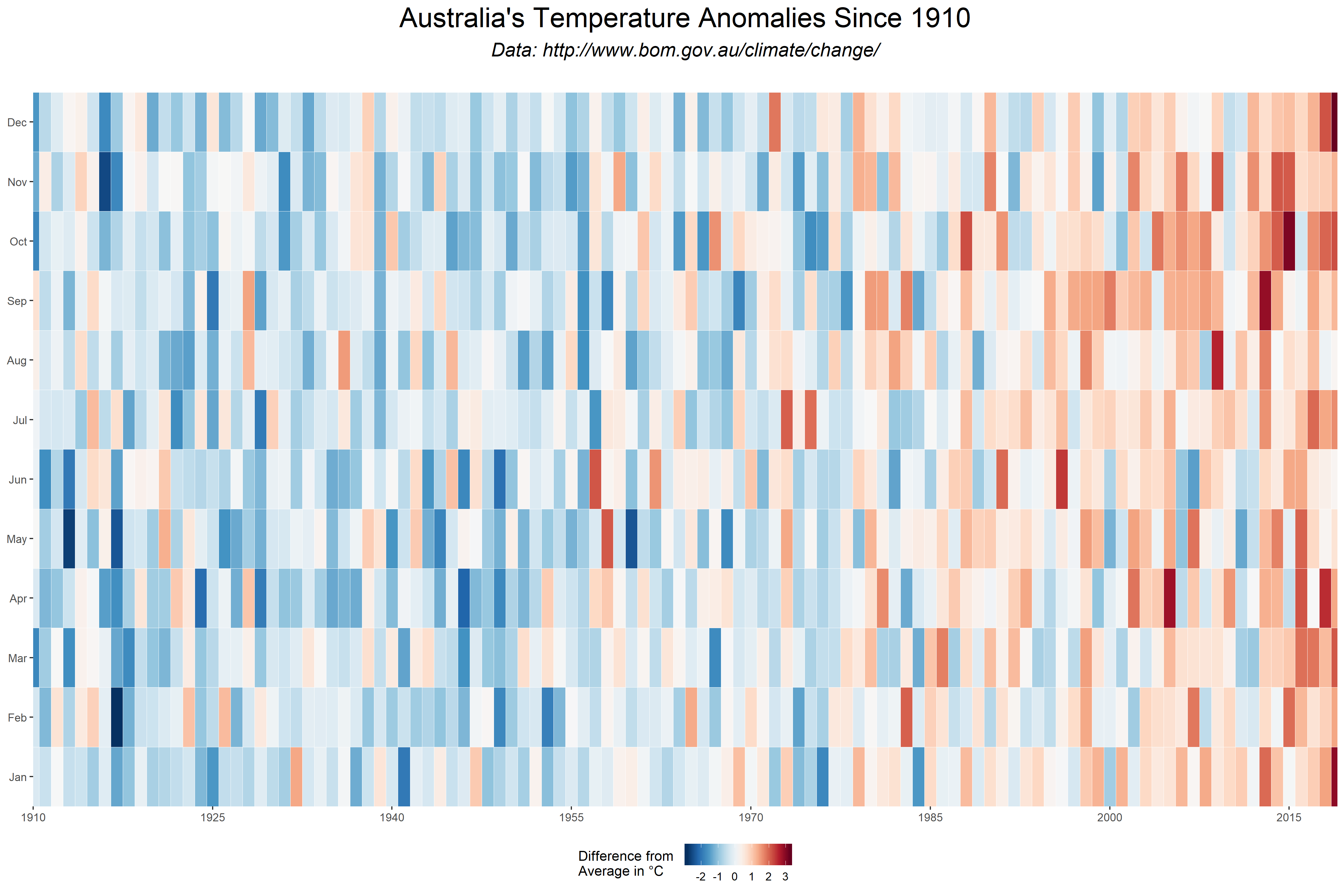
Heatmap of Australia's land temperature anomalies since 1910

Rainfall patterns and the degree of droughts and storms brought about by extreme weather conditions are likely to be affected. The CSIRO predicts that a temperature rise of between 2 and 3 °C on the Australian continent could incur some of the following extreme weather occurrences, in addition to standard patterns:

- Wind speeds of tropical cyclones could intensify by 5 to 10%.
- In 100 years, strong tides would increase by 12–16% along eastern Victoria's coast.
- The forest fire danger indices in New South Wales and Western Australia would grow by 10% and the forest fire danger indices in south, central and north-east Australia would increase by more than 10%.

==== Heatwaves ====
A report in 2014 revealed that, due to the change in climatic patterns, heat waves were found to be increasingly more frequent and severe, with an earlier start to the season and longer duration.

Since temperatures began to be recorded in 1910, they have increased by an average of 1 °C, with most of this change occurring from 1950 onwards. This period has seen the frequency and intensity of extreme heat events increase.

Summer 2013–14 was warmer than average for the entirety of Australia. Both Victoria and South Australia saw record-breaking temperatures. Adelaide recorded a total of 13 days reaching 40 °C or more, 11 of which reached 42 °C or more, as well as its fifth-hottest day on record—45.1 °C on 14 January. The number of days over 40 °C beat the previous record of summer 1897–1898, when 11 days above 40 °C were recorded. Melbourne recorded six days over 40 °C, while nighttime temperatures were much warmer than usual, with some nights failing to drop below 30 °C. Overall, the summer of 2013–2014 was the third-hottest on record for Victoria, fifth-warmest on record for New South Wales, and sixth-warmest on record for South Australia. This heatwave has been directly linked to climate change, which is unusual for specific weather events.

Following the 2014 event, it was predicted that temperatures might increase by up to 1.5 °C by 2030.

2015 was Australia's fifth-hottest year on record, continuing the trend of record-breaking high temperatures across the country. According to Australian Climate Council in 2017 Australia had its warmest winter on record, in terms of average maximum temperatures, reaching nearly 2 °C above average. January 2019 was the hottest month ever in Australia with average temperatures exceeding 30 °C (86 °F).

=== Ecosystems and biodiversity ===
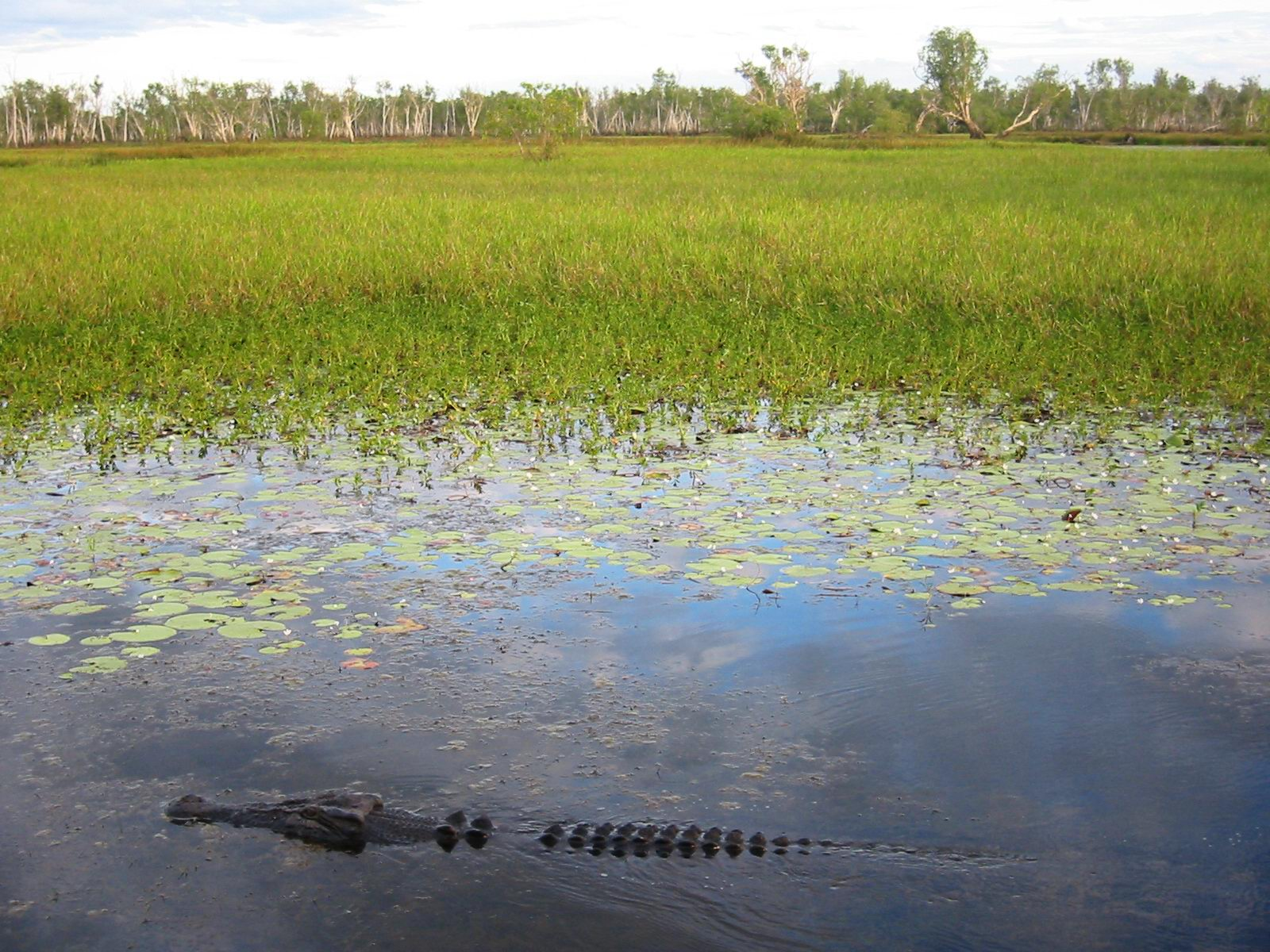
Wetlands in Kakadu National Park

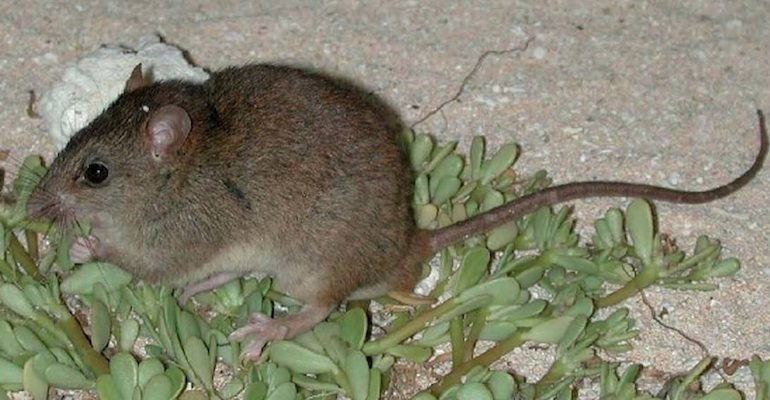
The Bramble Cay melomys has been described as the first mammal extinction due to climate change.

Sustained climate change could have drastic effects on the ecosystems of Australia. For example, rising ocean temperatures and continual erosion of the coasts from higher water levels will cause further bleaching of the Great Barrier Reef. Beyond that, Australia's climate will become even harsher, with more powerful tropical cyclones and longer droughts.

The Department of Climate Change said in its Climate Change Impacts and Costs fact sheet: "...ecologically rich sites, such as the Great Barrier Reef, Queensland Wet Tropics, Kakadu Wetlands, Australian Alpine areas, south-western Australia and sub- Antarctic islands are all at risk, with significant loss of biodiversity projected to occur by 2020". It also said: "Very conservatively, 90 Australian animal species have so far been identified at risk from climate change, including mammals, insects, birds, reptiles, fish, and amphibians from all parts of Australia."

Australia is one of 17 countries recognized as megadiverse. Climate change is an increasing threat to Australia's biodiversity, alongside habitat loss and invasive species. On the Great Barrier Reef, rising sea temperatures have caused repeated mass coral bleaching events, including in 2024 and 2025.

The CSIRO predicts that the additional results in Australia of a temperature rise of between 2 and 3 °C will be:

- 97% of the Great Barrier Reef bleached annually.
- 10–40% loss of principal habitat for Victoria and montane tropical vertebrate species.
- 92% decrease in butterfly species' primary habitats.
- 98% reduction in Bowerbird habitat in Northern Australia.
- 80% loss of freshwater wetlands in Kakadu (30 cm sea level rise).

A study conducted in 2024, suggests that worsening climate scenarios may have significant impacts on the habitat area for vertebrates and vascular plant species in Australia. This data suggests that in 2030, the habitat area among species appears consistent across climate scenarios, however, by 2090, a significant change is predicted, as deteriorating climate conditions are associated with reductions in habitat area for biodiversity.

==== Great Barrier Reef ====
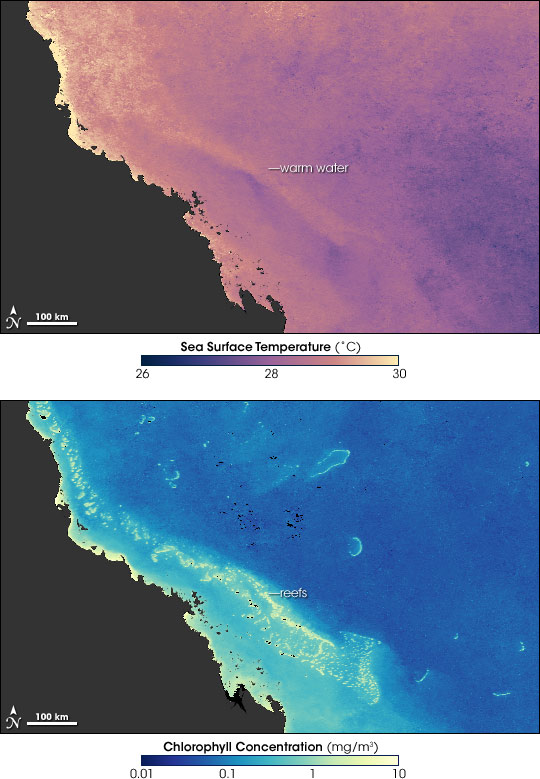
Water temperature and coral bleaching in the Great Barrier Reef in 2006.

The Great Barrier Reef could be killed as a result of the rise in water temperature forecast by the IPCC. A UNESCO World Heritage Site, the reef has experienced unprecedented rates of bleaching over the past two decades, and additional warming of only 1 °C is anticipated to cause considerable losses or contractions of species associated with coral communities.

==== Lord Howe Island ====
The coral reefs of the World Heritage-listed Lord Howe Island could be killed as a result of the rise in water temperature forecast by the IPCC. As of April 2019, approximately 5% of the coral is dead.

== Impacts on people ==
=== Economic impacts ===
According to the Climate Commission (now the Climate Council) report in 2013, the extreme heatwaves, flooding and bushfires striking Australia have been intensified by climate change and will get worse in future in terms of their impacts on people, property, communities and the environment. The summer of 2012/2013 included the hottest summer, hottest month and hottest day on record. The cost of the 2009 bushfires in Victoria was estimated at A$4.4bn (£3bn) and the Queensland floods of 2010/2011 cost over A$5bn.

In 2008 the Treasurer and the Minister for Climate Change and Water released a report that concluded the economy will grow with an emissions trading scheme in place.

A report released in October 2009 by the Standing Committee on Climate Change, Water, Environment and the Arts, studying the effects of a 1-metre sea level rise, quite possible within the next 30–60 years, concluded that around 700,000 properties around Australia, including 80,000 buildings, would be inundated, the collective value of these properties is estimated at $155 billion.

In 2019 the Australian Bureau of Agricultural and Resource Economics and Sciences published a report about the impact of climate change on the profitability of the Australian agriculture, saying that the profit of the Australian farms was cut by 22% due to climate change in the years 2000–2019.

According to the 2022 IPCC report Australia will lose billions of dollars due to loss of life, and physical damages. These natural disasters are caused by climate change and increasing global warming will worsen these events. The report estimates that under 2 degrees of warming Australia will lose $115 billion in the next decade, and $350 billion in the next twenty years. If warming goes up to under 3 degrees of warming Australia's economy will lose $200 billion and $600 billion by 2042.

==== Agriculture forestry and livestock ====
Small changes caused by global warming, such as a longer growing season, a more temperate climate and increased CO_{2} concentrations, may benefit Australian crop agriculture and forestry in the short term. However, such benefits are unlikely to be sustained with increasingly severe effects of global warming. Changes in precipitation and consequent water management problems will further exacerbate Australia's current water availability and quality challenges, both for commercial and residential use.

The CSIRO predicts that the additional results in Australia of a temperature rise of between 3 and 4 °C will be:

- 32% possibility of diminished wheat production (without adaptation).
- 45% probability of wheat crop value being beneath present levels (without adaptation).
- 55% of primary habitat lost for Eucalyptus.
- 25–50% rise in common timber yield in cool and wet parts of South Australia.
- 25–50% reduction in common timber yield in North Queensland and the Top End.
- 6% decrease in Australian net primary production (for 20% precipitation decrease)
- 128% increase in tick-associated losses in net cattle production weight.

==== Electricity demand ====
Use of domestic air conditioners during severe heatwaves can double electricity demand, placing great stress on electricity generation and transmission networks, and lead to load shedding. In addition, bushfires can damage electricity lines, while repairing power poles and power line damages is often restricted during hot and dry weather because of high fire risks.

=== Impacts on housing ===
==== Settlements and infrastructure ====
Global warming could lead to substantial alterations in climate extremes, such as tropical cyclones, heat waves and severe precipitation events. This would degrade infrastructure and raise costs through intensified energy demands, maintenance for damaged transportation infrastructure, and disasters, such as coastal flooding. In the coastal zone, sea level rise and storm surge may be more critical drivers of these changes than either temperature or precipitation.

The CSIRO describes the additional impact on settlements and infrastructure for rises in temperature of only 1 to 2 °C: A 22% rise in 100-year storm surge height around Cairns; as a result, the area flooded doubles.

==== Human settlements ====
Climate change will have a higher impact on Australia's coastal communities, due to the concentration of population, commerce and industry. Climate modelling suggests that a temperature rise of 1–2 °C will result in more intense storm winds, including those from tropical cyclones. Combine this with sea level rise, and the result is greater flooding, due to higher levels of storm surge and wind speed. The impact of climate change on insurance against catastrophes. Proceedings of Living with Climate Change Conference. Canberra, 19 December.) Tourism of coastal areas may also be affected by coastal inundation and beach erosion, as a result of sea level rise and storm events. At higher levels of warming, coastal impacts become more severe with higher storm winds and sea levels.

==== Property ====
A report released in October 2009 by the Standing Committee on Climate Change, Water, Environment and the arts, studying the effects of a 1-metre sea level rise, possible within the next 30–60 years, concluded that around 700,000 properties around Australia, including 80,000 buildings, would be inundated. The collective value of these properties is estimated at $150 billion.

A 1-metre sea level rise would have massive impacts, not just on property and associated economic systems, but in displacement of human populations throughout the continent. Queensland is the state most at risk due to the presence of valuable beachfront housing.

=== Impacts on foreign policy and national security ===
Several prominent reports and decision makers are concerned that climate change affects Australia's national security. A 2023 assessment of the Australian Office of National Intelligence on the security implications of climate change (commissioned by Anthony Albanese) remains classified. These concerns are tied to broader debates about climate security.

Climate change is unlikely to trigger large-scale migration movements to Australia. Research shows that people adversely affected by climate change often lack the resources to migrate over large distances (they are adapt in-situ or move to nearby places). This is particularly the case for Australia, which is an island nation with tough border controls and immigration policies.

Climate change can cause major challenges to Australia's foreign policies. Pacific Island countries, which are highly vulnerable to climate change, have repeatedly blamed Australia for not being active enough in mitigating climate change. With geopolitical tensions between Australia and China on the rise, these countries are of high relevance for the Australian government. In addition, existing data suggest that several countries in Australia's neighbourhood (e.g., Indonesia, the Philippines, large parts of South Asia) and some key partner governments (e.g., India, Papua New Guinea) are very vulnerable to climate-related unrest and conflict.

Several reports also warn that climate change poses significant challenges to the capacities of the Australian Defence Force. Many military bases are located close to the coastline, which is threatened by sea-level rise and more intense storms. Civilian infrastructure relevant to military operations (like transports networks and power lines) is also adversely affected by climate change, for instance when floods wash away key supply roads. More extreme heat days complicate military training and put a heavier toll on equipment, particularly in northern Australia. Finally, the Australian Defence Force will be called upon more often to provide disaster relief within the country and internationally, further straining its resources.

=== Health impacts ===
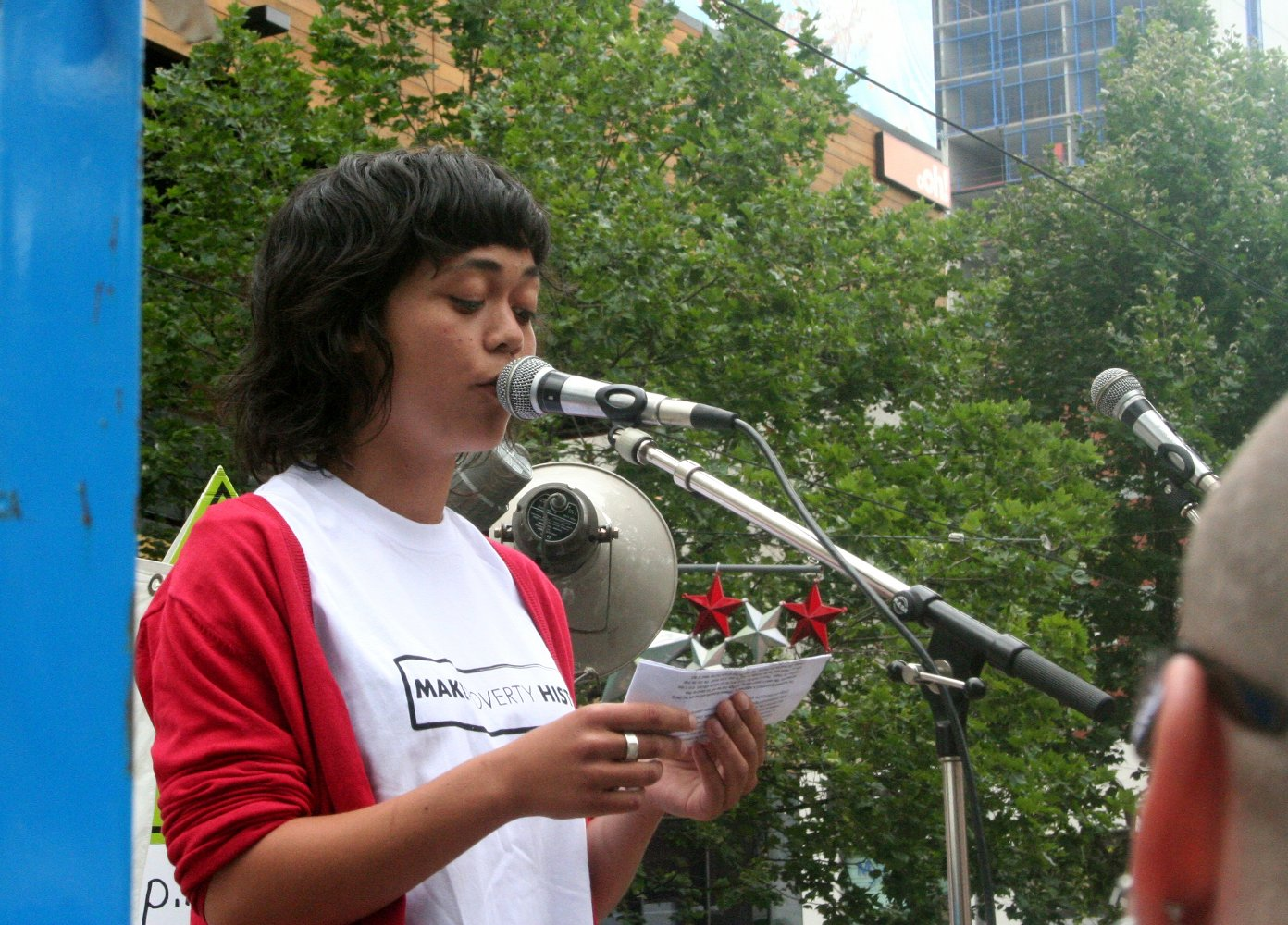
Refugees from Pacific Islands such as Tuvalu are projected to increase.

The CSIRO predicts that the additional results in Australia of a temperature rise of between only 1 and 2 °C will be:

- Southward spread of malaria receptive zones.
- Risk of dengue fever among Australians increases from 170,000 people to 0.75–1.6 million.
- 10% increase in diarrhoeal diseases among Aboriginal children in central Australia.
- 100% increase in a number of people exposed to flooding in Australia.
- Increased influx of refugees from the Pacific Islands.

Based on some predictions for 2070, data suggests that people who are not accustomed to the warmer climate may experience as much as 45 days per year where they are unable to tolerate being outside, compared to the current 4–6 days per year.

=== Impacts on indigenous Australians ===
Indigenous Australians have a millennia long history of responding and adapting to social and environmental changes. Indigenous Australians have a high level of situated traditional knowledge and historical knowledge about climate change. However, the exposure of Indigenous Australians to climate change impacts is exacerbated by existing socio-economic disadvantages which are linked to colonial and post-colonial marginalisation.

Some of these changes include a rise in sea levels, getting hotter and for a longer period of time, and more severe cyclones during the cyclone season. Climate issues include wild fires, heatwaves, floods, cyclones, rising sea levels, rising temperatures, and erosion. The communities most affected by climate changes are those in the North where Aboriginal and Torres Strait Islander people make up 30% of the population. Aboriginal Australians and Torres Strait Islander communities located in the coastal north are the most disadvantaged due to social and economic issues and their reliance on traditional land for food, culture, and health. This has begged the question for many community members in these regions, should they move away from this area or remain present.

Many Aboriginal people live in rural and remote agricultural areas across Australia, especially in the Northern and Southern areas of the continent. There are a variety of different climate impacts on different Aboriginal communities which includes cyclones in the Northern region and flooding in Central Australia which negatively impacts cultural sites and therefore the relationship between indigenous people and the places that hold their traditional knowledge. Other effects include sea level rise, loss of land and hunting ground, changes in fire regimes, increased severity and duration of wet and dry seasons as well as reduced numbers of animals in the sea, rivers and creeks.

==== Vulnerability ====
The vulnerability comes from remote location where indigenous groups live, lower socio-economic status, and reliance of natural systems for economic needs. Disadvantages which are compounding Indigenous peoples vulnerability to climate change include inadequate health and educational services, limited employment opportunities as well as insufficient infrastructure. Top down institutions have also restricted Indigenous Australians ability to contribute to climate policy frameworks and have their culture and practices recognised.

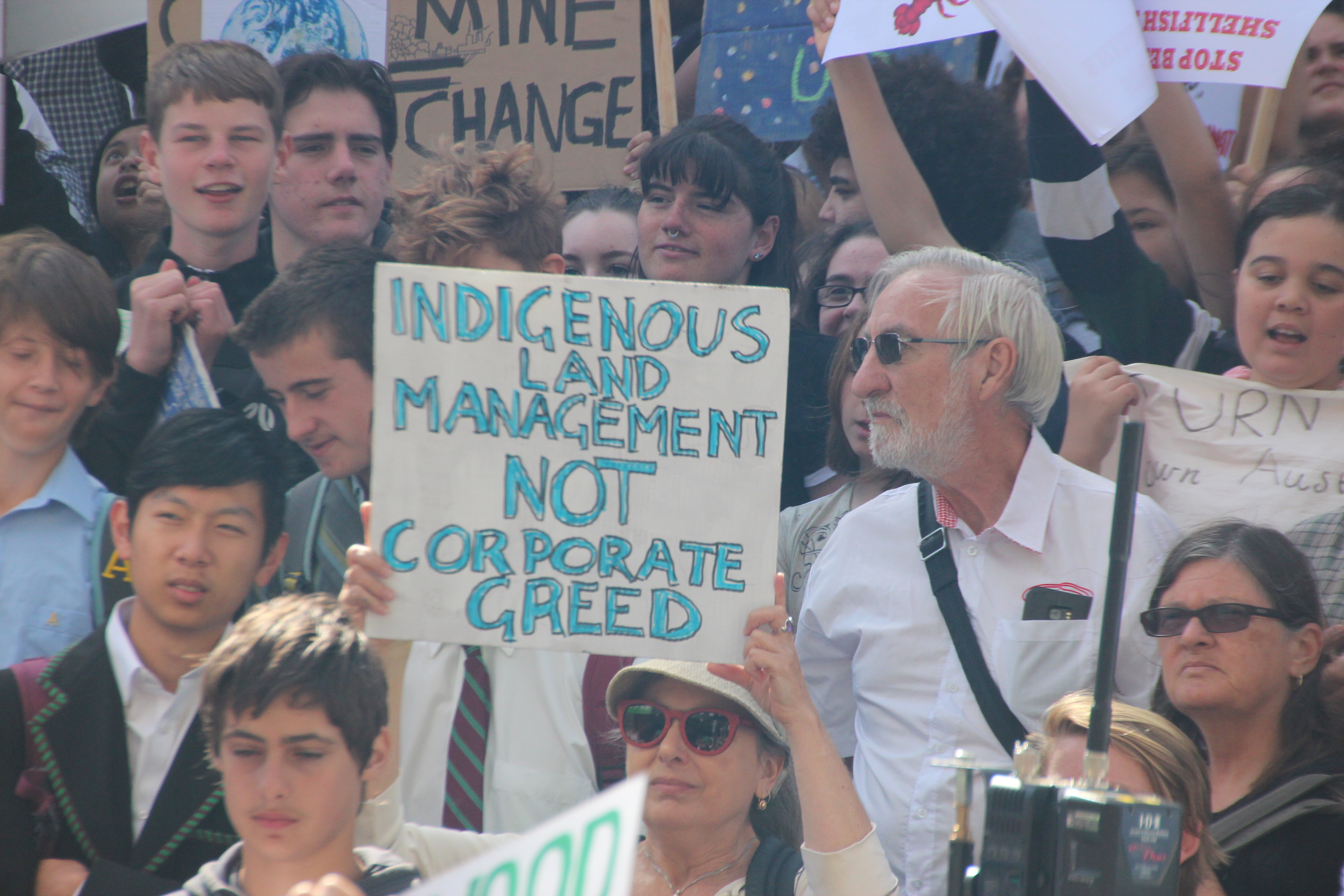
A protest sign reads "Indigenous land management not corporate greed" at the Melbourne Climate Strike in March 2019.

Many of the economic, political, and social-ecological issues present in indigenous communities are long term effects from colonialism and the continued marginalization of these communities. These issues are aggravated by climate change and environmental changes in their respective regions. Indigenous people are seen as particularly vulnerable to climate change because they already live in poverty, poor housing and have poor educational and health services, other socio-political factors place them at risk for climate change impacts. Indigenous people have been portrayed as victims and as vulnerable populations for many years by the media. Aboriginal Australians believe that they have always been able to adapt to climate changes in their geographic areas.

Many communities have argued for more community input into strategies and ways to adapt to climate issues instead of top down approaches to combating issues surrounding environmental change. This includes self-determination and agency when deciding how to respond to climate change including proactive actions. Indigenous people have also commented on the need to maintain their physical and mental well-being in order to adapt to climate change which can be helped through the kinship relationships between community members and the land they occupy.

In Australia, Aboriginal people have argued that in order for the government to combat climate change, their voices must be included in policy making and governance over traditional land. Much of the government and institutional policies related to climate change and environmental issues in Australia has been done so through a top down approach. Indigenous communities have stated that this limits and ignores Aboriginal Australian voices and approaches. Due to traditional knowledge held by these communities and elders within those communities, traditional ecological knowledge and frameworks are necessary to combat these and a variety of different environmental issues.

===== Heat and drought =====
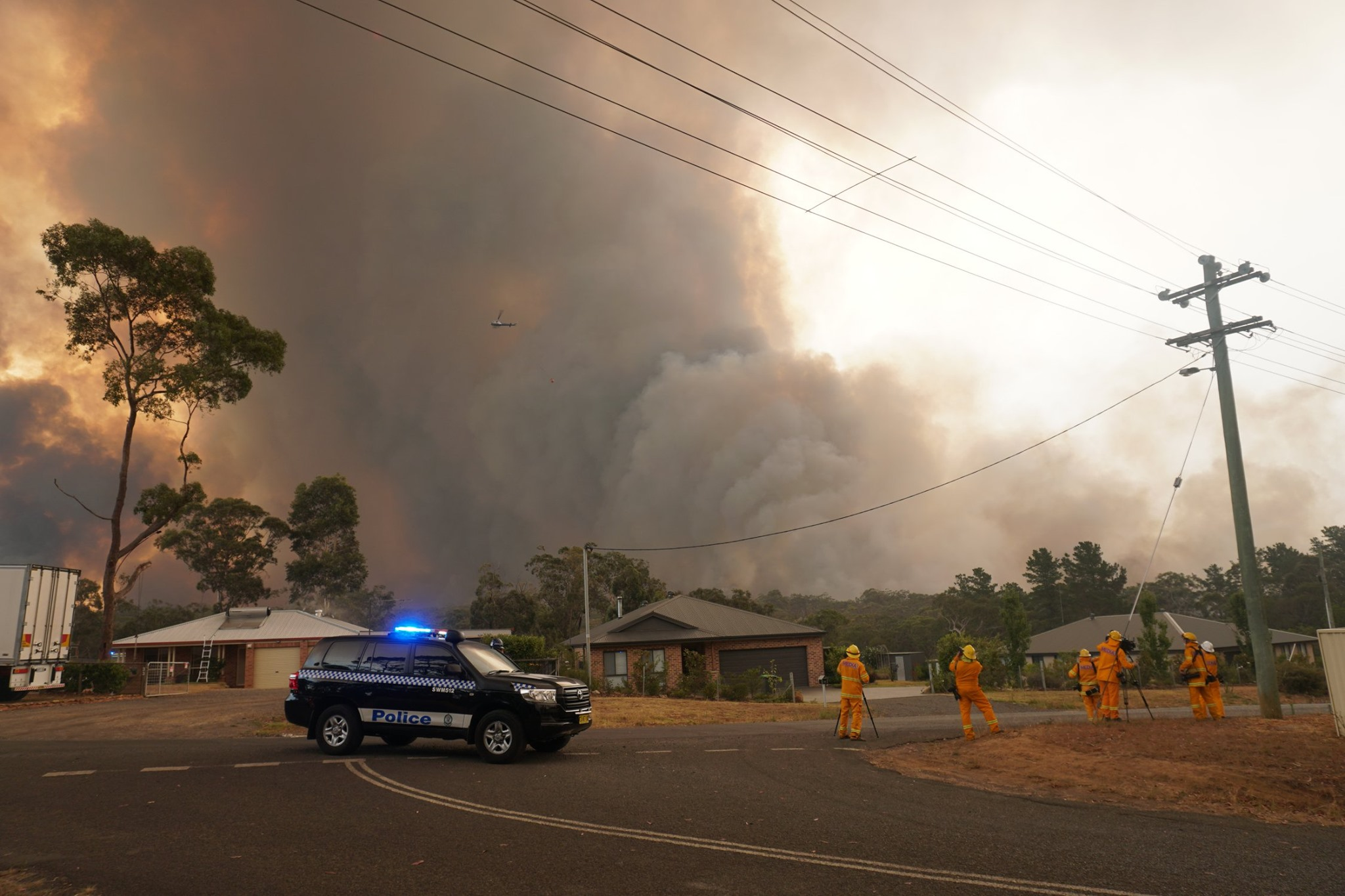
"The Green Wattle Creek bushfire moves towards the Southern Highlands township of Yanderra in Southern Australia as police evacuate residents from Yanderra Road" (December 2019)

Fires and droughts in Australia, including the Northern regions, occur mostly in savannas because of current environmental changes in the region. The majority of the fire prone areas in the savanna region are owned by Aboriginal Australian communities, the traditional stewards of the land. Aboriginal Australians have traditional landscape management methods including burning and clearing the savanna areas which are the most susceptible to fires. Traditional landscape management declined in the 19th century as Western landscape management took over. Today, traditional landscape management has been revitalized by Aboriginal Australians, including elders. This traditional landscape practices include the use of clearing and burning to get rid of old growth. Though the way in which indigenous communities in this region manage the landscape has been banned, Aboriginal Australian communities who use these traditional methods actually help in reducing greenhouse gas emissions.

===== Impact of climate change on health =====
Increased temperatures, wildfires, and drought are major issues in regard to the health of Aboriginal Australian communities. Heat poses a major risk to elderly members of communities in the North. This includes issues such as heat stroke and heat exhaustion. Many of the rural indigenous communities have faced thermal stress and increased issues surrounding access to water resources and ecological landscapes. This impacts the relationship between Aboriginal Australians and biodiversity, as well as impacts social and cultural aspects of society.

Aboriginal Australians who live in isolated and remote traditional territories are more sensitive than non-indigenous Australians to changes that effect the ecosystems they are a part of. This is in large part due to the connection that exists between their health (including physical and mental), the health of their land, and the continued practice of traditional cultural customs. Aboriginal Australians have a unique and important relationship with the traditional land of their ancestors. Because of this connection, the dangerous consequences of climate change in Australia has resulted in a decline in health including mental health among an already vulnerable population. In order to combat health disparities among these populations, community based projects and culturally relevant mental and physical health programs are necessary and should include community members when running these programs.

==== Traditional knowledge ====
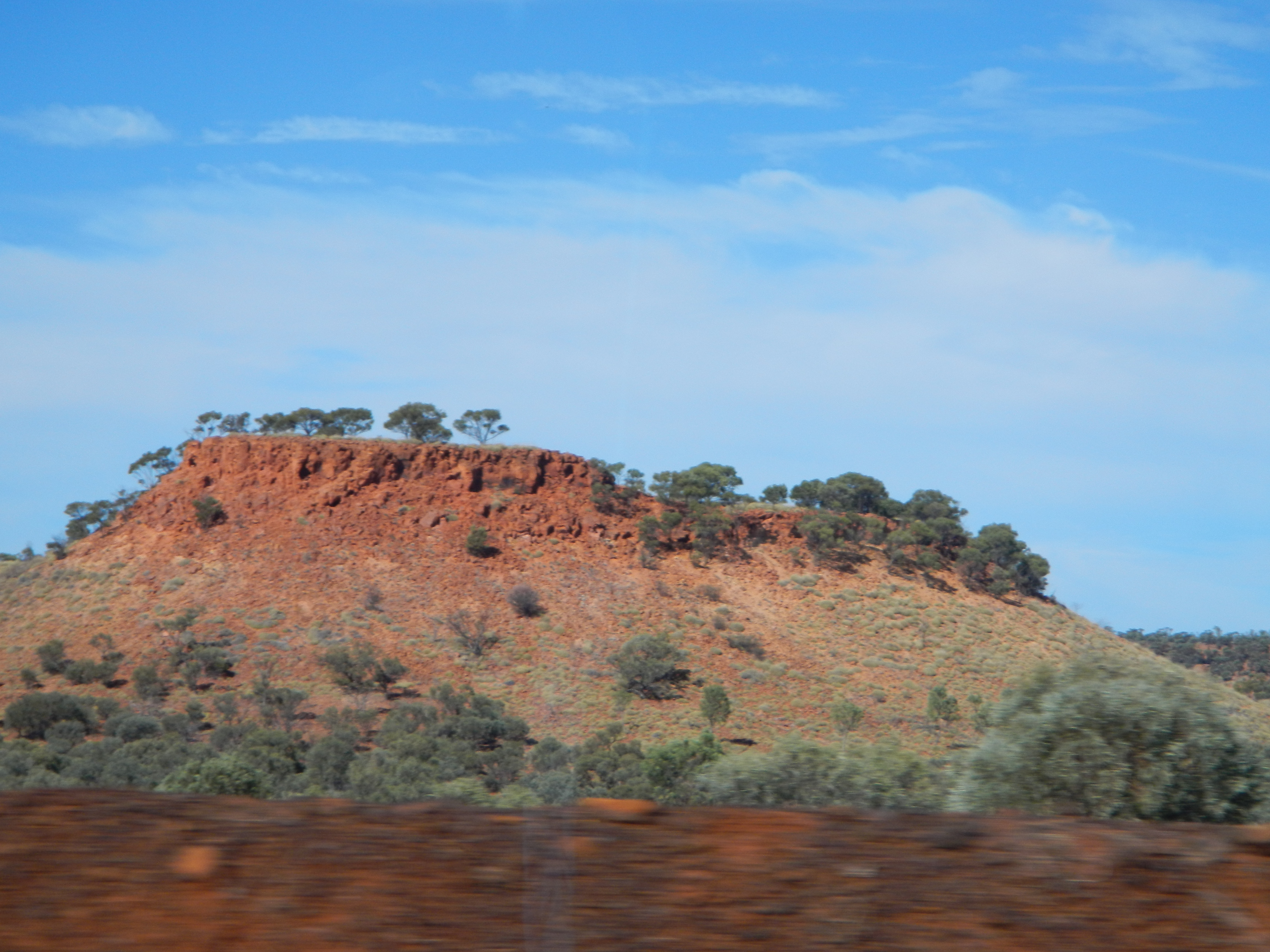
Australian Outback Landscape

Indigenous people have always responded and adapted to climate change, including indigenous people of Australia. Aboriginal Australian people have existed in Australia for tens of thousands of years. Due to this continual habitation, Aboriginal Australians have observed and adapted to climatic and environmental changes for millennia which uniquely positions them to be able to respond to current climate changes. Though these communities have shifted and changed their practices overtime, traditional ecological knowledge exists that can benefit local and indigenous communities today. This knowledge is part of traditional cultural and spiritual practices within these indigenous communities. The practices are directly tied to the unique relationship between Aboriginal Australians and their ecological landscapes. This relationship results in a socio-ecological system of balance between humans and nature Indigenous communities in Australia have specific generational traditional knowledge about weather patterns, environmental changes and climatic changes. These communities have adapted to climate change in the past and have knowledge that non-Indigenous people may be able to utilize to adapt to climate change currently and in the future.

Indigenous people have not been offered many opportunities or provided with sufficient platforms to influence and contribute their traditional knowledge to the creation of current international and local policies associated to climate change adaptation. Although, Indigenous people have pushed back on this reality, by creating their own platforms and trying to be active members in the conversation surrounding climate change including at international meetings. Specifically, Indigenous people of Australia have traditional knowledge to adapt to increased pressures of global environmental change.

Though some of this traditional knowledge was not utilised and conceivably lost with the introduction of white settlers in the 18th century, recently communities have begun to revitalize these traditional practices. Australian Aboriginal traditional knowledge includes language, cultural, spiritual practices, mythology and land management.

==== Responses to climate change ====
Indigenous knowledge has been passed down through the generations with the practice of oral tradition. Given the historical relationship between the land and the people and the larger ecosystem Aboriginal Australians choose to stay and adapt in similar ways to their ancestors before them. Aboriginal Australians have observed short and long term environmental changes and are highly aware of weather and climate changes. Recently, elders have begun to be utilised by indigenous and non-indigenous communities to understand traditional knowledge related to land management. This includes seasonal knowledge means indigenous knowledge pertaining to weather, seasonal cycles of plants and animals, and land and landscape management. The seasonal knowledge allows indigenous communities to combat environmental changes and may result in healthier social-ecological systems. Much of traditional landscape and land management includes keeping the diversity of flora and fauna as traditional foodways. Ecological calendars is one traditional framework used by Aboriginal Australian communities. These ecological calendars are way for indigenous communities to organize and communicate traditional ecological knowledge. The ecological calendars includes seasonal weather cycles related to biological, cultural, and spiritual ways of life.

== Mitigation ==
Energy in Australia by source over time.

Climate change mitigation focuses on steps taken to reduce greenhouse gas emissions. It is the set of preventative measures taken to curb global warming and climate change. Examples would be investing in clean fuel and using renewable energy such as wind and solar power.

According to the CSIRO and Garnaut Climate Change Review, climate change is expected to have numerous adverse effects on many species, regions, activities and much infrastructure and areas of the economy and public health in Australia. The Stern Report and Garnaut Review on balance expect these to outweigh the costs of mitigation.

The World Resources Institute identifies policy uncertainty and over-reliance on international markets as the top threats to Australia's GHG mitigation.

=== Emissions reductions ===
Australia has consistently ranked below most developed countries in the Climate Change Performance Index.

Internationally, Australia pledged as part of the Paris Agreement to reduce emissions by 43% by 2030 and achieve net zero emissions by 2050. Emissions by the electric sector are addressed by renewable energy targets at multiple scales through Australian Renewable Energy Agency (ARENA), the Clean Energy Finance Corporation (CEFC), carbon capture and storage flagships, and feed-in tariffs on solar panels. Emissions by the industrial sector are addressed by the Energy Efficiency Opportunities (EEO) program. In September 2025, the government announced that Australia's 2035 nationally determined contribution target to reduce emissions will be set at 62 to 70 per cent. The government also announced new supports for industries to decarbonise.

The Australian government has also implemented programs that penalise businesses that do not lower their emissions such as the Safeguard Mechanism and the New Vehicle Efficiency Standard, which requires car manufacturers to sell more fuel-efficient and lower-emissions vehicles to avoid penalties.

=== Forestry and forest-related options for carbon sinks ===
In Australia, forestry and forest-related options are the most significant and most easily achieved carbon sink making up 105 Mt per year CO_{2}-e or about 75 per cent of the total figure attainable for the Australian state of Queensland from 2010 to 2050. Among the forestry options, forestry with the primary aim of carbon storage (called carbon forestry) has the highest attainable carbon storage capacity (77 Mt CO_{2}-e/yr) while strategy balanced with biodiversity plantings can return 7–12 times more native vegetation for a 10%–30% reduction of carbon storage performance.

Legal strategies to encourage this form of biosequestration include permanent protection of forests in National Parks or on the World Heritage List, properly funded management and bans on use of rainforest timbers and inefficient uses such as woodchipping old growth forest.

=== Policies and legislation to achieve mitigation ===
==== Paris Agreement ====
The Paris agreement is a legally binding international agreement adopted at the COP 21, its main goal is to limit global warming to below 1.5 °C, compared to pre-industrial levels. The Nationally Determined Contributions (NDCs) are the plans to fight climate change adapted for each country. Every party in the agreement has different goals based on its own historical climate records and country's circumstances. All the goals for each country are stated in their NDC.

Australia's target regarding reductions from 2005 year levels:

- 26–28% reduction of greenhouse gases (GHG) until 2030 from 2005 levels. In 2022 the new Australian government officially declared the update of the targets to 43% reduction by 2030 and net zero emissions by 2050.
- Gases covered in reductions: Carbon dioxide (CO_{2}), Methane (CH_{4}), Nitrous oxide (N_{2}O), Hydrofluorocarbon (HFCs), Perfluorinated compound (PFCs), Sulfur hexafluoride (SF_{6}) and Nitrogen trifluoride (NF_{3}).

Countries have different ways to achieve the established goals depending on resources. Australia's developed approach to support the NDC climate change plan is the following:

- Enabling new technologies with low emissions and promoting economic growth.
- Establish regional hydrogen exports to strengthen the country's industry and fund research in the field and enable distribution.
- Improve charging and refueling infrastructure to enable companies and fleets to integrate new more sustainable vehicle technology.
- The country has created a development fund whose purpose is for projects concerning carbon dioxide capture. The fund is for storage, use and carbon capture.
- Investments in technological development that reduces emissions in the sectors of agriculture, industry, transport and manufacturing.
- Climate solution package to increase investment in projects to generate clean energy. The package also includes extra funds to support development in the hard-to-reach sectors.
- Australia has a legalised obligation for the major emitting sectors in the country where the emissions are to be kept below their baseline.

Australia has through funds such as Australia emission reduction fund contributed with 60 million tonnes reduction of greenhouse gases. The fund enables businesses to earn carbon credits. This is done by storing or preventing emissions through new sustainable techniques.

==== State legislation ====
===== Victoria =====
The Climate Change Act was adopted in 2017 and is part of a broader Victorian environmental legislation taking climate change into account. It establishes a net-zero emission target by 2050 and interim targets set every five years to adapt and keep Victoria on track with the 2050 goal.

== Adaptation ==
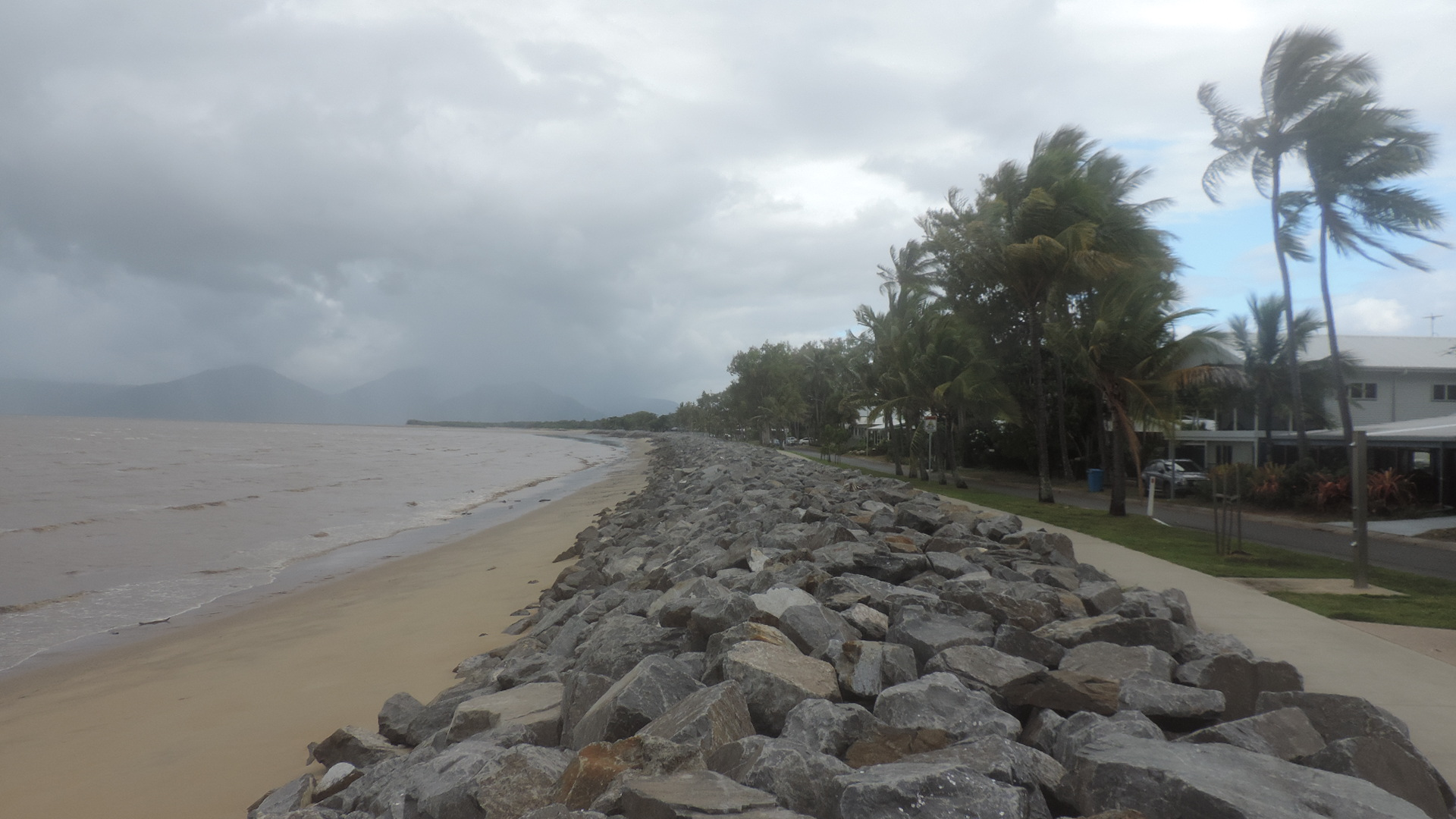
Seawall in Machans Beach, Queensland

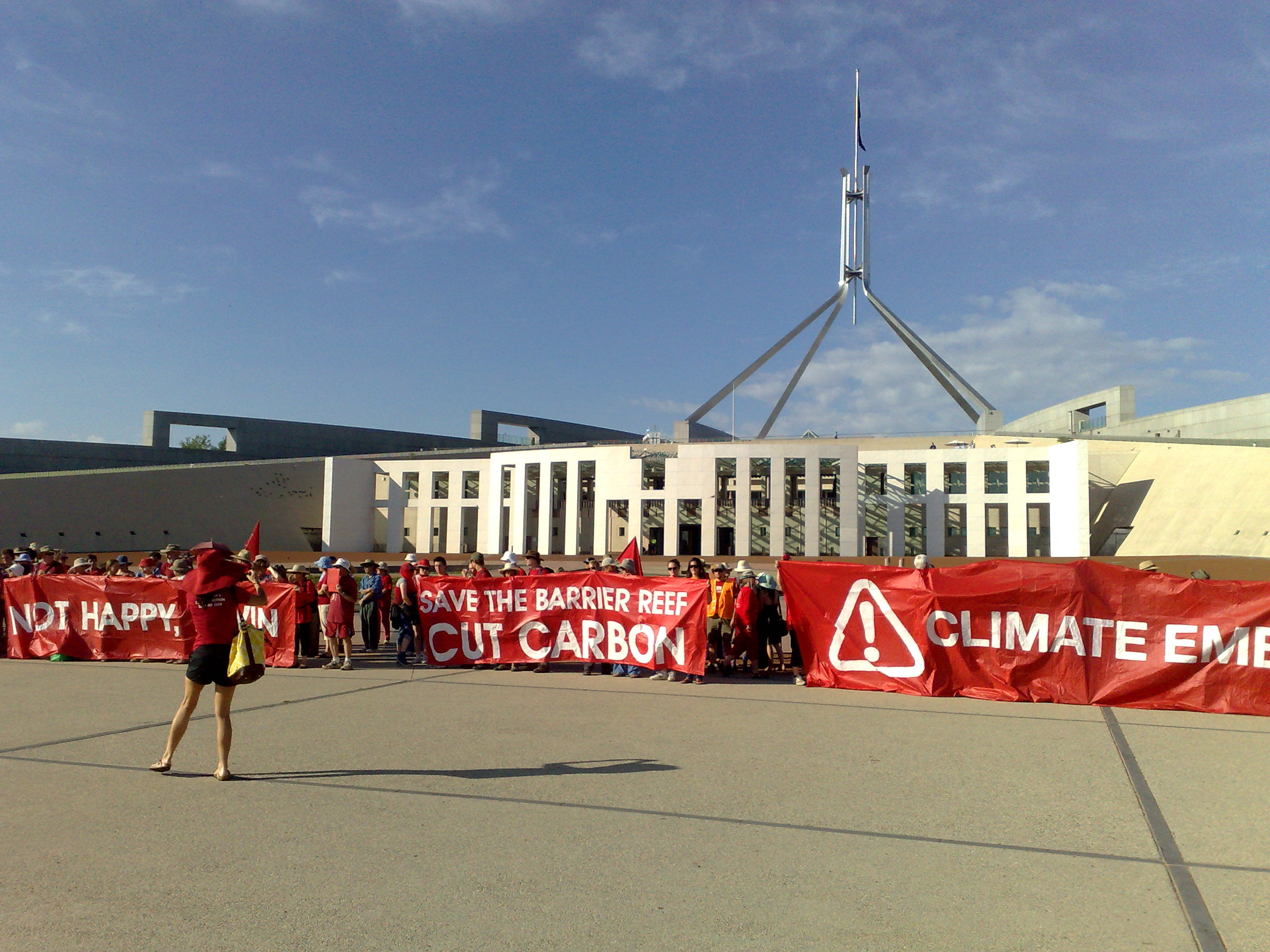
Protesters from the Climate Action Summit outside of Parliament House, Canberra in 2009.

According to the IPCC's 2001 Assessment Report, no matter how much effort is put into mitigating climate change, some amount of climate change cannot be avoided. The report shared that climate change adaptation should complement mitigation efforts. Adaptation is the approach that focuses on alleviating current problems brought about by global warming and climate change. It is the attempt to live with the changes in the environment and the economy that global warming has generated and will continue to generate. In short, it involves taking action to deal with the problems brought about by global warming and climate change. Examples include building better flood defences and avoiding the building of residential areas near low-lying, flood-prone areas. In cities with a proven vulnerability to climate change, investment is likely to require the strengthening of urban infrastructure, including storm drain systems, water supply and treatment plants, and protection or relocation of solid waste management and power generation facilities.

Coastal regions are likely to need large investment in physical infrastructure projects, specifically projects related to the effects of rising sea levels. Projects such as the construction of protective barriers against rising sea levels, the building of dams to retain and manage water, the redesign and development of port facilities and the improvement of the defence systems at coastal areas should be carried out.

Federal, state and territory policy makers have supported a National Biodiversity and Climate Change Action Plan that works to adapt to the impacts of climatic change and manage the effects on wildlife.

=== National government programs ===
==== Regional natural resource management (NRM) organisations ====
Federal natural resource goals, government agencies and non-government organizations established 56 regional natural resource management (NRM) organisations beginning in the mid-1990s. NRM organisations fall under the federal government Natural Heritage Trust. NRM operate according to individual constitutions, usually by the state government and others by community associations. Their boards are appointed by either the local government or community stakeholders. NRM Planning for Climate Fund, put $13.6 million toward helping NRMs plan land use in light of climate change by building a base of detailed climatic information.

==== National Climate Change Adaptation Programme ====
The Minister for Energy and Emissions Reduction has come up with the National Climate Change Adaptation Programme which aims to work with industries, scientific organisations, residents and other governments to create workable solutions. Some A$14 million over a period of four years (2008–2012) is to be spent on this initiative. The programme has forged strong research links in at-risk areas such as the Great Barrier Reef. Research conducted in the Great Barrier Reef is focused on developing methods to deal with climate change to protect the reef. It is hoped that this work will create a universal model for sustainable, cost-effective reef development. According to the programme's brochure: "National greenhouse mitigation policies and programmes are projected to reduce emissions by 94 million tonnes by 2010 – the equivalent of removing every motor vehicle in Australia from the road! However, the greenhouse gases already in the atmosphere and the growing emissions from around the world will affect our climate. Adaptation to climate change will complement action to reduce greenhouse gases".

==== Climate Adaptation Flagship ====
The Australian Commonwealth Scientific and Industrial Research Organisation (CSIRO) started the Climate Adaptation Flagship. Its aim is "enabling Australia to adapt more effectively to the impacts of climate change and variability and informing national planning, regulation and investment decisions". This is part of the National Research Flagships Program. It is designed to bring various stakeholders, i.e. research companies, industries, international connections, eminent scientists and CSIRO, together in hope of delivering practical solutions that address the pressing issues of Australia.

The Climate Adaptation Flagship project concerns both climate variability (or non-human causes, as defined by the United Nations Framework Convention on Climate Change) and climate change. The research budget for this Flagship for the year 2008–09 is close to A$30 million. There are four research prongs to this project: Pathways to adaptation; Sustainable cities and costs; Managing species and natural ecosystems; Adaptive primary industries, enterprises and communities.

==== National Climate Change Adaptation Research Facility ====
The National Climate Change Adaptation Research Facility (NCCARF) is hosted by Griffith University in Queensland and "leads the research community in a national interdisciplinary effort to generate the information needed by decision-makers in government and in vulnerable sectors and communities to manage the risks of climate change impacts".

The key roles of NCCARF include:

- developing National Adaptation Research Plans to identify critical gaps in the information available to decision-makers
- synthesising existing and emerging national and international research on climate change impacts and adaptation and developing targeted communication products
- undertaking a program of Integrative Research to address national priorities, and
- establishing and maintaining Adaptation Research Networks to link together key researchers and assist them in focusing on national research priorities.

The facility is a partnership between the Australian government's Department of Climate Change and Griffith University, with a consortium of funding partners and universities drawn from across the country.

==== The Local Adaptations Pathway Program ====
The Australian government is of the view that local government is critical in managing the impacts of climate change and seeks to assist local councils in studying and applying adaptation options. The programme is the Australian government's initiative to enable councils to go through climate change risk assessments and come up with action plans to prepare for the impacts the phenomenon may have on local society. Up to A$50,000 will be released. A list of councils successful in procuring the funding is provided on the programme's website.

=== Adaptation at workplaces ===
Workplaces can also be adapted to deal with issues such as heat increases and associated issues such as bushfire smoke. Labor unions can play a role educating workers about associated occupational health and safety responses as well as pressure employers and governments to introduce improved standards.

== Policies and legislation ==
Fossil Fuels and the Greenhouse Effect
November 1981

Carbon dioxide emitted by fossil fuels enters the atmosphere... Scientists now agree that if such emission continues it will some time in the next century lead to a discernible 'greenhouse effect' whereby the earth's atmosphere becomes measurably warmer with related climatic changes.
... (T)he carbon dioxide problem is likely sooner or later to arouse public concerns and so engage the attention of governments. ... Public attention to the problem is likely to increase as scientific research results are published and are sensationalised by the press and others.

— Michael Cook, Director-General
Office of National Assessments (intelligence agency)

In November 1981, the Office of National Assessments (intelligence agency) presented prime minister Malcolm Fraser with a classified-confidential assessment noting scientific acceptance of the greenhouse effect and resultant "measurably warmer" temperatures and "related climatic changes", and also projecting effects of possible doubling and quadrupling of atmospheric CO_{2} levels by the middle and end of the 21st century. The assessment focused on the implications for the country's fossil fuel industry.

In the late 1980s and early 1990s, there was clear Australian consensus about the need for action on climate change between the two major political parties. However, following the 1991 recession, incoming right wing governments began framing science of climate change as a continuing debate. In 1997, Australia joined the United States as the only countries to not ratify the Kyoto Protocol.

With voters influenced by events like the Millennium drought and 2006 film An Inconvenient Truth, both major parties went to the 2007 election promising action on climate change, with the then opposition leader Kevin Rudd calling climate change the "greatest moral, economic and social challenge of our time". The incumbent Howard government was defeated in a landslide, and the incoming Labor government immediately ratified the Kyoto Protocol.

In August 2009, the Rudd Labor government unsuccessfully attempted to pass its Carbon Pollution Reduction Scheme (CPRS) bill with the support of opposition leader Malcolm Turnbull, who did believe in man made climate change. This caused a political schism within the opposition, primarily along moderate and conservative factional lines, ultimately resulting in the moderate Turnbull being ousted as leader in an internal party leadership ballot by 1 vote, losing to and being replaced by conservative Tony Abbott, who did not believe in climate change. Abbott vowed to oppose Rudd's CPRS at any cost.

With the main opposition no longer cooperative under their new leader, the Rudd Labor government attempted to pass the CPRS a second time in December with the support of the minor left wing Greens party. The Greens voted against it, claiming that Rudd's scheme was too weak and potentially locked in failure. Hence, the Greens ended up voting on the same side as the climate denialist main opposition led by Abbott, but for opposing reasons.

The two failed attempts at passing the CPRS through the Senate gave Prime Minister Rudd a trigger for a potential double dissolution election in 2010. He opted not to use it and eventually chose to defer the legislation.

In 2010, the Rudd government decided to delay the implementation of the Carbon Pollution Reduction Scheme (CPRS) until the end of the first commitment period of the Kyoto Protocol (ending in 2012). They cited the lack of bipartisan support for the CPRS and slow international progress on climate action as the reasons for the decision. In turn, the delay was strongly criticised by the Federal Opposition as well as community and grassroots action groups such as GetUp.

News of the government retreating on its climate change policy resulted in a fall in popularity for the Labor Party and a substantial fall in the personal popularity of Kevin Rudd.

Following the unsuccessful Copenhagen Summit, Rudd was replaced by Gillard as party leader and prime minister in an internal leadership ballot in June 2010. Gillard led Labor to the 2010 election and stated in the final week of the campaign that "there will be no 'carbon tax' under the government I lead".

The election resulted in a hung parliament. The main opposition led by Abbott and Gillard's Labor government ended up tied on 72 seats each in a parliament of 150. Gillard eventually secured victory through successful negotiations with 4 out of 6 crossbenchers, eventually defeating Abbott by the narrowest possible margin at 76-74. One of the crossbench parties was the minor left wing Greens party, which would eventually play a role in forcing her into an unpopular policy position on carbon pricing, in turn playing a role in her downfall a few years later.

Among countries that emit high levels of greenhouse gas, Australia is among the highest per person emitters.

The Gillard Labor government established several government entities to manage Australia's response to climate change:

1. The Climate Change Authority, an independent statutory body that provides advice and performs research for the federal government on climate change.
2. The Clean Energy Regulator, an independent statutory body that administers federal government schemes to measure and reduce Australia's greenhouse gas emissions.
3. The Australian Renewable Energy Agency (ARENA), a corporate body that manages renewable energy programs.
4. The Clean Energy Finance Corporation (CEFC), a government-owned corporation that invests in clean energy technologies.

In 2011, Parliament passed the Clean Energy Act 2011, which introduced carbon pricing in Australia, colloquially known as a 'carbon tax'. It required large businesses, defined as those emitting over 25,000 tons of carbon dioxide equivalent annually, to purchase emissions permits.

There was enormous combined political pressure on Gillard from her internal opponents as a result of her replacing Rudd as Labor leader and Prime Minister, and from external opponents in the form of the main opposition led by Abbott. This was exacerbated by her prior statements in 2010 promising there would be no carbon tax under her government. This resulted in strong public backlash and poor opinion polling, which ultimately resulted in her being replaced as leader by Rudd in June 2013. Rudd led Labor to a landslide defeat in the 2013 election, which resulted in Tony Abbott becoming the 28th Prime Minister of Australia. Under Abbott's leadership, Australia became the first country to repeal a carbon pricing program.

In September 2015, after persistently poor opinion polling, Abbott was successfully challenged and replaced as party leader and prime minister by Minister for Communications Malcolm Turnbull under the condition that his climate policy would not change. Australia attended the 2015 United Nations Climate Change Conference and adopted the Paris Agreement. In limiting further action on climate change, Australia joined Russia, Turkey and Brazil in citing US President Trump's promise to withdraw from the Paris Agreement.

In 2018, Turnbull proposed the National Energy Guarantee, which attempted to ensure lower energy prices and lower emissions at the same time. The bill was perceived as a compromise that attempted to balance environmental and power price concerns. It ended up being criticised by environmentalists for being too weak on lowering emissions and by conservatives (including within Turnbull's own party) for being too weak on lowering power prices. This triggered another leadership crisis which saw Turnbull replaced by Scott Morrison as leader of the Liberal Party and prime minister. Morrison won the 2019 election with an unchanged climate policy.

In June 2021, the Sustainable Development Report 2021 scored Australia last out of 193 United Nations member countries for action taken to reduce global greenhouse gas emissions, scoring 10 out of 100 in an assessment of fossil fuel emissions, emissions associated with imports and exports, and policies for pricing carbon.

In May 2022, the Coalition lost the federal election to the Labor Party, led by Anthony Albanese. In this election, the Coalition lost many of its affluent inner city seats to teal independents with more progressive electoral platforms on climate change policy. In a machinery of government change, a new Department of Climate Change, Energy, the Environment and Water was established. The new government committed to a 43% reduction in Australia's emissions by 2030 (compared to 2005 levels), and net zero emissions by 2050.

Since then, the Coalition, now in opposition, has undergone multiple political schisms on climate change (broadly along moderate and conservative factional lines) and undertaken a major repositioning of its climate and energy policy. In early November 2025, the Nationals formally abandoned their commitment to reach net-zero emissions by 2050. The Nationals’ move increased pressure on the Liberal Party to settle its position. In November 2025, the Liberal Party formally abandoned its previous commitment to achieve net-zero emissions by 2050.

=== History of climate change policy in Australia ===
Domestic action to address climate change in Australia began in 1989, when Senator Graham Richardson proposed the first greenhouse gas emission reduction target of 20% by 2005. The Australian Government rejected this target. In 1990, Ros Kelly and Jon Kerin announced that the Australian Government would adhere to the goals initially proposed by Richardson but not to any economic detriment.

Australia signed the UNFCCC in 1992. This was followed by the release of the National Greenhouse Response Strategy (NGRS), which provided states and territories with the mechanisms to adhere to UNFCCC emission guidelines. Australia attended the first session of the Conference of the Parties to the UNFCCC in Berlin in March 1995. Throughout the 1990s, Australia regularly failed to meet its own emission targets and those set by the UNFCCC.

In 1997, Prime Minister John Howard announced that by 2010, an additional 2% of electricity would be sustainably sourced. The following year, the Australian Greenhouse Office (AGO) was established to monitor greenhouse gas reductions. The AGO later combined with the Department of Environment and Heritage. In April 1998, Australia became a party to the Kyoto Declaration. The Declaration was ratified in 2007 under Prime Minister Kevin Rudd.

In the Renewable Energy (Electricity) Act 2000, the Federal Government introduced the Mandatory Renewable Energy Target program, which aimed to sustainably source 10% of electrical energy by 2010. In 2011, the Mandatory Renewable Energy Target program was divided into the Large-Scale Renewable Energy Target and the Small-Scale Renewable Energy Scheme. In January 2003, the New South Wales State Government implemented the Greenhouse Gas Reduction Scheme (GGRS), which allowed carbon emissions to be traded.

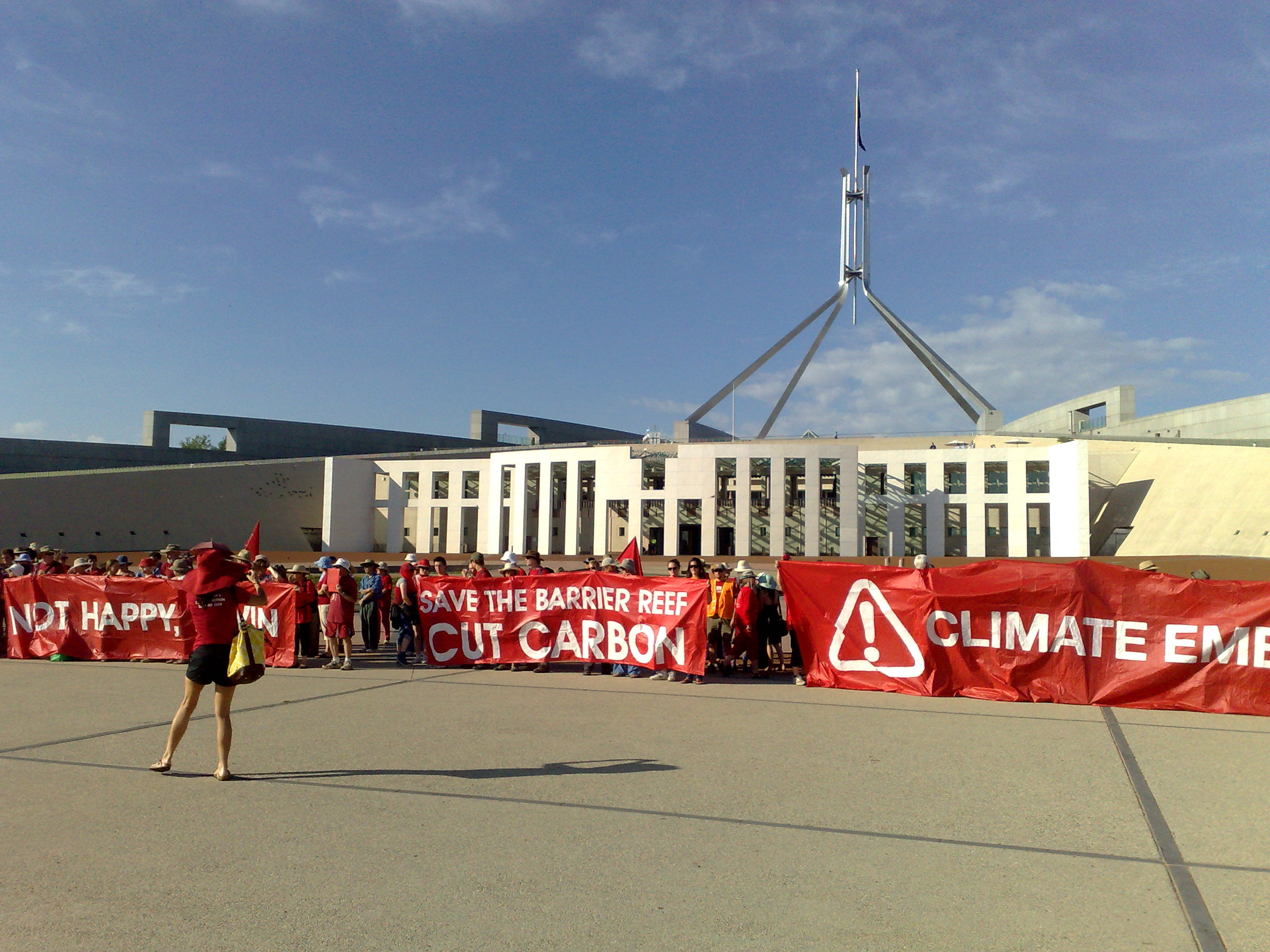
Protests against the CPRS in 2009

Under Rudd, the Labor Government proposed the Carbon Pollution Reduction Scheme, which was intended to take effect in 2010. This scheme was rejected by the Greens for being too permissive and by Tony Abbott's Coalition for being economically detrimental. Under Prime Minister Julia Gillard, the Labor Party passed the Clean Energy Act 2011 to establish a carbon tax and put a price on greenhouse gas emissions. This carbon tax was a divisive partisan issue.

In 2012, the Coalition ran a campaign to repeal the carbon tax. Upon election victory in September 2013, Prime Minister Tony Abbott passed the Clean Energy Legislation (Carbon Tax Repeal) Bill. In replacement of the carbon tax, Abbott introduced the Direct Action Scheme to financially reward businesses for voluntarily reducing their carbon emissions. This was followed by a decision not to participate in the 19th session of the Conference of the Parties to the UNFCCC (COP-19).

Australia became a party to the Paris Agreement in 2015. In the agreement, Australia committed to reducing its emissions by 26% by 2030.

In 2019, Prime Minister Scott Morrison was criticised for a lack of commitment to addressing climate change while taking a vacation during the 2019 bushfires.

=== International cooperation ===
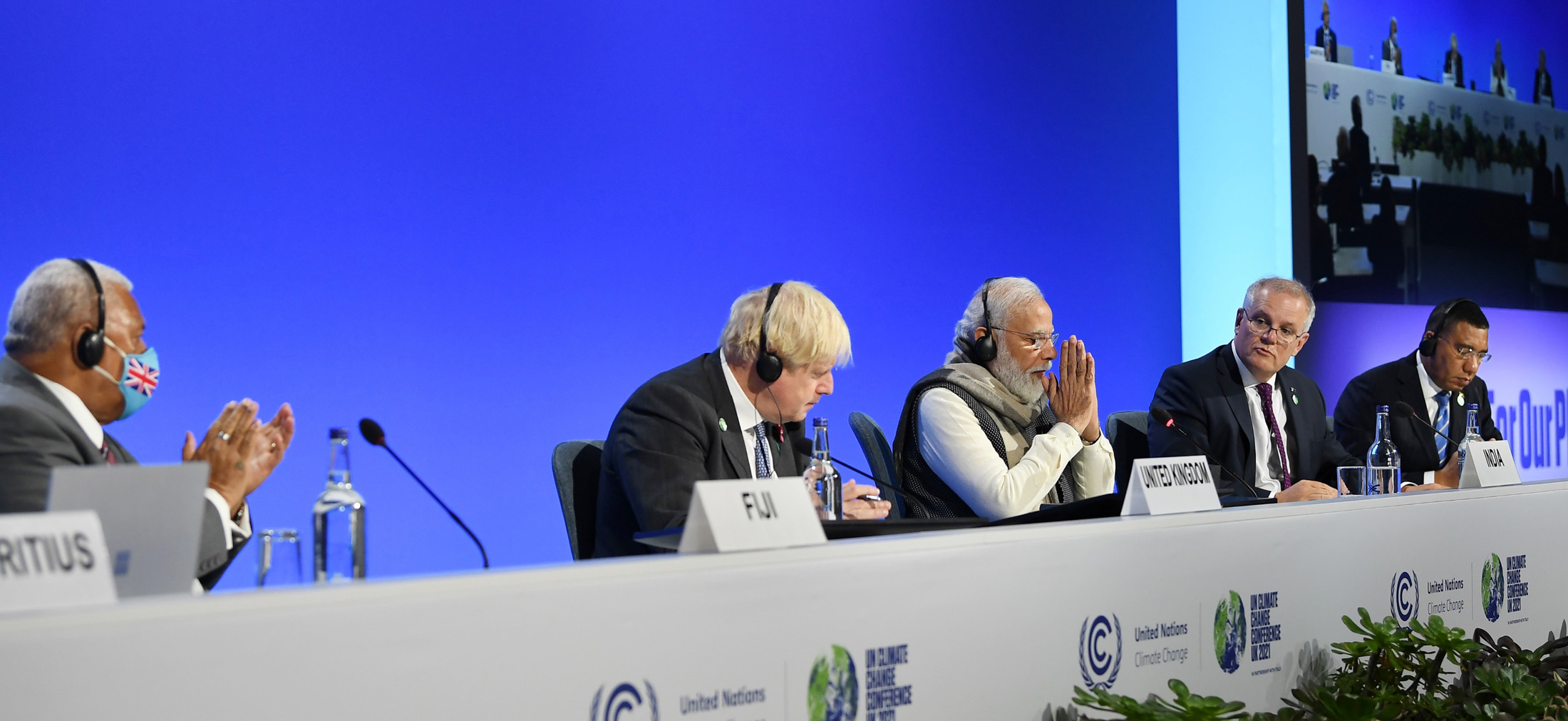
Australian Prime Minister Scott Morrison (second from right) seated with Frank Bainimarama, Boris Johnson, Narendra Modi and Andrew Holness, at COP26.

Internationally, Australia contributed to the creation of the Asia Pacific Rain Forest Partnership, International Coral Reef Initiative, International Partnership for Blue Carbon, Mission Innovation, Clean Energy Ministerial Forum, International Solar Alliance, and the Kigali Amendment to the Montreal Protocol. The government has also provided $1 billion to assist developing countries in reducing GHG emissions, partly through the United Nations Framework Convention on Climate Change Green Climate Fund. Australia's scientists also provide data on climate, emissions, impacts, and mitigation options for the Intergovernmental Panel on Climate Change assessments.

Under the Paris Agreement, Australia has committed to reducing emission by 26-28% below 2005 levels. This would mean reducing emissions by half per capita and by two-thirds across the economy. The Department of Environment and Energy noted in a 2017 review that no one policy could achieve what multiple, sector-specific ones have. This approach has manifested in Australia meeting its first Kyoto Protocol target. Australia is now bound to reducing emissions to at least 5% by 2020 under the Copenhagen Accord and Cancun Agreements and 0.5% less than 1990 levels by 2020 under their second target for the Kyoto Protocol.

While Australia opposed a 1.5 °C target at the 2015 negotiations for the Paris Agreement, in 2019, they supported the Kainaki II Declaration of the Pacific Islands Forum, which included this target. In 2022, Australia discussed hosting COP29 with its Pacific island neighbours in 2024 at the Pacific Islands Forum.

In November 2023 it was announced that Australia will offer 280 Tuvalu citizens displaced by climate change permanent residency in Australia per year, as part of a broad bilateral deal.

== Society and culture ==
=== Politics ===
Australia is second only to the United States in the degree of internal political division about the seriousness of climate change, with right-wing opinion being more negative than most other nations.

Despite the support of a clear scientific consensus, climate change has been a divisive or controversial issue in Australian politics since the 2000s. It has sometimes been referred to as a "culture war" in the country. Conservatives have generally opposed climate mitigation policies and renewable energy, instead favouring or supporting the country's coal and fossil fuels industries, which make up a large part of the economy. Proposed carbon pricing during the premiership of Julia Gillard proved highly divisive, and was later repealed under Tony Abbott. Climate change was a key issue in the 2022 federal election, where the Australian Labor Party and teal independents made gains in part due to promoting environmental policies.

Australian conservatives, with the support of strongly climate-skeptical media, have long opposed climate change mitigation and changes to energy policy. This is partly a strategy to foster the support of the country's coal and the fossil fuel industry, which are highly influential and a large employer in the country.

=== Activism ===
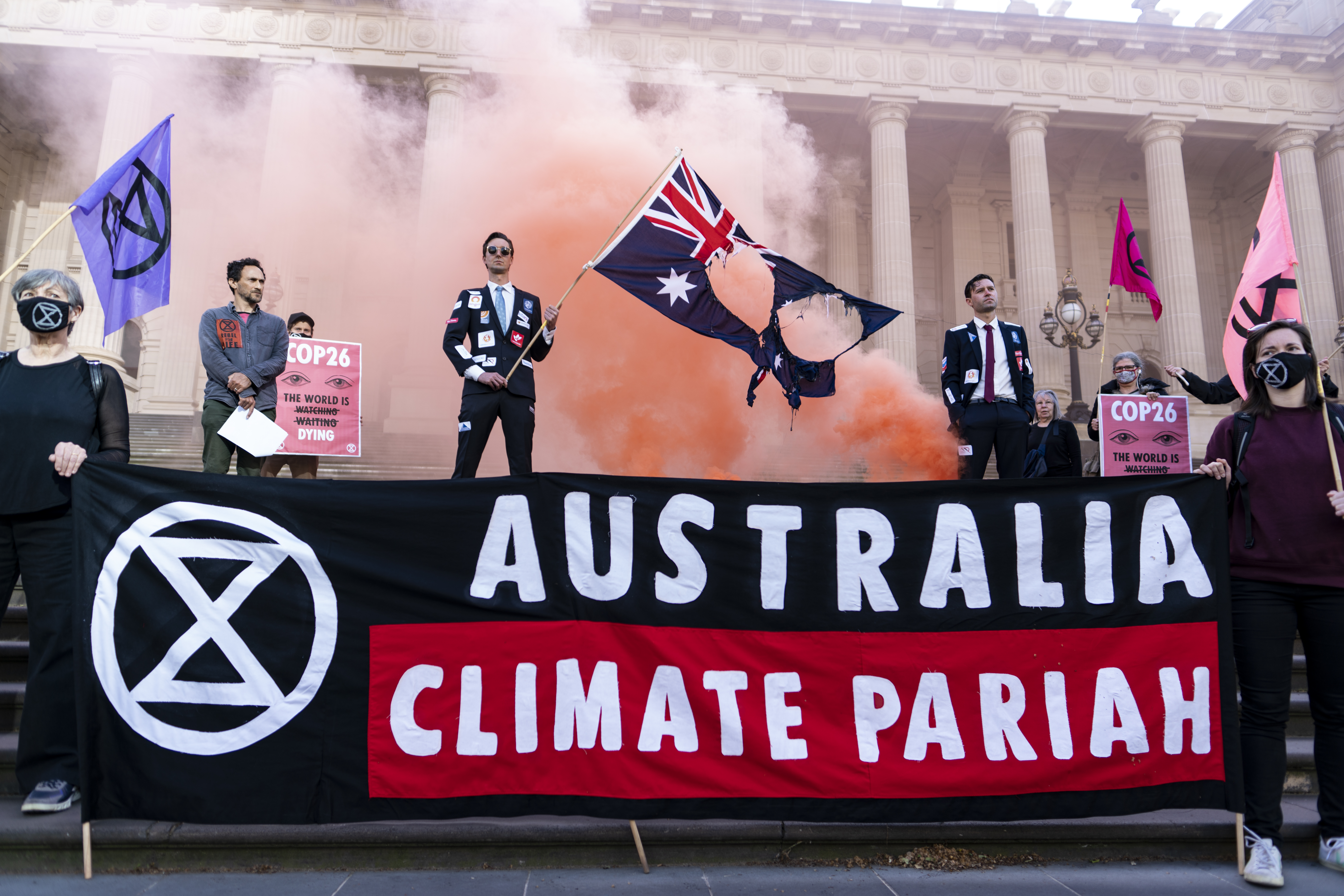
Extinction Rebellion protesting Australia's climate change policies at the Victorian Parliament, Melbourne, in 2021

Climate change protests have taken place in Australia during the 21st century.

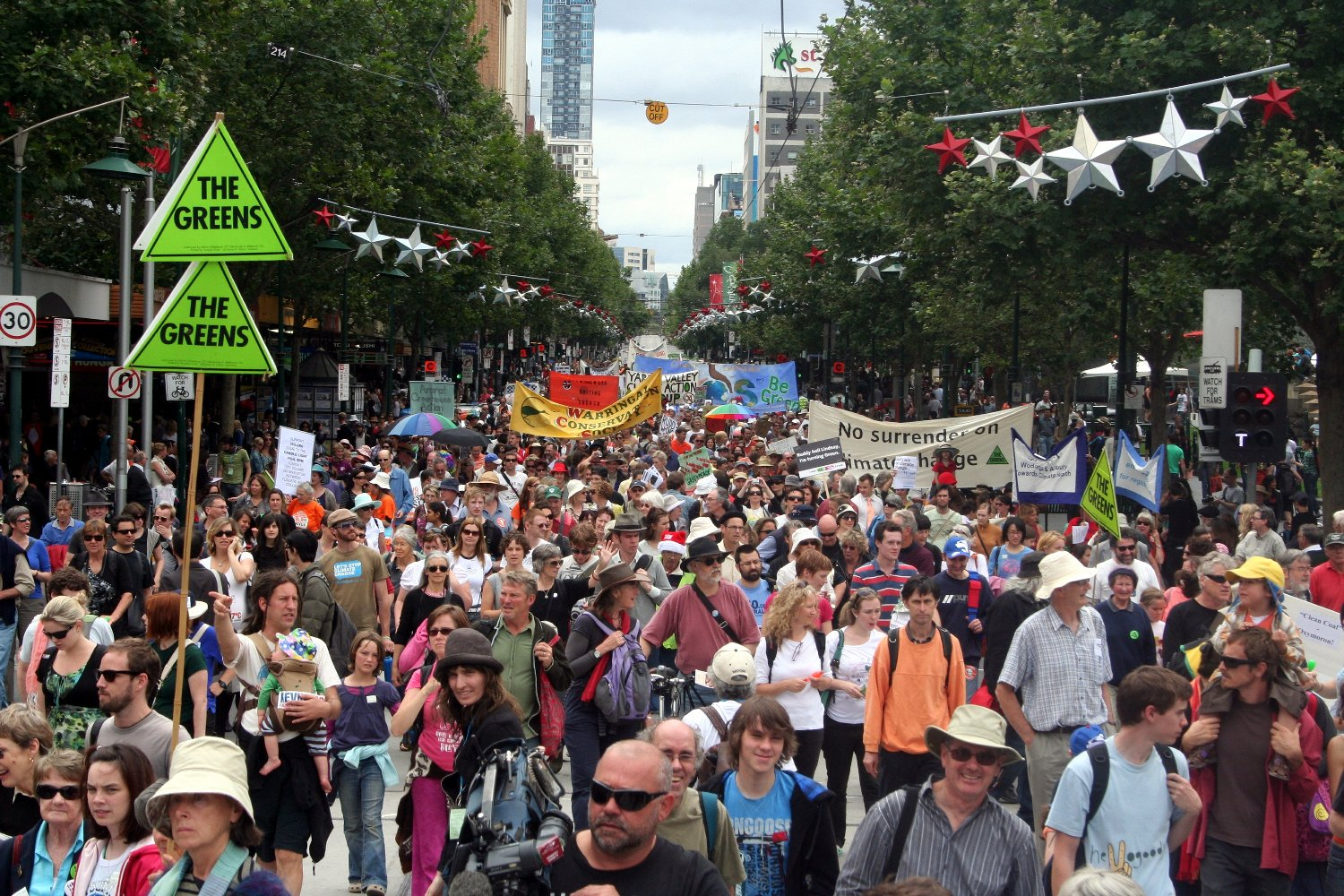
Walk Against Warming in Melbourne, December 2009

In 2005, with support from Uniting Church and Catholic Earthcare, the Australian Conservation Foundation and the National Council of Churches Australia produced a brochure, Changing Climate, Changing Creation, which was distributed to churches across the country to call for action on climate change.

Rising Tide Australia held environmental direct action protests in February 2007, where more than 100 small and medium-sized craft, including swimmers and people on surfboards, gathered in Newcastle harbour. Young people from the Real Action On Climate Change shut down two coal-fired power stations in September 2007. A 2009 "Walk Against Warming" drew 40,000 participants in Melbourne.

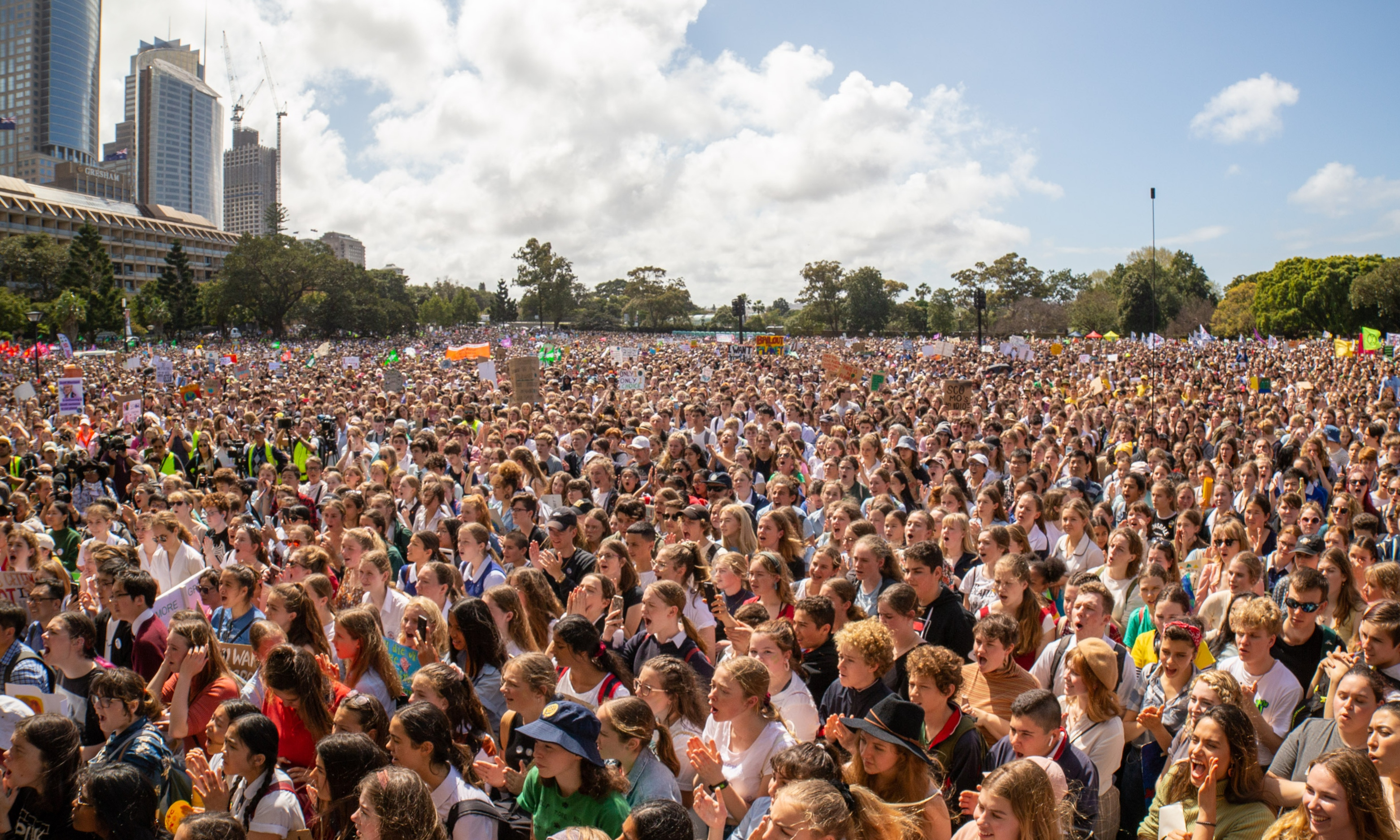
The September 2019 climate strike in Sydney. The protests were among the largest in Australian history.

The Say Yes demonstrations took place on 5 June 2011, in which 45,000 people demonstrated in every major city nationwide in support of carbon pricing policies. Thousands of Australian children took part in school strikes for climate in 2018 and 2019. The September 2019 climate strikes attracted an estimated 180,000 to 300,000 participants across eight Australian capital cities and 140 urban centres, making it one of the largest protests in the country's history and one of the largest climate protests globally. Approximately 2,500 businesses also took part.

The response to the 2019–20 Australian bushfire season sparked protests in Sydney, Canberra, Melbourne, Victoria, Brisbane, Hobart, and outside the Australian High Commission in London. Prime Minister Scott Morrison was criticised for climate denial in the wake of the bushfires. Extinction Rebellion held rallies in London, Berlin, Madrid, Copenhagen and Stockholm calling for stronger climate action. Direct action group Blockade Australia began disruptive activism in 2021 and 2022. In 2023 another Rising Tide water blockade was held in Newcastle during which 3000 people took part and 109 were arrested. In line with its strategy of using mass mobilizations to bring more people into action Rising Tide held another blockade in 2024, which attracted 7000 participants. Despite the introduction of tougher penalties in New South Wales for such activity the majority of those facing court received dismissals with no conviction with magistrates acknowledging the protesters as "valuable contributors to society" and commending their "muscular good character.

In November 2025, Rising Tide held its annual "People's Blockade", again targeting coal shipments at the world's largest coal port in Newcastle. Thousands gathered as protesters arrived from across Australia for what organizers described as a national gathering of citizens frustrated by the government's lack of urgency on climate change. Using kayaks, canoes, and small boats, protesters blocked at least three bulk carriers, and 156 participants were arrested for breaching the state's maritime exclusion zone. Organizers called for an end to new coal developments, fairer transition for affected workers, and higher taxes on fossil fuel export profits. The blockade also featured a waterfront concert, workshops and panel discussions, and was described as a "protestival" to engage participants of all ages.

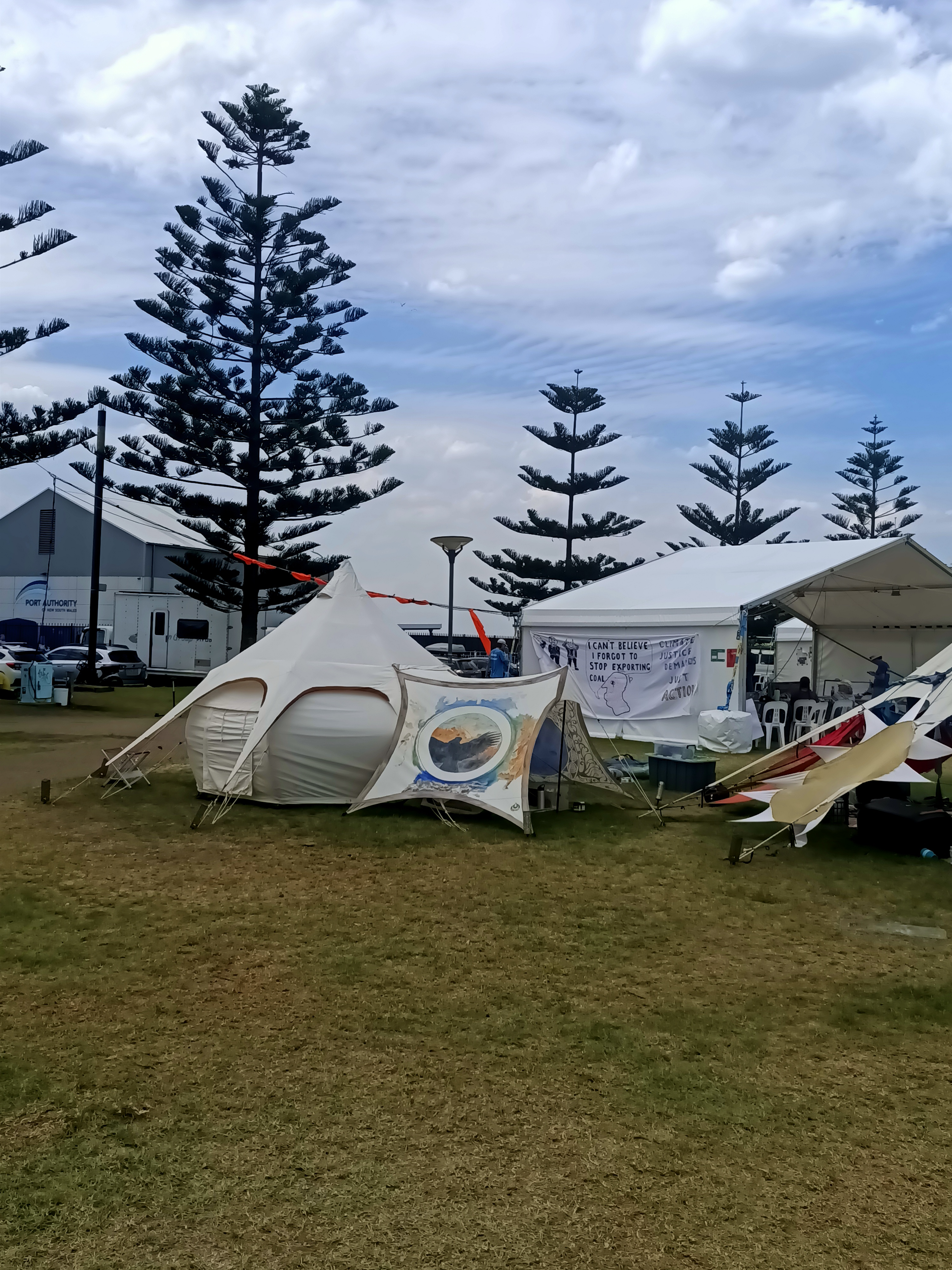
View of part of the 2025 Rising Tide blockade camp at Foreshore Park.

=== Litigation ===
Groups including Rising Tide and Queensland Conservation have initiated legal challenges to coal mines under the Commonwealth EPBC legislation. In late 2006, Queensland Conservation lodged an objection to the greenhouse gas emissions from a large coal mine expansion proposed by Xstrata Coal Queensland Pty Ltd. QC's action aimed to have the true costs of the greenhouse gas emissions from coal mining recognised. The Newlands Coal Mine Expansion will produce 28.5 million tonnes of coal over its fifteen years of operation. The mining, transport and use of this coal will emit 84 million tonnes of CO_{2} into the atmosphere. Queensland Conservation aims to have reasonable and practical measures imposed on new mines to avoid, reduce or offset the emissions from the mining, transport and use of their coal. The Land and Resources Tribunal ruled against the case. Strategic litigation using negligence was found to be unsuccessful in the 2025 case of Pabai v Commonwealth.

=== Media coverage ===
Australian news outlets have been reported to present misleading claims and information. One article from The Australian in 2009 claimed that climate change and global warming were fraudulent claims pushed by so-called "warmaholics". Many other examples of claims that dismiss climate change have been posted by media outlets in Australia throughout the years following as well. The 2013 summer and heat wave colloquially known as "Angry Summer" attracted a great deal of media attention, although few outlets directly linked the unprecedented heat to climate change. As the world entered into 2020, global media coverage of climate change issues decreased and COVID-19 coverage increased. In Australia there was a 34% decrease in climate change articles published from March 2020. A 2022 analysis found that Sky News Australia was a major source of climate misinformation globally.

Australia has recently experienced some of the most intense bushfire seasons in its immediate history, often blamed on restrictions on back-burning and land clearance, however the contribution from arson cannot be understated. This phenomenon has sparked extensive media coverage both nationally and internationally. Much of the media coverage of the 2019 and 2020 Australian bushfire seasons discussed the different factors that lead to and increase the chances of extreme fire seasons. A climate scientist, Nerilie Abram, at Australian National University explained in an article for Scientific American, that the four major conditions need to exist for wildfire and those include "available fuel, dryness of that fuel, weather conditions that aid the rapid spread of fire and an ignition.

== Projected impacts by location ==
The impacts of climate change will vary significantly across Australia. The Australian Government appointed Climate Commission have prepared summary reports on the likely impacts of climate change for regions across Australia, including: Queensland, NSW, Victoria and Tasmania.

=== Capital cities ===
==== Adelaide ====
Adelaide will get hotter and drier with rainfall predicted to decline 8% to 29% by 2090 and average temperature to increase between 4 and 0.9 degrees. The number of days above 35 degrees will increase by 50% in 2090 and the number of days above 40 degrees will double. Bringing it close to Northampton, Western Australia, for temperature and Kadina, South Australia, for rainfall.

Sea levels will rise with predictions between 39 and 61 cm by 2090. And extreme seas are predicted to rise as well, with the CSIRO predicting buildings in Port Adelaide would need to be raised by 50 to 81 cm to keep the amount of flooding incidents the same as recorded between 1986 and 2005.

==== Brisbane ====
In a RCP 4.5 scenario Brisbane's temperature will be similar to that of Rockhampton today while rainfall will be closest to Gympie. The CSIRO predicts rainfall in Brisbane will fall between –23% (235 mm) and –4% (45.3 mm) annually by 2090 while temperature will rise between 4.2° and 0.9°. The number of hot days and hot nights will double by 2050, with many people needing to avoid outdoor activity in summer. Further urban growth increases the number of hot nights even further. Hot nights increase deaths amongst the elderly. Rainfall will be deposited in less frequent more intense rain events, fire days will also get more frequent while frost days will decrease. Sea levels are predicted to rise by 80 cm by 2100 and there will be more frequent sea level extremes.

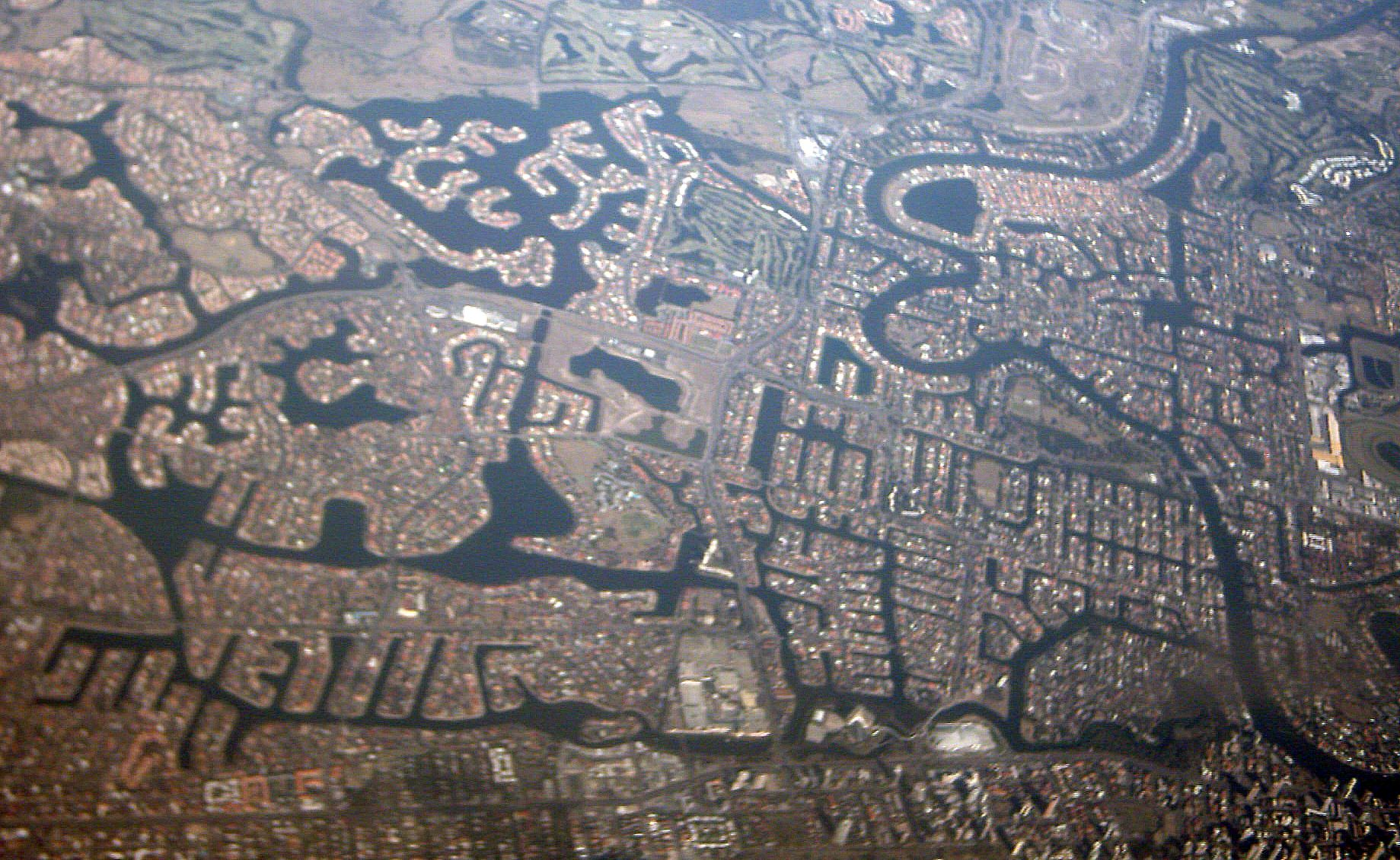
Low-lying canal development on the Gold Coast

==== Darwin ====
In a RCP 4.5 scenario Darwin's temperature will be similar to that of Daly River now, with its rainfall most like that of Milikapiti. In a RCP 8.5 scenario, indicating higher greenhouse gas emissions, Darwin's temperature loses any close comparison in Australia being significantly hotter than every town in Australia is today (with the exclusion of Halls Creek in Autumn).

==== Sydney ====
Suburbs of Sydney like Manly, Botany, Narrabeen, Port Botany, and Rockdale, which lie on rivers like the Parramatta, face risks of flooding in low-lying areas such as parks (like Timbrell Park and Majors Bay Reserve), or massive expenses in rebuilding seawalls to higher levels. Sea levels are predicted to rise between 38 and 66 cm by 2090.

Temperature in Sydney will increase between 0.9° and 4.2°, while rainfall will decrease between -23% and -4% by 2090. Bringing Sydney's climate close to that of Beaudesert today (under a RCP 8.5 scenario). Different parts of Sydney will warm differently with the greatest impact expected in Western Sydney and Hawkesbury, these areas can expect 5 to 10 additional hot days by 2030. Similarly future rainfall patterns will be different to those today, with more rain expected to fall in summer and autumn and less expected in Winter and Spring. Fire danger days will increase in number by 2070.

==== Melbourne ====
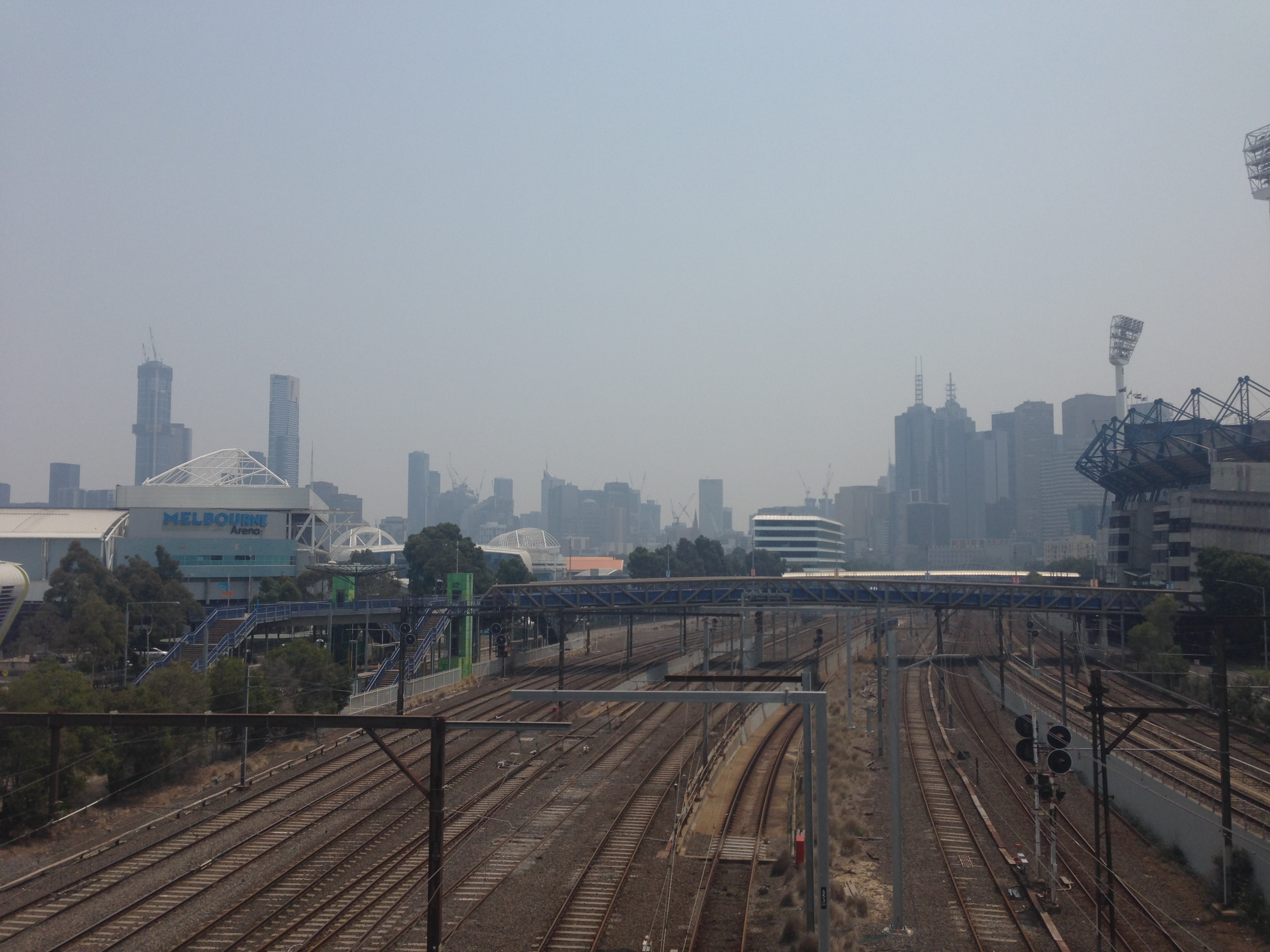
Smog and bushfire smoke over Melbourne during the Black Summer of 2019–20.

Sea levels are projected to rise between 0.37 cm and 0.59 cm at Williamstown (the closest covered point) by 2090. At the higher end of this scale areas in and around Melbourne would be impacted. With some of the most vulnerable areas being the Docklands development and several marinas and berths in Port Phillip. Melbourne's climate will become similar in terms of total rainfall and average temperature to that of Dubbo today, with temperatures warming between 0.9° and 3.8° and total annual rainfall falling between –10% and –4% by 2090. Rainfall patterns will also change with 20% less rainfall predicted during spring in 2050, which may impact the severity of summer bushfires.

The increases in temperature and decrease in rainfall will have a series of follow on effects on the city, including a possible 35% reduction in trees in Melbourne by 2040. And more frequent ambulance callouts and more deaths due to heatwaves. Climate change will cost Melbourne City $12.6bn by 2050 and be closer to Wangaratta's climate.

==== Perth ====
In 2090 Perth is predicted to have the rainfall of Yanchep today and the temperature of Geraldton using the RCP 4.5 scenario. Rainfall is predicted to fall between –29% (-226 mm) and –8% (-66 mm) and temperature predicted to rise between 0.9° and 4°. Perth may see the number of days above 35° increase from 28 per year on average to 36 in 2030, and to between 40 and 63 in 2090. While frost days will decrease. Rainfall will increase in intensity while decreasing on average. Drought days in the south west as a whole may increase by as much as 80% versus 20% for Australia. The danger from fire will increase with more fire days for all of Western Australia.

==== Hobart ====
By 2090 Hobart's climate will warm between 3.8° and 0.9°, rainfall will decline between 4% and 10%. The temperature pattern will be similar to Port Lincoln while rainfall will be closer to Condoblin's today in a RCP 8.5 scenario. Warm spells are likely to last longer and rainfall will trend to more intense rain events dumping less rain annually, increasing the risk of erosion and flooding. Flooding on the Derwent river will become more regular and extreme with a current 1-in-100-year event being possibly a 2-to-6-year event in 2090. Hobart's fire season will get longer.

=== States ===
==== Victoria ====
By 2050, Victoria's annual temperature will increase up to 2.4 °C, with twice the number of very hot days compared to 1986–2005, longer fire seasons, less rainfall and snowfall in cool season and a rise in sea levels about 24 cm.

== Historical aspects ==
=== Pre-instrumental climate change ===
Paleoclimatic records indicate that during glacial maxima Australia was extremely arid, with plant pollen fossils showing deserts as far as northern Tasmania and a vast area of less than 12% vegetation cover over all of South Australia and adjacent regions of other states. Forest cover was largely limited to sheltered areas of the east coast and the extreme southwest of Western Australia.

During these glacial maxima the climate was also much colder and windier than today. Minimum temperatures in winter in the centre of the continent were as much as 9 °C (48 °F) lower than they are today. Hydrological evidence for dryness during glacial maxima can also be seen at major lakes in Victoria's Western District, which dried up between around 20,000 and 15,000 years ago and re-filled from around 12,000 years ago.

During the early Holocene, there is evidence from Lake Frome in South Australia and Lake Woods near Tennant Creek that the climate between 8,000 and 9,500 years ago and again from 7,000 to 4,200 years ago was considerably wetter than over the period of instrumental recording since about 1885. The research that gave these records also suggested that the rainfall flooding Frome was certainly summer-dominant rainfall because of pollen counts from grass species. Other sources suggest that the Southern Oscillation may have been weaker during the early Holocene and rainfall over northern Australia less variable as well as higher. The onset of modern conditions with periodic wet season failure is dated at around 4,000 years before the present.

In southern Victoria, there is evidence for generally wet conditions except for a much drier spell between about 3,000 and 2,100 years before the present, when it is believed Lake Corangamite fell to levels well below those observed between European settlement and the 1990s. After this dry period, Western District lakes returned to their previous levels fairly quickly and by 1800 they were at their highest levels in the forty thousand years of record available.

Elsewhere, data for most of the Holocene are deficient, largely because methods used elsewhere to determine past climates (like tree-ring data) cannot be used in Australia owing to the character of its soils and climate. Recently, however, coral cores have been used to examine rainfall over those areas of Queensland draining into the Great Barrier Reef. The results do not provide conclusive evidence of man-made climate change, but do suggest the following:

- There has been a marked increase in the frequency of very wet years in Queensland since the end of the Little Ice Age, a theory supported by there being no evidence for any large Lake Eyre filling during the LIA.
- The dry era of the 1920s and 1930s may well have been the driest period in Australia over the past four centuries.

A similar study, not yet published, is planned for coral reefs in Western Australia.

Records exist of floods in a number of rivers, such as the Hawkesbury, from the time of first settlement. These suggest that, for the period beginning with the first European settlement, the first thirty-five years or so were wet and were followed by a much drier period up to the mid-1860s, when usable instrumental records started.

=== Development of an instrumental network for climate records ===
Although rain gauges were installed privately by some of the earliest settlers, the first instrumental climate records in Australia were not compiled until 1840 at Port Macquarie. Rain gauges were gradually installed at other major centres across the continent, with the present gauges in Melbourne and Sydney dating from 1858 and 1859, respectively.

In eastern Australia, where the continent's first large-scale agriculture began, a large number of rain gauges were installed during the 1860s and by 1875 a comprehensive network had been developed in the "settled" areas of that state. With the spread of the pastoral industry to the north of the continent during this period, rain gauges were established extensively in newly settled areas, reaching Darwin by 1869, Alice Springs by 1874, and the Kimberley, Channel Country and Gulf Savannah by 1880.

By 1885, most of Australia had a network of rainfall reporting stations adequate to give a good picture of climatic variability over the continent. The exceptions were remote areas of western Tasmania, the extreme southwest of Western Australia, Cape York Peninsula, the northern Kimberley and the deserts of northwestern South Australia and southeastern Western Australia. In these areas good-quality climatic data were not available for quite some time after that.

Temperature measurements, although made at major population centres from days of the earliest rain gauges, were generally not established when rain gauges spread to more remote locations during the 1870s and 1880s. Although they gradually caught up in number with rain gauges, many places which have had rainfall data for over 125 years have only a few decades of temperature records.

== See also ==
- Carbon capture and storage in Australia
- Climate change on agriculture
- Climate Institute of Australia
- Climate of Australia
- Environmental issues in Australia
- Living in the Hothouse: How Global Warming Affects Australia, a 2005 book by Ian Lowe
- El Niño–Southern Oscillation
- Effects of the El Niño–Southern Oscillation in Australia
- New South Wales Greenhouse Gas Abatement Scheme
- Plug-in electric vehicles in Australia
- Solar Cities in Australia
- Sustainable Development Goals and Australia
- Water restrictions in Australia
