= Asia-Pacific Emissions Trading Forum =

The Asia-Pacific Emissions Trading Forum (AETF) was an information service and business network dealing with domestic and international developments in emissions trading policy in Australia and the Asia-Pacific region. The AETF was originally called the Australasian Emissions Trading Forum, and was founded in 1998 under the auspices of the Sydney Futures Exchange following a proposal from Beck Consulting Services. From 2001 until 2011 the AETF published the AETF Review (Bib ID 3998494), held regular member meetings and convened numerous events and conferences. The AETF Review was published six times per year and included original articles on emissions trading developments and related topics.

In 2011 the AETF formed the foundation of the new Carbon Market Institute, a not-for-profit institute, established in Melbourne, Australia to continue and develop the AETF programs.

The AETF was founded to assist all potential stakeholders understand and respond to emissions trading developments both domestically and internationally. Emissions trading is a key element of the Kyoto Protocol and subsequent proposals to manage global greenhouse gas emissions under the United Nations Framework Convention on Climate Change. National or regional schemes are operating in the European Union, New Zealand and the United States and are under active consideration in China, Japan and elsewhere. In Australia, legislation under Clean Energy Future Scheme has been passed to introduce a national emissions trading scheme from 2015.

== Australia’s Clean Energy Future Scheme ==
The policy and legislative background

The current Australian government's Clean Energy Future legislative package represents the culmination of an unprecedented policy development effort in Australia, supported by detailed economic modelling undertaken by the Department of the Treasury (Australia). This package includes a price on carbon from July 2012 transitioning into a national cap and trade scheme from July 2015.

The December 2008 Carbon Pollution Reduction Scheme (CPRS) White Paper was one milestone towards the Government's ultimate policy objective of implementing a cost-effective and forward-looking climate policy, which fully accounts for Australia's particular environmental, economic and geopolitical situation.

Australia's emissions reduction target

The Australian Government in February 2010 submitted its plans for incorporation into the Copenhagen Accord for cutting emissions by the year 2020. Australia will have a 5 per cent reduction target with no conditions applying and will only lift its target to 15 per cent or 25 per cent if countries like China, India and the United States agree to verifiable reductions. This is in line with previous Government announcements on Australian emissions reduction levels.

== See also ==
- American Clean Energy and Security Act
- Carbon Pollution Reduction Scheme
- Carbon Market Institute
- Climate of Australia
- Emissions trading
- European Union Emissions Trading Scheme
- Effects of global warming on Australia
- Garnaut Climate Change Review
- Greenhouse gas
- IPCC Fourth Assessment Report
- Kyoto Protocol
- New Zealand Emissions Trading Scheme
- Stern Review on the Economics of Climate Change
- United Nations Framework Convention on Climate Change
