= Solar thermal energy in Australia =

Australia is well placed to harness solar thermal energy. Solar thermal energy is used in three main ways: solar hot water heating, production of steam for electricity generation and space heating through building design.

== Environmental importance ==
85% of electricity in Australia is generated by coal-fired power stations. They produce 42% of Australia's greenhouse gas emissions. The IPCC has recommended that developed nations such as Australia cut greenhouse gas emissions by 25 to 40% by 2020 and 80 to 95% by 2050. The Garnaut Climate Change Review found that Australia is highly vulnerable to global warming caused by climate change because of the effects of global warming on Australia. The Great Barrier Reef, Kakadu and Murray Darling Basin are all threatened by climate change. Sea level rise threatens much of the highly populated Australian coast line, including the Gold Coast. The Carbon Pollution Reduction Scheme and Mandatory Renewable Energy Target are intended to reduce Australia's emissions and the further development of techniques to harness solar thermal energy are critical to that effort.

== Solar resources of Australia ==
Of all the continents, Australia has the highest average amount of solar radiation per square metre per annum. The amount is from 1500 to 1900 kWh/m2/yr, mainly depending on location. Australia’s total current primary energy consumption of approximately 5500 PJ/a could be met by an area of 4000 km2 of solar collectors with an average of 20% conversion efficiency. If this were built as a power station with a land coverage of 20% it would be 138 × 138 km. The collector area has been described as being approximately the same as the area of domestic house roofs available nationally.

== Research ==
The CSIRO conducts research into solar thermal energy. The newly established UNSW Centre for Energy Research and Policy Analysis also conducts research into solar thermal energy and associated topics.

The ANU Solar Thermal Group at Australian National University in Canberra works on solar thermal energy, with emphasis on high-temperature concentrators, solar air conditioning, and thermochemical energy storage.

== Development ==
=== 2009 Commonwealth budget announcement ===
The Australian Government, under the Clean Energy Initiative and the Solar Flagships Program, will invest $1.5 billion in up to 4 large-scale solar power generation projects. The Program will aim to create an additional 1000 megawatts of solar power generation capacity in Australia. The largest solar energy project currently operating anywhere in the world is only one third of that size.

== Commercial applications ==
=== Domestic ===
==== Solar hot water ====
Australia has a small but long established solar hot water industry.

=== Industrial ===
==== Electricity generation ====
Liddell Power Station had a concentrating solar thermal adjunct to the coal-fired power station. It was designed by Solar Heat & Power, now part of Areva Solar.

Cloncurry, Queensland is to be the site of a 10 MW power station using 8,000 mirrors to reflect sunlight onto graphite blocks. Water pumped through the blocks will be turned into steam to power a conventional steam turbine connected to a generator. The estimated cost is $30 million of which the Government of Queensland has committed $7 miilion. On 24 May 2012 the recently elected Newman government announced the withdrawal of state funds for the project. In a statement the Minister for Energy Mark McArdle described the reason for the scrapping as 'saving the taxpayer's money'.

== See also ==
- Energy in Australia
- Renewable energy in Australia
