= Prime Ministerial Task Group on Emissions Trading =

Prime Ministerial Task Group on Emissions Trading was a Task Group set up on 10 December 2006 by Australian Prime Minister John Howard to develop an Australian Carbon Trading Scheme. The terms of reference of the task group was:

Australia enjoys major competitive advantages through the possession of large reserves of fossil fuels and uranium. In assessing Australia’s further contribution to reducing greenhouse gas emissions, these advantages must be preserved.

Against this background the Task Group will be asked to advise on the nature and design of a workable global emissions trading system in which Australia would be able to participate. The Task Group will advise and report on additional steps that might be taken, in Australia, consistent with the goal of establishing such a system.

The Prime Ministerial Task Group submitted its final report on 31 May 2007. The scheme proposed by the Task Group had some similarities to the "hybrid scheme" developed by Warwick McKibbin.

Prime Minister John Howard announced on 4 June 2007 the government's plan for a carbon trading scheme to be launched in 2012. Howard took the draft carbon trading scheme to the 2007 federal election.

== Background ==
Australian state and territory governments, through the Council for the Australian Federation (CAF) in January 2004 set up a working group to investigate the design of a national emissions trading scheme (NETS). This working group became the National Emissions Trading Taskforce (NETT). NETT reported progress to CAF in December 2004, including the development of 10 key design propositions as a basis for further investigation and analysis of a NETS. After extensive consultations, on 28 August 2006 NETT published its final report. On 9 February 2007 CAF declared:

Premiers and Chief Ministers expressed their expectation that the Prime Minister would make a commitment to the introduction of a national emissions trading scheme following receipt of the Task Group report in May 2007. If the Commonwealth refuses to commit at this time, the States and Territories will introduce an emissions trading scheme by the end of 2010.

On 30 April 2007, the federal Labor Opposition and the Labor-controlled state and territory governments commissioned the separate Garnaut Climate Change Review.

== Membership ==
The Task Group members included:

- Peter Shergold, (Chair) Secretary, Department of the Prime Minister and Cabinet
- David Borthwick, Secretary, Department of the Environment and Heritage
- Peter Coates, Executive Committee Member, Xstrata
- Tony Concannon, Managing Director, International Power
- Ken Henry, Secretary, The Treasury
- Russell Higgins, Non-Executive Director, Australian Pipeline Trust
- Margaret Jackson, Chairman, Qantas
- Michael L'Estrange, Secretary, Department of Foreign Affairs and Trade
- Chris Lynch, Executive Director, BHP Billiton
- John Marlay, Chief Executive Officer, Alumina Limited
- Mark Paterson, Secretary, Department of Industry, Tourism and Resources, and
- John Stewart, Managing Director, National Australia Bank.

== See also ==
- Carbon emissions trading
- Politics of global warming
- Economics of global warming
- Mitigation of global warming
- Greenhouse Mafia

== Further reading and external links ==
- Prime Ministerial Task Group on Emissions Trading
- Prime Ministerial Task Group on Emissions Trading - Final Report
- Industry dominates emissions trading taskforce (The Sydney Morning Herald article)
- Make the polluter pay (Article in The Age by Tim Flannery)
- National Emissions Trading Taskforce
- Prime Ministerial Task Group on Emissions Trading at SourceWatch
