= Clean Energy Act 2011 =

Repealed Act of the Parliament of Australia

Parliament of Australia
- Long title: A Bill for an Act to encourage the use of clean energy, and for other purposes
- Citation: Clean Energy Act 2011 (Cth)
- Passed by: House of Representatives
- Passed: 12 October 2011
- Passed by: Senate
- Passed: 8 November 2011
- Assented to by: Governor-General Dame Quentin Bryce
- Assented to: 18 November 2011
- Commenced: 1 July 2012

Legislative history

Initiating chamber: House of Representatives
- Bill title: Clean Energy Bill 2011
- Bill citation: Clean Energy Bill 2011
- Introduced by: Julia Gillard
- Introduced: 13 September 2011
- Committee responsible: Joint Select Committee on Australia's Clean Energy Future Legislation
- First reading: 13 September 2011
- Considered by the Joint Select Committee on Australia's Clean Energy Future Legislation Committee: 7 October 2011
- Second reading: 11 October 2011
- Consideration in detail: 12 October 2011
- Third reading: 12 October 2011

Revising chamber: Senate
- Bill title: Clean Energy Bill 2011
- Received from the House of Representatives: 12 October 2011
- Member(s) in charge: Joe Ludwig
- First reading: 12 October 2011
- Second reading: 12 October 2011
- Committee of the whole: 8 November 2011
- Third reading: 8 November 2011

Repealed by
- Clean Energy Legislation (Carbon Tax Repeal) Act 2013 (Cth)

Summary
- "Part of a package of 18 bills to implement a carbon pricing mechanism, the bill outlines the structure of, and process for the introduction of, the mechanism by providing for: entities and emissions covered by the mechanism; entities’ obligations to surrender eligible emissions units; limits on the number of eligible emissions units that will be issued; the nature of carbon units; allocation of carbon units; mechanisms to contain costs; linking to other emissions trading schemes; assistance for emissions-intensive, trade-exposed activities and coal-fired electricity generators; monitoring, investigation, enforcement and penalties; administrative review of decisions; and reviews of aspects of the mechanism."

Keywords
- Climate change, carbon pricing
- Status: Repealed

The Clean Energy Act 2011 was an act of the Australian Parliament, the main act in a package of legislation that established an Australian emissions trading scheme (ETS), to be preceded by a three-year period of fixed carbon pricing in Australia designed to reduce carbon dioxide emissions as part of efforts to combat global warming.

The package was introduced by the Gillard Labor government in February 2011 and was repealed by the Abbott government on 17 July 2014, backdated to 1 July 2014 with the passage of the Clean Energy Legislation (Carbon Tax Repeal) Act 2014.

== History ==
=== Rudd government ===
The Gillard Labor Government's legislation followed unsuccessful efforts by the Rudd Labor government to secure passage of an ETS through the Australian Parliament. In opposition, Rudd called climate change "the greatest moral, economic and social challenge of our time" and called for a 60% cut in greenhouse gas emissions by 2050. Both the incumbent Howard government and the Rudd Labor opposition promised to implement an ETS before the 2007 federal election. Labor won the election, and the Rudd government began negotiating the passage of an ETS through Parliament.

The Opposition led by Brendan Nelson called for the vote on the government's ETS be delayed until after the United Nations climate change summit in Copenhagen in December 2009. Rudd said in response that it would be "an act of absolute political cowardice, an absolute failure of leadership not to act on climate change until other nations had done so" and the government pursued the early introduction of the Scheme.

Choosing not to negotiate with the Australian Greens, who did not hold the balance of power in the Senate, the government entered negotiations with the new leader of the Liberal party, Malcolm Turnbull, and in the lead up to the Copenhagen Conference, developed an amended Carbon Pollution Reduction Scheme (CPRS), with Turnbull's support. Following a party revolt by Coalition members opposed to the Scheme, and shortly before the carbon vote, Tony Abbott challenged for the leadership of the Liberal Party and narrowly defeated Turnbull. Thereafter the Coalition opposed the ETS outright and the government was unable to secure the support of any other senators for its CPRS.

Abbott described Rudd's emission trading plan as a "great big tax on everything" and opposed it. Abbott announced a new Coalition policy on carbon emission reduction in February, which committed the Coalition to a 5% reduction in emissions by 2020. Abbott proposed the creation of an 'emissions reduction fund' to provide 'direct' incentives to industry and farmers to reduce carbon emissions.

Following the Copenhagen Conference, Rudd announced the deferral of the scheme and elected not to take the matter to a double dissolution election. In June 2010, Rudd was replaced as leader of the Labor Party in an internal party leadership challenge and Julia Gillard became prime minister. Factional leader and key Gillard supporter Bill Shorten said that the sudden announcement of change of policy on the CPRS was a factor that had contributed to a collapse in support for Rudd's leadership.

=== Gillard government ===
Following her election as party leader, in various policy announcements in the lead up to the 2010 election, prime minister Julia Gillard and treasurer Wayne Swan gave assurances that no carbon tax would be introduced by a Gillard-led government, but that a "citizens' assembly" would be called to sound out public support for a price on carbon.

The 2010 election resulted in a hung parliament in which Gillard secured the support of the Greens and three independents to form a government. On 28 September, in a joint press conference with the Greens, Gillard announced that a citizens assembly would not be held and that instead a "multi-party climate change committee" consisting of Labor, Greens, and Independent members, would examine the issues.

On 24 February 2011, in a joint press conference of the "Climate Change Committee" – comprising the government, Greens, and two independent MPs – Gillard announced a plan to legislate for the introduction of a fixed price to be imposed on carbon pollution from 1 July 2012. The carbon price would be placed for three to five years before a full emissions trading scheme is implemented, under a blueprint agreed by a multi-party parliamentary committee. Key issues remained to be negotiated between the government and the crossbench, including compensation arrangements for households and businesses, the carbon price level, the emissions reduction target and whether or not to include fuel in the tax.

The Gillard government introduced the Clean Energy Bill to parliament in February 2011, which the opposition claimed was a broken election promise. The legislation was approved by the House of Representatives in October 2011 and by the Senate in November 2011.

The Liberal Party vowed to overturn the legislation if elected.

== Mechanism ==
The Act began on 1 July 2012, and operates on a financial year basis. It is administered by the Clean Energy Regulator and the minister for the environment. A carbon pollution cap limits the sum of: (a) the total number of auctioned carbon units; and (b) the total number of free carbon units issued in accordance with the Jobs and Competitiveness Program; and (c) the total number of free carbon units issued to coal-fired electricity generators. If a person (including a corporation) is responsible for covered emissions of greenhouse gas from the operation of a facility, the facility's annual emissions are above a threshold, and the person does not surrender one eligible emissions unit for each tonne of carbon dioxide equivalence of the gas, the person is liable to pay unit shortfall charge. The financial years beginning on 1 July 2012, 1 July 2013, and 1 July 2014 are fixed charge years. In a fixed charge year, carbon units will be issued under the Act for a fixed charge. Later financial years are flexible charge years which involve emissions trading. In a flexible charge year, carbon units will be issued under the Act as the result of an auction plus by means of free allocation to coal fired generators and emissions-intensive trade-exposed (EITE) industries. However, in the flexible charge years beginning on 1 July 2015, 1 July 2016, and 1 July 2017, some carbon units may be issued for a fixed charge (to act as a cap). Furthermore, free carbon units will be issued under the Jobs and Competitiveness Program (which deals with emissions-intensive trade-exposed (EITE) activities). Free carbon units will be issued to coal-fired electricity generators. If a carbon unit was not issued for a fixed charge, the unit is transferable. The Climate Change Authority is charged with conducting periodic reviews of the Act.

=== Impacts ===
Under the scheme, around 500 entities will be required to buy permits for each tonne of CO_{2} emitted. Personal income tax will be reduced for those who earn less than $80,000 per year and the tax-free threshold increased from $6,000 to $18,200.

In February 2012, The Sydney Morning Herald reported that Clean Energy Future carbon price had not deterred new investment in the coal industry, as spending on exploration had increased by 62 percent in 2010–2011, more than any other mineral commodity. The government agency Geoscience Australia reported that investment in coal prospecting reached $520 million in 2010–2011.

== See also ==
- Climate change in Australia
- Economics of climate change mitigation
- List of climate change initiatives
