= Carbon pricing in Australia =

Carbon pricing scheme introduced in 2011

Financial year	Carbon Price* ($/tonne)
2012–13	23.00
2013–14	24.15
1 July 2014 onwards	revoked
Source: Clean Energy Regulator * per tonne of emitted CO_{2}

A carbon pricing scheme in Australia was introduced by the Gillard Labor minority government in 2011 as the Clean Energy Act 2011 which came into effect on 1 July 2012. Emissions from companies subject to the scheme dropped 7% upon its introduction. As a result of being in place for such a short time, and because the then Opposition leader Tony Abbott indicated he intended to repeal "the carbon tax", regulated organizations responded rather weakly, with very few investments in emissions reductions being made. The scheme was repealed on 17 July 2014, backdated to 1 July 2014. In its place the Abbott government set up the Emission Reduction Fund in December 2014. Emissions thereafter resumed their growth evident before the tax.

The carbon price was part of a broad energy reform package called the Clean Energy Futures Plan, which aimed to reduce greenhouse gas emissions in Australia by 5% below 2000 levels by 2020 and 80% below 2000 levels by 2050. Although Australia does not levy a direct carbon price, the plan set out to achieve these targets by encouraging Australia's largest emitters to increase energy efficiency and invest in sustainable energy. The scheme was administered by the Clean Energy Regulator. Compensation to industry and households was funded by the revenue derived from the charge. The scheme required entities which emit over 25,000 tonnes of carbon dioxide equivalent greenhouse gases per year, and which were not in the transport or agriculture sectors, to obtain emissions permits, called carbon units. Carbon units were either purchased from the government or issued free as part of industry assistance measures. As part of the scheme, personal income tax was reduced for those earning less than A$80,000 per year and the tax-free threshold was increased from A$6,000 to A$18,200. Initially the price of a permit for one tonne of carbon was fixed at A$23 for the 2012–13 financial year, with unlimited permits being available from the government. The fixed price rose to A$24.15 for 2013–14.

The government had announced that the scheme was part of a transition to an emissions trading scheme in 2014–15, where the available permits will be limited in line with a pollution cap. The scheme primarily applied to electricity generators and industrial sectors. It did not apply to road transport and agriculture. The Department of Climate Change and Energy Efficiency stated that in June 2013 only 260 entities were subject to the scheme, of which approximately 185 were liable to pay for carbon units. Domestic aviation did not face the carbon price scheme, but was subject to an additional fuel excise levy of approximately 6 cents per liter.

In February 2012, the Sydney Morning Herald reported that Clean Energy Future carbon price scheme had not deterred new investment in the coal industry, as spending on exploration had increased by 62% in 2010–2011, more than any other mineral commodity. The government agency Geoscience Australia reported that investment in coal prospecting reached $520 million in 2010–2011. Falls in carbon emissions were observed following implementation of this policy. It was noted that emissions from sectors subject to the pricing mechanism were 1.0% lower and nine months after the introduction of the pricing scheme, Australia's carbon dioxide emissions from electricity generation had fallen to a 10-year low, with coal generation down 11% from 2008 to 2009. However, attribution of these trends to carbon pricing have been disputed, with Frontier Economics claiming trends are largely explained by factors unrelated to the carbon tax. Electricity demand had been falling and in 2012 was at the lowest level seen since 2006 in the National Electricity Market.

Australia's Greenhouse Gas Emissions	Mt CO_{2} equiv
Sector	Year 2012
Energy – Electricity	190.8
Stationary energy excluding electricity	94.2
Transport	91.5
Fugitive emissions	42.3
Industrial processes	32.3
Agriculture	88.0
Waste	12.8
Total	551.9
Excludes land use, land use change and forestry Source – Australia's National Greenhouse Inventory Dec 2012

== History ==
Economy-wide pricing of carbon is the centre piece of any policy designed to reduce emissions at the lowest possible costs.

— Ross Garnaut

In 2003, the Howard Government was close to creating an emissions trading scheme, but business lobbying caused the government to stop considering it in September of that year. In October 2006 the Stern Review on the effect of climate change on the world's economy was released for the British government. This report recommended a range of measures including ecotaxes to address the market failure represented by climate change with the least amount of economic and social disruption. In response to this report and subsequent pressure from the Kim Beazley led Labor opposition, in December 2006 the Howard government established the Prime Ministerial Task Group on Emissions Trading, chaired by Peter Shergold, to advise on the implementation of an emissions trading scheme (ETS) in Australia. In opposition, Kevin Rudd called for a cut to greenhouse gas emissions by 60% before 2050. Both the incumbent Howard government and the Rudd Labor opposition promised to implement an emissions trading scheme (ETS) before the 2007 federal election. Following the release of the final Shergold report, the Howard government committed to introduce an ETS in June 2007.

Going into the 2007 federal election, the Labor opposition party presented itself as a "pro-climate" alternative to the Government, with Kevin Rudd, who had by then deposed Beazley as leader, famously describing climate change as "the great moral challenge of our generation". Labor differentiated itself from the government by promising an ETS with an earlier start date of 2010 rather than the 2012 timeframe advocated by Howard. It also promised ratification of the Kyoto Protocol, investment in clean coal and renewable energy, and slightly more aggressive targets for renewable energy.

Labor won the election on 24 November 2007, and on 3 December 2007 the Rudd government signed the ratification of the Kyoto Protocol at the 2007 United Nations Climate Change Conference. By ratifying the Kyoto Protocol, Australia committed to keeping emissions to no more than 108% of its 1990 emissions level by 2012. Australia's ratification came into effect on 11 March 2008.

The Rudd government began negotiating the passage of an ETS through the Parliament. The Opposition led by Brendan Nelson called for the vote on the government's ETS be delayed until after the United Nations climate change summit in Copenhagen in December 2009. Prime Minister Rudd said in response that it would be "an act of absolute political cowardice, an absolute failure of leadership not to act on climate change until other nations had done so" and the government pursued the early introduction of the Scheme.

On 16 July 2008, the Rudd government released a green paper for its Carbon Pollution Reduction Scheme (CPRS) (also known as Australia's ETS), outlining the intended design of the scheme. The CPRS was criticised by those who were both for and against action to mitigate climate change. Environmental lobby groups protested that the emissions reductions targets were too low, and that the level of assistance to polluters was too high. Industry and business lobby groups however argued for more permits and assistance to offset the economic impacts of the scheme on many enterprises, particularly during the 2008 financial crisis. Malcolm Turnbull became the new Liberal Opposition Leader on 18 September 2008. On 30 September 2008, the Garnaut Climate Change Review, commissioned in April 2007 by Rudd when he was leader of the Opposition, released its final report. Garnaut recommended a price between $20 and $30 per tonne of carbon dioxide (CO_{2}) equivalent with a rise of 4% each year. A more detailed white paper on the CPRS was released on 15 December 2008.

Unable to secure the support of the crossbench for their preferred model, the government entered negotiations with Turnbull, and in the lead up to the Copenhagen Conference, presented an amended CPRS scheme, with the support of Turnbull. The Turnbull-led Opposition supported the CPRS scheme in principle, although at times over 2009 they indicated disagreement with various details including the timing of implementation of the scheme, timing of the vote on the relevant legislation and on the level of assistance to be provided to polluting industries. The Opposition was able to negotiate greater compensation for polluters affected by the scheme in November 2009.

Shortly before the Senate was due to vote on the carbon bills, on 1 December 2009 Tony Abbott replaced Turnbull as leader of the Liberal Party. Abbott immediately called a secret ballot on support for the ETS among coalition MPs, which was overwhelmingly rejected. The Coalition then withdrew their support for the carbon pricing policy and joined the Greens and Independents in voting against the relevant legislation in the Parliament of Australia on 2 December 2009. As the Rudd government required the support of either the Coalition or the Greens to secure passage of the bill, it was defeated in the Senate. Abbott described Labor's ETS plan as a 'Great big tax on everything'.

Abbott announced a new Coalition policy on carbon emission reduction in February 2010, which committed the Coalition to a 5% reduction in emissions by 2020. Abbott proposed the creation of an 'emissions reduction fund' to provide 'direct' incentives to industry and farmers to reduce carbon emissions. In April 2010, Rudd deferred attempts to advance the scheme to at least 2013, opting not to present the legislation to the Senate a second time, creating a trigger for a double dissolution election. In June 2010, Julia Gillard replaced Rudd as leader of the Labor Party and became prime minister. Factional leader and key Gillard supporter Bill Shorten said that the sudden announcement of change of policy on the ETS was a factor that had contributed to a collapse in support for Rudd's leadership.

Shortly afterwards Gillard called a federal election for 21 August 2010. During the election campaign Gillard stated that she supported a price on carbon emissions and that she would prosecute the case for action for as long as she needed to win community support. However, she also indicated that she would not introduce carbon pricing until there was a sufficient consensus on the issue, that any carbon price legislated would not come into effect until after the 2013 election, and she specifically ruled out the introduction of a "carbon tax".

The result of the election left Australia with its first hung parliament in 70 years. To form a majority in the House of Representatives both of the major parties needed to acquire the support of cross-benchers, including the Greens. After two weeks of negotiations Gillard had enough support to gain a majority including the support of the Greens and their single MP in the House, Adam Bandt. Gillard, therefore, remained prime minister and Abbott remained in Opposition. One of the conditions for Greens support was that the formation of a cross-party parliamentary committee to determine policy on climate change. Gillard honoured that agreement and on 27 September 2010 the Multi-Party Climate Change Committee (MPCCC) was formed, its terms of reference including that it was to report to Cabinet on ways to introduce a carbon price. The MPCCC agreed on the introduction of a fixed carbon price commencing 1 July 2012, transitioning to a flexible-price cap-and-trade ETS on 1 July 2015. Initially the price of permits is fixed and the quantity unlimited i.e. there is no cap; the scheme thus functions similarly, and is popularly referred to as a tax.

In February 2011, the government proposed the Clean Energy Bill, which the opposition claimed to be a broken election promise. The Liberal Party vowed to overturn the bill if it was elected.

The Gillard government had asked the Productivity Commission to report on the steps taken by eight major economies to address climate change. In June 2011, the report found that more than 1,000 climate policies were already enacted across the globe. It also supported a market-based carbon price as being the most cost-effective way to reduce emissions. The report's findings were one of the major reasons that support for the carbon tax was provided by independent Tony Windsor. Windsor made it clear that he would not support the clean energy legislation if it included a carbon tax on transport fuels. He did not want to penalise people who lived in rural areas, where there was no public transport as an alternative to private vehicles.

The Clean Energy Plan was released on 10 July 2011. The Clean Energy Bill 2011 passed the Australian House of Representatives in October 2011 and the Australian Senate in November 2011 and was thus brought into law.

On 1 July 2012 the Australian Federal government introduced a carbon price scheme. To offset the impact of the tax on some sectors of society, the government reduced income tax (by increasing the tax-free threshold) and increased pensions and welfare payments slightly to cover expected price increases, as well as introducing compensation for some affected industries. On 17 July 2014, a report by the Australian National University estimated that the Australian scheme had cut carbon emissions by as much as 17 million tonnes, the biggest annual reduction in greenhouse gas emissions in 24 years of records in 2013 as the carbon tax helped drive a large drop in pollution from the electricity sector.

On 17 July 2014, the Abbott government passed repeal legislation through the Senate to abolish the carbon pricing scheme. In its place the government set up the Emission Reduction Fund, paid by taxpayers from consolidated revenue, which according to RepuTex, a markets consultancy, estimated the government's main climate policy may only meet a third of the emissions reduction challenge if Australia is to cut by 5% of 2000 levels by 2020.

== Scope and covered emissions ==
The carbon price came into effect on 1 July 2012 and applied to direct emissions from a facility (scope-1 emissions), but not to indirect emissions (scope-2 emissions). The scheme only applied to facilities which emit more than 25,000 tonnes CO_{2}-e per year, and did not apply to agriculture or to transport fuels. The carbon price was set at AUD$23 per tonne of emitted CO_{2}-e on selected fossil fuels consumed by major industrial emitters and government bodies such as councils.

Agricultural emissions were exempt due to difficulty in tracking emissions and the related complexity of administering such a scheme. Households and business use of light vehicles did not incur a carbon price. However, changes to the fuel tax regime were proposed to effectively impose a carbon tax on business liquid and gaseous fuel emissions. There were plans for heavy on-road vehicles to pay from 1 July 2014.

In effect, the scope of the scheme meant that only a small number of large electricity generators and larger industrial plants were subject to the carbon price scheme. The tax was payable by surrendering carbon units, which had been either purchased (at $20 per tonne in 2012–13) or acquired free under an industry assistance program. The pricing mechanism was expected to cover 60% of Australia's carbon emissions. 75% of each company's annual obligation were to be paid by 15 June each year with the remaining 25% by the following 1 February.

A list of companies which had paid the carbon tax, and the amount which each had paid, was published by the Clean Energy Regulator (CER). This was called the Liable Entities Public Information Database or LEPID. The LEPID for 2012–13 was updated on 12 July 2013 and the companies which were the fifteen largest payers of carbon tax in 2012–13 are shown in the summary below (related companies are grouped together where identifiable).

Australian's Top 15 Payers of Carbon Tax in 2012–13 (account for 70% of total carbon units lodged)
Company	Activity	Carbon units lodged in 2012–13 (million)
GDF Suez	Electricity generation	25.8
AGL	Electricity generation	19.1
Macquarie Generation	Electricity generation	16.0
Delta Electricity	Electricity generation	13.3
Energy Australia	Electricity generation	11.9
Origin Energy	Electricity generation	11.6
Stanwell Corporation	Electricity generation	11.0
CS Energy	Electricity generation	7.4
Woodside Energy	LNG production	6.6
Verve Energy	Electricity generation	5.5
NRG Gladstone	Electricity generation	4.8
BlueScope Steel	Iron & steelmaking	4.7
Alcoa	Alumina refining	4.6
Alinta Energy	Electricity generation	4.6
Millmerran	Electricity generation	4.4
Source – LEPID 12 July 2013

The Climate Change Authority, a statutory agency, was created to advise the government on the setting of carbon pollution caps, to conduct periodic reviews of the carbon pricing process, and to report on progress towards meeting national targets. These pollution caps were to form the basis for the cap-and-trade structure to commence in 2015.

== Industry assistance programs ==
The Government ran several major 'Industry Assistance' programs to reduce the impact of carbon tax for the 185 affected companies. These have the effect of significantly reducing the actual carbon tax raised.

=== Jobs and Competitiveness Program ===
The 'Jobs and Competitiveness Program' was for the non-electricity sector and was targeted at the 'emissions-intensive trade-exposed' activities – that is, companies which emitted a lot of CO_{2} and were exposed to imports or who trade internationally. There was a list of 48 trade-exposed activities, including business such as steel making, alumina refining, cement making and similar activities.

Depending on whether a company was 'highly' or 'moderately' emissions intensive, it received 94.5% or 66% of 'average industry carbon costs' supplied as free carbon units.

Overall in 2012–13 under the 'Jobs and Competitiveness Program', there were 104 million free carbon units issued to 123 applicants, valued at approximately $2.4 billion. The fifteen largest recipients of free carbon units in 2012–13, with related companies grouped together where identifiable, were:

Top 15 Recipients of Free Carbon Units in 2012–13 (under Jobs & Competitiveness Program)
Company	Activity	Free carbon units in 2012–13 (million)
Rio Tinto	Alumina, aluminium	19.6
Alcoa	Alumina, aluminium	12.5
Tomago Aluminium	Alumina, aluminium	8.8
BlueScope Steel	Iron & steelmaking	7.5
Woodside Energy	LNG production	5.5
BHP Billiton	Nickel, copper, alumina	5.1
Adelaide Brighton	Cement & lime	2.9
OneSteel	Iron & steelmaking	2.9
Cement Australia	Cement & lime	2.6
Orica	Ammonium nitrate	2.6
BP	Petroleum refining	2.2
Caltex	Petroleum refining	2.2
Alcan	Alumina refining	2.0
Boral	Cement	1.9
Wesfarmers	Industrial Gases	1.6
Source – Clean Energy Regulator

To put this into context, the LEPID list indicated that the total amount of carbon units to be surrendered would be 283 million units for 2012–13. 37% of these were awarded for free under the Jobs and Competitiveness Program.

=== Coal Fired Generation Assistance ===
Under the 'Coal Fired Generation Assistance' for coal-based electricity generating companies the Government gave out 42 million of free carbon units each year, valued at almost $5 billion. These were only issued to the generators with the highest amount of CO_{2} emission intensity, above 1.0 tonne of CO_{2} per MWh of energy. These were primarily the brown coal-fired generators in Victoria's Latrobe Valley

The free units were shared according to their size and the amount of CO_{2} produced compared to a more efficient black coal-fired power station. The list of companies which received the free units was published by the Clean Energy Regulator. Nine power stations qualified – the big four brown coal plants in Victoria, and five other much smaller plants. The four big brown coal plants in Victoria received the majority share of free carbon units, around 37 million of the 42 million free carbon units in September each year.

With an average emissions intensity of 1.3, that effectively meant there was no carbon tax on the first 20 TWh (or approximately 50%) they collectively produced each year.

=== Steel Transformation Plan package ===
The Steel Transformation Plan was a A$500 million package for Australia's two steelmakers. In 2012, payments of A$160 million were made, A$200 M to BlueScope and A$70 M to OneSteel.

== Effect of the carbon price ==
=== Reduction in emissions of greenhouse gases ===
Because the Australian carbon tax did not apply to all fossil fuels usage, it only had an effect on some of the emitters of greenhouse gases. Among those emitters to which it applied, emissions were significantly lower after introduction of the tax. According to the Investor Group on Climate Change, emissions from companies subject to the tax went down 7% with the introduction of the tax, and the tax was "the major contributor" to this reduction.

=== Continuing growth in greenhouse emissions ===
Australia's total greenhouse gas emissions increased by 0.3% in the first six months of the Carbon Tax to December 2012 to 276.5 Mt CO_{2} equiv, while Australia's gross domestic product grew at a rate of 2.5% per year.

Greenhouse emissions from stationary energy (excluding electricity) and transport grew by 4% in the first six months of the carbon tax to December 2012.

However, there is a five-year trend for emissions from the electricity generation sector in Australia to decline. Electricity emissions peaked at 38% of the national total in September quarter 2008, coinciding with the start of the 2008 financial crisis. In December 2012, electricity emissions were just 33% of national emissions. The decline is due partly to an almost 6% reduction in electricity demand in the National Electricity market since 2008. This fall in electricity demand followed:·

- Retail electricity prices rising by approximately 80% over the past five years; ·
- Reduced economic activity and closure of the Kurri Kurri aluminium smelter in mid-2012; and·
- A burst in residential solar PV generation following generous State Government incentives, now all curtailed.

Other factors contributing to the five-year fall in greenhouse emissions from the electricity sector are:·

- An increase in wind generation supported by the Renewable Energy Target subsidies; and·
- Fuel switching from coal to gas.

The Australian Government said in July 2013 that the carbon tax was a factor in reducing the emissions intensity in the National Electricity Market from 0.92 t of CO_{2} per MWh to 0.87 in the 11 months following its introduction.

Since the carbon tax was introduced, wholesale electricity prices in the National Electricity market increased significantly. The Energy Users Association of Australia in its June 2013 paper said that electricity generators have been able to pass through more than 100% of the cost of the carbon tax. "If the outcomes observed in the spot market persist then it can be unequivocally concluded that both fossil fuel generators and renewable generators will have gained as a result of emission pricing, at users' expense. Surely this is not what was intended."

=== Alternative explanations of emissions reductions ===
Frontier Economics said the reduction in emissions from the electricity sector in the first year of the carbon tax was 'largely explained by factors unrelated to the carbon tax'.

The Energy Users Association of Australia (EUAA) said in June 2013 "we suggest that it cannot be said that pricing emissions has reduced emissions in stationary energy to any meaningful extent"

=== Significant announcements which have, or may have, relevance to the carbon tax ===
AGL – In relation to its purchase of the Loy Yang brown coal-fired power station in 2012, one of the single largest emitters of CO_{2} in Australia states “On the supply side of the business, the most significant strategic development was the decision to buy the Loy Yang A power station. ... The Board also recognised that coal fired generation would be required for decades to come if the demand from Australian households and businesses for electricity was to continue to be satisfied"

Adelaide Brighton (Australia’s second largest cement producer) “ – AdelaideBrighton expects it will significantly mitigate the impact of the carbon tax over the next five years by:·

- Enhancing its import flexibility;·
- Reducing reliance on domestic manufacture; ·
- Increasing the use of alternative fuels and cementitious substitutes"

BlueScope (Australia's largest steelmaker) – "When funds from the Steel Transformation Plan are taken into account, the Company does not expect to face a net carbon liability over the period”.

=== Investments as a result of carbon tax ===
David Kassulke, the manager of AJ Bush & Sons, expressed grave concerns over the carbon tax during the lead up to its implementation. However, he later stated the carbon tax has had a positive impact on the business. The company expects to cut carbon emissions from 85,000 to 30,000 tonnes per year with the construction of a new biogas plant in 2013.

"The end result of the introduction of the new biogas technology will not only be a saving of millions of dollars in energy and carbon costs, but also an opportunity for the company to be positioned at the cutting edge of renewable energy technology in the rendering industry, Mr Kassulke said." "It means companies are now looking at ways to use less energy which equates to less cost and a subsequent reduction in the tax that is being levied."That has been the intention of the tax and clearly from that perspective it is working and working well".

== Political and industry response ==
The introduction of a carbon price in Australia was controversial. The day before the 2010 federal election, Prime Minister, Julia Gillard sent out a message regarding carbon pricing, stating "I don't rule out the possibility of legislating a Carbon Pollution Reduction Scheme, a market-based mechanism." However the article also articulated her position on that term of government. "While any carbon price would not be triggered until after the 2013 election... She would legislate the carbon price next term if sufficient consensus existed", and the federal opposition accused the government of breaking an election promise to not introduce a carbon tax. Julia Gillard responded to these accusations by saying that circumstances changed following the 2010 election. Then opposition leader Tony Abbott criticised the carbon pricing policy on economic grounds referring to it as "toxic" and likening it to an octopus embracing the whole of the economy. He pledged to repeal the tax after the 18 clean energy bills passed through the House of Representatives and stated that the next election would be a referendum on the "carbon tax".

The opposition (and since the 2013 election the Abbott government) proposed an alternative "direct-action" carbon emissions reduction scheme. Modelling produced by the Department of the Treasury indicated that this scheme would cost twice as much as the Clean Energy Futures Plan. Abbott was unable to find an Australian economist who supported his policy, although he did cite international economists who are supportive. Tony Abbott's "Direct Action Plan" has been criticised because there is no disincentive to continue polluting at the same rate, meaning that emissions will increase rather than decrease by 2020. In addition, "under Direct Action it is the public, not polluters who pay."

The Australian Renewable Energy Agency (ARENA) was established as part of the Clean Energy Fund, and commenced operations on 1 July 2012. It consolidated existing renewable energy technology innovation programs. It had funds to provide financial assistance to research, develop, demonstrate, deploy and commercialise renewable energy in Australia and related technologies. The government-established but independent Clean Energy Finance Corporation (CEFC) commenced investment operations from 1 July 2013, with a focus on investments in renewable energy, low-emissions and energy efficiency technology and the manufacturing companies that produce materials used in such technologies.

The majority of big emitters in Australia supported a price on carbon as at July 2012. However business groups and some big emitters, especially in the mining sector, were opposed to the pricing scheme.

Research by Preston Teeter and Jorgen Sandberg at the University of Queensland revealed that liable organisations responded with very few investments in emissions reduction activities, largely due to the great deal of policy uncertainty surrounding the scheme.

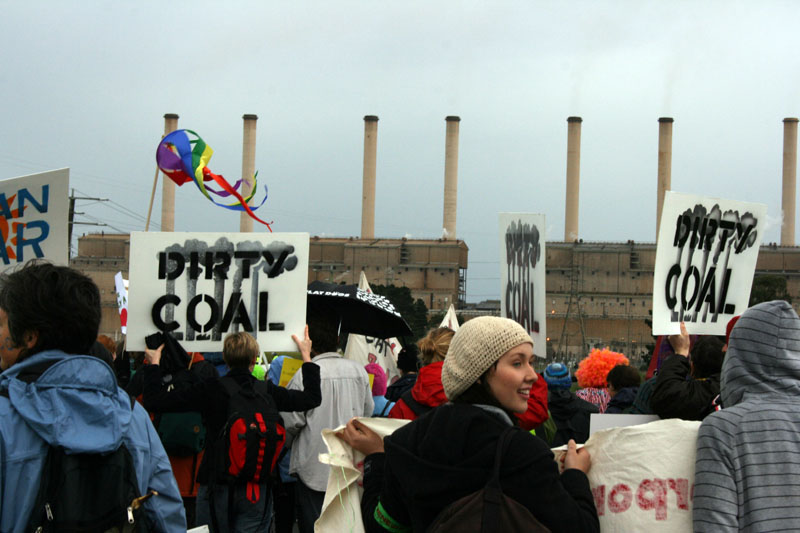
A protest at Hazelwood Power Station, the OECD's most polluting power station, in September 2009

One criticism of the carbon pricing scheme has been that Australia should not proceed with its introduction ahead of other countries. However, according to the Department of Climate Change and Energy Efficiency, Australia will be one of around 50 jurisdictions implementing similar schemes worldwide. The starting price of $23 per tonne has also been a point of contention.

Emissions figures from the 2010–11 financial year suggest the electricity generation sector may be due to pay around A$3.9 billion. Loans have been made available so that electricity generators can purchase carbon permits. Macquarie Generation, a Government of New South Wales owned electricity generator, wrote down the value of its assets by about A$1 billion as a result of the carbon tax. Power generators in the Latrobe Valley also face substantial write-downs.

Modelling undertaken by the Virgin Australia airline calculated that the average increase per flight would be A$3. They responded by implementing a surcharge of between $1.00 and 5.00 to a one-way flight starting in July 2012. Qantas is raising its ticket prices by between $1.50 and 5.50.

In a survey conducted by the Economic Society of Australia, 60% of economists thought the carbon pricing proposal was sound economic policy, while 25% disagreed. A number of public protests both in support of and against the carbon price (or tax) were held in the run up to its introduction. These include the No Carbon Tax Climate Sceptics rallies and Say Yes demonstrations.

== Effects and impacts ==
The carbon pricing scheme was intended to improve energy efficiency, convert electricity generation from coal to alternatives and shift economic activity towards a low carbon economy. Its impact on business was forecast to be 0.1 – 0.2% lower than the business as usual scenario. The scheme aimed to prevent 160 million tonnes of carbon dioxide from entering the atmosphere by 2020, as well as generating $24 billion over three years.

In May 2012, the Australian Competition & Consumer Commission (ACCC) reported it was investigating about 100 cases where customers had possibly been misled into paying excessive price rises falsely claimed to be as a result of the carbon tax. By the middle of June, the commission was investigating about 200 cases. The consumer watchdog also set up a phone hotline and online form for complaints regarding excess pricing claimed to be due to the carbon tax. The ACCC had forecast that home construction costs would be at the lower end of the 0.7% to 1.8% range predicted by building companies. The Housing Industry Association estimated an average new house would experience a price increase of between 0.8% and 1.7% due to the carbon price. Housing construction was expected to be significantly impacted by the carbon tax because new homes require cement, bricks, aluminium, and glass, which are all typically energy-intensive materials. A forecast by the Centre for International Economics predicted the housing construction industry could decline by 12.6% as a result of the carbon price.

The coal industry was expected to be impacted due to the emissions produced as coal is mined, however a similar expense is not expected to be incurred by Australia's coal exporting competitors. The Institute of Public Affairs claimed that the Australian coal industry would lose jobs to overseas competitors and mines will be closed. Despite the announcement of the scheme, spending on mineral exploration in the March quarter was the highest ever at $1.086 billion. The impact on the LNG industry in Australia was expected to be minor to moderate. No major projects were expected to be cancelled as a result of the introduction of the carbon pricing scheme. Dairy farmers will be impacted because of higher power costs for milk processing.

Household bills were expected to rise by an average of around $5 per week. Energy retailer Synergy said the carbon price would result in a 7.1% rise to power bills.

=== Compensation ===
Because carbon pricing would indirectly flow through to consumers, the Australian government implemented household assistance measures.

The measures included changes to income tax: the tax-free threshold increased from A$6000 to 18200 on 1 July 2012, and was scheduled to rise to A$19,400 from 1 July 2015. The changes meant those earning less than A$20,000 received a tax cut with those earning up to A$5,000 receiving the greatest tax reduction. The changes were described as the biggest overhaul of taxation since the Goods and Services Tax was introduced in 2000.

Other steps included direct payments into bank accounts beginning in May 2012. The payments, called the Clean Energy Advance, were targeted at low- and middle-income households.

Some industries received direct compensation. As part of the Energy Security Fund, A$1 billion was promised to highly emissions-intensive coal-fired generators. Most of that funding was intended for coal-fired power generators in Victoria. Research by the Grattan Institute suggested that no black coal mining or liquefied natural gas projects would be scrapped as a result of carbon pricing, regardless of industry compensation; it further claimed that, if coupled with compensation, the carbon pricing regime would in fact leave the steel industry better off.

Under the Carbon Farming Initiative, farmers and graziers would have been able to plant trees to earn carbon credits, which could have been on-sold to companies liable to pay a carbon price. The Clean Technology Investment Program was touted as helping the manufacturing sector to support investments in "energy-efficient capital equipment and low emission technologies, processes and products". Companies in the food sector would also have been able to apply for grants to improve their energy efficiency.

=== Emissions reduction ===
Six months after the introduction of carbon pricing the Department of Climate Change and Renewable Energy reported a 9% decrease in emissions from electricity generators.

Nine months after the introduction of the pricing scheme, Australia's emissions of carbon dioxide due to electricity generation fell to a 10-year low, with coal generation down 6% from 2008 to 2009.

== Repeal ==
Heading into the 2013 Australian federal election, the Liberal Party platform included the removal of the 'Carbon Tax', claiming that the election was in effect a referendum on carbon pricing in Australia. The incoming Liberal government placed removing the carbon pricing scheme at the head of its legislative program.

The carbon tax repeal legislation received Royal Assent on 17 July 2014 and the bills which were part of the package became law, with effect from 1 July 2014.

== See also ==
- Climate change in Australia
- Energy development
- Economics of climate change mitigation
- List of climate change initiatives
- New South Wales Greenhouse Gas Abatement Scheme
