= Carbon Pollution Reduction Scheme =

Australian emissions trading scheme

Proposed Carbon Pollution Reduction Scheme
- Coat of arms of Australia
- Long title: A proposed act to introduce a Cap-and-Trade emissions trading scheme to Australia, aimed at being the main element of Australia's climate policy

The Carbon Pollution Reduction Scheme (or CPRS) was a proposed cap-and-trade emissions trading scheme for anthropogenic greenhouse gases authored by the Rudd government, as part of its climate change policy, which had been due to commence in Australia in 2010. It marked a major change in the energy policy of Australia. The policy began to be formulated in April 2007, when the federal Labor Party was in Opposition and the six Labor-controlled states commissioned an independent review on energy policy, the Garnaut Climate Change Review, which published a number of reports. After Labor won the 2007 federal election and formed government, it published a Green Paper on climate change for discussion and comment. The Federal Treasury then modelled some of the financial and economic impacts of the proposed CPRS scheme.

The Rudd government published a final White Paper on 15 December 2008, and announced that legislation was intended to take effect in July 2010; but the legislation for the CPRS (aka ETS) failed to gain the numbers in the Senate and was twice rejected creating a double dissolution election trigger. A bitter political debate within the Coalition Opposition saw Opposition leader Malcolm Turnbull lose the leadership to the anti-CPRS Tony Abbott. The Rudd government did not call an election and in April 2010, Rudd deferred plans for the CPRS.

After the 2010 federal election, the Gillard government was able to get the Carbon Pricing Mechanism passed into law as part of the Clean Energy Futures Package (CEF) in 2011, and became effective on 1 July 2012. However, after the 2013 federal election there was a change in government, and the Abbott government repealed the CEF package on 17 July 2014. Due to the great deal of policy uncertainty surrounding the scheme, organizations in Australia responded in a rather informal and tepid manner and largely withheld from making any large-scale investments in emissions reductions technology during the scheme's operation.

== History ==
In the 2007 election year, both the Liberal-led Coalition government and the Labor opposition promised to introduce carbon trading. Opposition leader Rudd commissioned the Garnaut Climate Change Review on 30 April 2007, while Prime Minister John Howard announced his own plan for a carbon trading scheme on 4 June 2007, after the final report of the Prime Ministerial Task Group on Emissions Trading. Labor won the election on 24 November 2007.

== Green Paper ==
The draft Garnaut Report, issued on 4 July 2008, was only one of many inputs into the policy-making process. The Labor government also issued a "Green Paper" on 16 July 2008 that described the intended design of the carbon trading scheme.

The Carbon Pollution Reduction Scheme, was a market-based approach to greenhouse gas pollution, to be implemented in 2010 (Department of Climate Change, 2008, 9). The main concern for the Australian government was getting the design of such a scheme correct, so that it would have complemented the integrated economic policy framework, and would have been consistent with the Government's commercial strategy (Department of Climate Change, 2008, 10).

The objective of the Carbon Pollution Reduction Scheme was to meet Australia's emissions reduction targets in the most flexible and cost-effective way; to support an effective global response to climate change; and to provide for transitional assistance for the most affected households and firms (Department of Climate Change, 2008, 14).

The basis of a Carbon Pollution Reduction Scheme was a cap and trade system, and was a way of limiting greenhouse gas pollution, as well as giving individuals and businesses incentives to reduce their emissions (Department of Climate Change, 2008, 11). The Australian Government would have set a cap on carbon emissions, consistent with longer-term goals of reducing Australia's emissions by 60% compared with 2000 levels by 2050 (Department of Climate Change, 2008, 11).

There were two definite elements of the cap and trade scheme: the cap itself, and the ability to trade (Department of Climate Change, 2008, 12). The cap is the limit on greenhouse gas emissions imposed by the Carbon Pollution Reduction Scheme. The system aims at achieving the environmental outcome of reducing greenhouse gas emissions, the idea being that capping emissions creates a price for carbon and the ability to trade ensures that emissions are reduced at the lowest possible price (Department of Climate Change, 2008, 12). Setting a limit means that the right to emit greenhouse gases becomes scarce, and scarcity entails a price. The Carbon Pollution Reduction Scheme would have put a price on carbon in a systematic way throughout the economy (Department of Climate Change, 2008, 13).

The 'covered' sectors are sources of emissions subject to the cap, which were specified in the Carbon Pollution Reduction Scheme (Department of Climate Change, 2008, 12). After setting the cap, the Government would have then issued permits that are equal to the cap. The Green Paper gives the example "if the cap were to limit emissions to 100 million tonnes of CO_{2}-e in a particular year, 100 million 'permits' would be issued that year" (2008, 12). For every tonne of emissions emitted, a source of emissions would have been required to acquire and surrender a permit (Department of Climate Change, 2008, 12). About one thousand firms were expected to have obligations from the Scheme.

The price of emissions would increase the cost of those goods and services that are most emissions-intensive (Department of Climate Change, 2008, 13). This means that there will be a change across the prices of goods and services across the economy, reflecting how emission-intensive the goods or service is. That therefore provides businesses and consumers with incentives to use and invest in low-emissions technologies.

The second essential element of a cap and trade scheme is the ability to trade. Since carbon pollution permits will be tradable, the price of permits will be determined by the market (Department of Climate Change, 2008, 13). The main idea behind this part of the scheme is that a firm who can undertake abatement more cheaply than the permit price will do so, and that a company will pay for permits if the cost to it of lowering its emissions exceeds the cost of the permits. By trading among themselves, firms achieve the scheme cap at the least cost to the economy (Department of Climate Change, 2008, 13).

The cap would only achieve the desired environmental objectives if it is enforced. This means that firms responsible for emissions covered by the Carbon Pollution Reduction Scheme must monitor their emissions and report them accurately to government (Department of Climate Change, 2008, 12). The reported emissions data would need to be monitored and verified.

== Treasury report on the economics of climate change mitigation ==
The Australian Treasury's report on the economics of climate change mitigation was released on 30 October 2008. The report was a key input in determining the structure and targets for the Carbon Pollution Reduction Scheme.

The Treasury's modeling demonstrated that early global action to reduce carbon emissions would be less expensive than later action and stated that a market-based approach allows robust economic growth into the future as emissions fall.

The report also stated that:

- many of Australia's industries would maintain or improve their competitiveness under an international agreement to combat climate change
- even ambitious goals would have limited impact on national and global economic growth
- Australia and the world can continue to prosper while making the emission cuts required to reduce the risks of dangerous climate change.
- Households would face increased prices for emission-intensive products such as electricity and gas, however real household income would continue to grow.
- Strong coordinated global action would reduce the economic cost of achieving environmental objectives, reduce distortions in trade-exposed sectors, and provide insurance against climate change uncertainty.
- There are advantages to Australia acting early if emission pricing expands gradually across the world: economies that defer action face higher long-term costs, as global investment is redirected to early movers.
- Australia's aggregate economic costs of mitigation are small, although the costs to sectors and regions vary. Growth in emission-intensive sectors slows and growth in low- and negative-emission sectors accelerates.
- Allocation of some free permits to emission-intensive trade-exposed sectors, as the Government proposes, eases their transition to a low-emission economy in the initial years.
- Broadly based market-oriented policies, such as emissions trading, allow the market to respond as new information becomes available.

== White Paper ==
The White Paper was released on 15 December 2008. The White Paper included the Rudd Labor government's targets for Greenhouse gas emission reductions, 5% below 2000 by 2020 on a unilateral basis or up to 15% below 2000 by 2020 if also agreed by the other major emitters. This compares to the 25 to 40% cut compared to 1990 emissions recommended by the IPCC as needing to be made by developed countries to keep CO_{2} below 450 ppm and to have a reasonable chance of keeping global warming at less than a 2-degree Celsius increase above pre-industrial times.

The White Paper also set an indicative national emissions trajectory for the first few years of the scheme:

- in 2010–11, 109% of 2000 levels;
- in 2011–12, 108% of 2000 levels;
- in 2012–13, 107% of 2000 levels.

For comparison, in 2006, Australia's emissions were 104% of 2000 levels (under Kyoto accounting).

Some of the features of the emissions trading scheme proposed were:

1. an output as opposed to consumption based scheme
2. A modelled carbon price range of AUD 20 to AUD 40 per tonne of carbon.
3. Less than 1,000 businesses will have to account for their emissions and buy or be allocated free permits.
4. AUD 4.8 billion of assistance (in the form of free permits) for the most polluting electricity generators.
5. Financial assistance to compensate low and middle income families from increased costs.
6. Free permits to emissions-intensive, trade-exposed businesses - such as aluminium producers, iron and steel makers, petrol refiners and LNG producers, initially totaling 25% to 33% of permits and rising to 45% by 2020.
7. There will be total offset of the impact on fuel prices on households for 3 years.
8. Agricultural emissions are not included initially but may be included from 2015.
9. There will be a price cap on emissions, that will start at AUD 40 per tonne of carbon dioxide equivalent.
10. Firms will be able to purchase unlimited quantities of emissions allocations (including CERs under the clean development mechanism) from the international market, but will not be able to sell them during the initial years.
11. Reforestation can count as carbon credit, but deforestation and forest degradation do not count as a liability.

=== Criticism ===
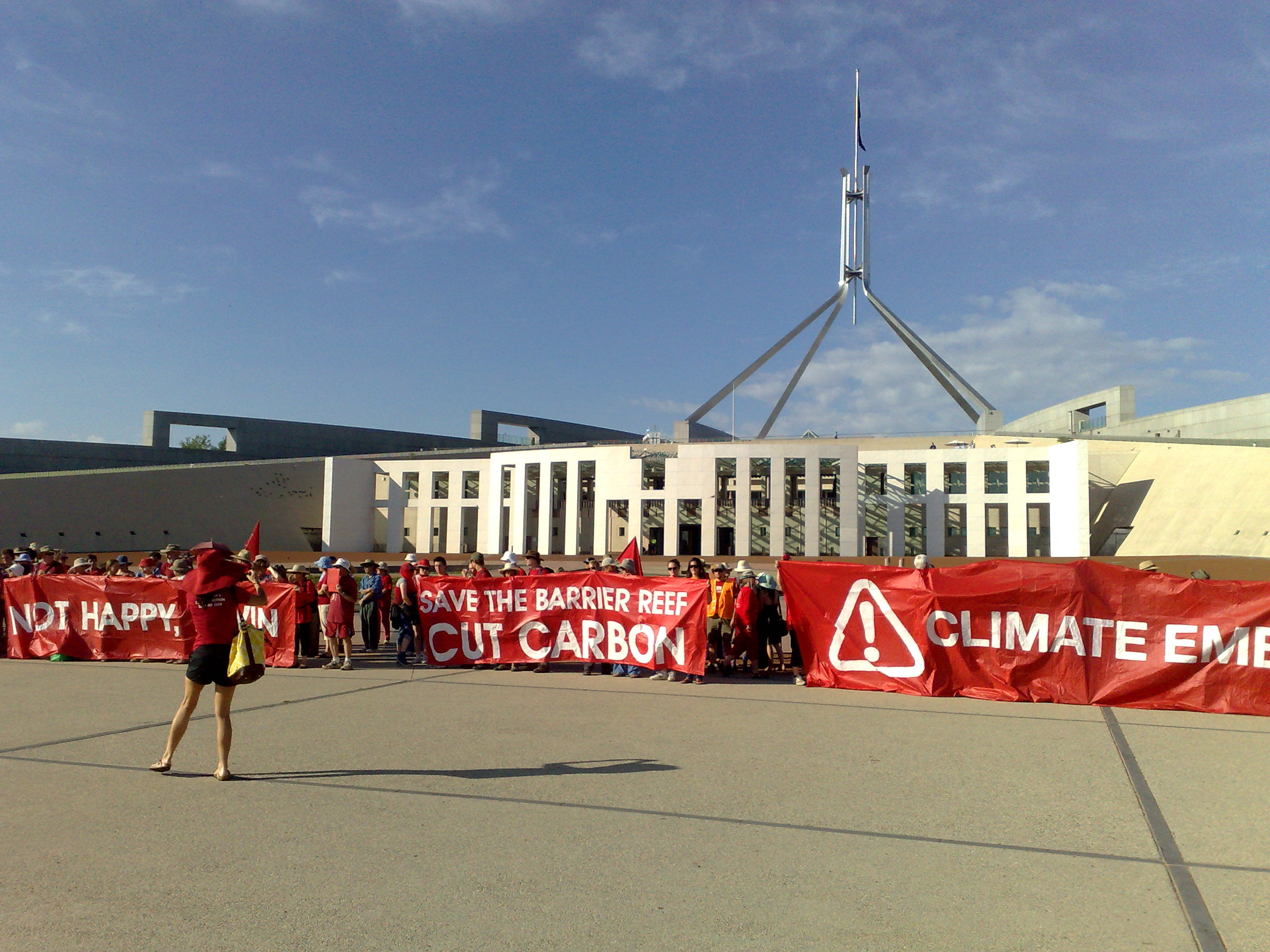
Climate Summit protest against CPRS and other climate change issues

The national Climate Action Summit of 500 participants representing 140 climate groups Australia wide has condemned the CPRS and agreed to campaign to prevent it becoming law. Major concerns included announced targets, granting of property rights to pollute and providing free permits to major polluters. Summit participants were joined by 2,000 other people in surrounding parliament house to express dissatisfaction with the Rudd government climate change policies.

==== Criticism of the targets ====
Several organisations criticised the choice of emission reduction targets in the CPRS. Greenpeace, the World Wildlife Fund, the Wilderness Society and the Climate Institute were joined by the Greens and other environmentalists in calling for more ambitious 2020 targets of 25 to 45 per cent reductions. Professor Andy Pitman described the targets as inadequate. Professor Barry Brook, the Director of the Research Institute for Climate Change and Sustainability at the University of Adelaide, stated that "the 14% cut in our total emissions by 2020 announced today is such a pitifully inadequate attempt to stop dangerous climate change that we may as well wave the white flag now." Dr Regina Betz, Joint Director of the Centre for Energy and Environmental Markets at UNSW, stated "The proposed 2020 targets of emission reductions of 5 to 15% are, according to the climate science, entirely inadequate for an equitable global response to avoid dangerous global warming." Dr Frank Jotzo, deputy director of the ANU Climate Change Institute, and former advisor to the Garnaut Climate Change Review, said "ruling out a 25% reduction is a mistake, since Australia's overwhelming interest is strong global climate action. An international agreement with deep cuts has just become a little bit more unlikely, as a result of Australia not putting a compatible offer on the table" and "the Treasury modelling has shown that even deep cuts won't carry big economic costs for Australia, if the policies are sound."

==== Industry criticism ====
Australian industrialists were concerned about cost impacts. Australian Chamber of Commerce & Industry chief executive Peter Anderson said his members were "apprehensive" about the scheme because it was "too risky" and warned the costs would be borne not only by emissions-intensive, trade-exposed industries but also by "small and medium businesses through higher energy costs and the flow-on from restructuring of larger industries". Australian Industry Group chief executive Heather Ridout said the scheme was "a big ask and will have a big impact on the Australian economy" and estimated it would add about $7 billion to business costs by 2010.

==== Other criticism ====
Other sources of criticism included concerns over coverage of agriculture, impacts on the minerals sector and implications for international agreements. Dr Hugh Saddler, Managing Director of Energy Strategies Pty Ltd, stated "the white paper does not include measures to reduce emissions from the major non-energy sectors such as agriculture and land clearing. While it is a good decision not to include these emission sources within the CPRS, it is essential that there be other strong programs specifically directed at these sectors." Mitch Hooke, the head of the Minerals Council of Australia, said his organisation was "profoundly disappointed that the white paper was not better aligned with progress towards a global agreement on reduction commitments, new low emissions technologies and emissions trading schemes in other countries" South Africa's environment minister, Marthinus Van Schalkwyk, described the scheme as an inadequate "opening bid", and warned that it is not "nearly good enough to bring developing countries to the table".

Professor Ross Garnaut, previously an adviser to the Government on climate change, 'damned' the Rudd government's carbon policy because of the gross over-compensation of coal-fired electricity generators; the possibility of taking 25% emission reduction targets off the table when they are in Australia's best interest; the lack of a principled basis for support of trade-exposed industries and the potential threat to public finances of the proposed compensation to industry.

=== Support ===
Statements of support included: The United Nations climate negotiator Yvo de Boer told ABC Radio "Australia's now put a figure on the table, something countries have been calling for a long time". Gerard Henderson, the former Chief-of-Staff to John Howard, has described Rudd's emissions targets as "responsible".

After changes announced in May 2009, some business and environment groups announced that the CPRS, although weak, was now worth supporting.

== May 2009 changes ==
On 4 May 2009, the government announced a number of modifications to the proposed Scheme, including a delayed start, a deeper conditional target (25% by 2020, in the event of a global agreement aiming at 450 ppm), more assistance for industry, and a "carbon trust" to enable voluntary action by households.

== November 2009 changes ==
There were a number of significant changes made to the scheme in November 2009 after Malcolm Turnbull negotiated with Prime Minister Kevin Rudd. These changes included large increases in compensation for polluting industries, including the coal and aluminium smelting industries. $4 billion was proposed for the manufacturing sector and $1.5 billion was proposed for electricity generators.

== Rejection and withdrawal of bill ==
Without a majority in the Senate, and without the support of the Opposition, Labor needed support from the undecided cross-bench members, the Greens, Family First and independent senators. On 30 November 2009, the Senate failed to pass the CPRS, giving Kevin Rudd a potential reason for calling a double dissolution election.

On 27 April 2010, Prime Minister Rudd announced that the Government had decided to delay the implementation of the CPRS until after the current commitment period of the Kyoto Protocol (which ended in 2012). The Government cited the lack of bipartisan support for the CPRS and slow international progress on climate action for the delay. The Prime Minister announced that the CPRS would be introduced only when there was greater clarity on the actions of other major economies including the US, China and India.

In June 2010, the Minister for the Environment, Heritage and the Arts, Peter Garrett, told Sky News that he first learned of the scrapping of the CPRS when he read about it in a newspaper after it was leaked by a Government source.

The delay in implementing the CPRS drew strong criticism of Rudd and the Labor Party from the Federal Opposition, and from community and grassroots action groups such as GetUp. On 5 April 2011, Rudd stated that he believed it had been a mistake to delay the ETS during his term as Prime Minister.

In February 2011, the Gillard government announced the Clean Energy Bill 2011, an emissions trading scheme to replace the CPRS. This Bill was passed into law later that year, paving the way for a carbon price which was introduced on 1 July 2012.

== See also ==
- Carbon pricing in Australia
- List of climate change initiatives
- Department of Climate Change and Energy Efficiency (Australia)
- Energy policy of Australia § Green paper on Carbon Pollution Reduction Scheme
- Asia-Pacific Emissions Trading Forum

== Bibliography ==
- "Carbon Pollution Reduction Scheme Green Paper" (PDF). Department of Climate Change. 16 July 2008.
- "Carbon Pollution Reduction Scheme: Australia's Low Pollution Future (The White Paper)". Department of Climate Change. 15 December 2008. Archived from the original on 27 July 2009.
