= Double counting =

Double counting may refer to:

- Double counting (proof technique), a method in combinatorics that proves two expressions to be equal by demonstrating that they are different ways of counting the same set
- Double counting (fallacy), a fallacy in combinatorics and probability theory whereby objects are counted more than once
- Double counting (accounting), an error in accounting whereby a transaction is counted more than once

== See also ==
- Population without double counting
