= Council for the Australian Federation =

Meetings with state and territory governments

The Council for the Australian Federation (CAF) is a group that seeks to promote and enhance the federal system of government in Australia and comprises Premiers and Chief Ministers of all Australian states and territories. The Council for the Australian Federation aims to strategically shape the national policy agenda and provide a forum for political actions. The Council funds research and releases reports on topics related to its mission and activities. Issues that have been addressed include the National Emissions Trading Taskforce, implementation of the National Reform Agenda and the drought in Australia. The current chair is South Australian Premier, Peter Malinauskas.

The Council was established on 6 October 2006. The idea for it was originally advocated by the then Victorian Premier Steve Bracks and then South Australian Premier Mike Rann. They had been impressed by a meeting of Canada's Council of the Federation chaired by Quebec's Premier Jean Charest which they attended, along with Queensland's Anna Bligh, in Montreal earlier in 2006. Rann became the inaugural Chair.

The second meeting of the CAF was held on 9 February 2007 in Sydney. In this meeting, it issued the CAF Declaration on Climate Change. The Council undertook substantial policy work and modelling on emissions trading.

The third meeting was conducted on 12 April 2007. CAF commissioned eminent Australian academic Professor Ross Garnaut to review the likely impact of climate change on the Australian economy and to make recommendations on medium and long term policies to deal with that impact.

A CAF meeting was held on 12 April 2024, which focused on disability, health reforms, housing pressures and negotiation of several national funding agreements.

== See also ==
- National Cabinet
- Council of Australian Governments
- Council of the Federation
