= Stern Review =

2006 report on the economics of climate change

Stern Review on the Economics of Climate Change
- Presented: 30 October 2006
- Commissioned by: Government of the United Kingdom
- Author: Nicholas Stern
- Media type: Report
- Subject: Effect of global warming on the world economy

The Stern Review on the Economics of Climate Change is a 700-page independent review released for the Government of the United Kingdom on 30 October 2006 by economist Nicholas Stern, chair of the Grantham Research Institute on Climate Change and the Environment at the London School of Economics (LSE) and also chair of the Centre for Climate Change Economics and Policy (CCCEP) at Leeds University and LSE. The report discusses the effect of global warming on the world economy. Although not the first economic report on climate change, it is significant as the largest and most widely known and discussed report of its kind.

The Review states that climate change is the greatest and widest-ranging market failure ever seen, presenting a unique challenge for economics. The Review provides prescriptions including environmental taxes to minimise the economic and social disruptions. The Stern Review's main conclusion is that the benefits of strong, early action on climate change far outweigh the costs of not acting. The Review points to the potential impacts of climate change on water resources, food production, health, and the environment. According to the Review, without action, the overall costs of climate change will be equivalent to losing at least 5% of global gross domestic product (GDP) each year, now and forever. Including a wider range of risks and impacts could increase this to 20% of GDP or more, also indefinitely. Stern believes that 5–6 degrees of temperature increase is "a real possibility".

The Review proposes that one per cent of global GDP per annum is required to be invested to avoid the worst effects of climate change. In June 2008, Stern increased the estimate for the annual cost of achieving stabilisation between 500 and 550 ppm CO_{2}e to 2% of GDP to account for faster than expected climate change.

There has been a mixed reaction to the Stern Review from economists. Several economists have been critical of the Review, for example, a paper by Byatt et al. (2006) describes the Review as "deeply flawed". Some economists (such as Brad DeLong and John Quiggin) have supported the Review. Others have criticised aspects of Review's analysis, but argued that some of its conclusions might still be justified based on other grounds, e.g., see papers by Martin Weitzman (2007) and Dieter Helm (2008).

== Summary of the Review's main conclusions ==
The executive summary states:

- The benefits of strong, early action on climate change outweigh the costs.
- The scientific evidence points to increasing risks of serious, irreversible impacts from climate change associated with business-as-usual (BAU) paths for emissions.
- Climate change threatens the basic elements of life for people around the world—access to water, food production, health, and use of land and the environment.
- The impacts of climate change are not evenly distributed—the poorest countries and people will suffer earliest and most. And if and when the damages appear it will be too late to reverse the process. Thus we are forced to look a long way ahead.
- Climate change may initially have small positive effects for a few developed countries, but it is likely to be very damaging for the much higher temperature increases expected by mid-to-late century under BAU scenarios.
- Integrated assessment modelling provides a tool for estimating the total impact on the economy; our estimates suggest that this is likely to be higher than previously suggested.
- Emissions have been, and continue to be, driven by economic growth; yet stabilisation of greenhouse gas concentration in the atmosphere is feasible and consistent with continued growth.
- "Central estimates of the annual costs of achieving stabilisation between 500 and 550ppm CO_{2}e are around 1% of global GDP, if we start to take strong action now. [...] It would already be very difficult and costly to aim to stabilise at 450ppm CO_{2}e. If we delay, the opportunity to stabilise at 500–550ppm CO_{2}e may slip away."
- The transition to a low-carbon economy will bring challenges for competitiveness but also opportunities for growth. Policies to support the development of a range of low-carbon and high-efficiency technologies are required urgently.
- Establishing a carbon price, through tax, trading or regulation, is an essential foundation for climate change policy. Creating a broadly similar carbon price signal around the world, and using carbon finance to accelerate action in developing countries, are urgent priorities for international co-operation.
- Adaptation policy is crucial for dealing with the unavoidable impacts of climate change, but it has been under-emphasised in many countries.
- An effective response to climate change will depend on creating the conditions for international collective action.
- There is still time to avoid the worst impacts of climate change if strong collective action starts now.

== Background ==
On 19 July 2005 the Chancellor of the Exchequer, Gordon Brown announced that he had asked Sir Nicholas Stern to lead a major review of the economics of climate change, to understand more comprehensively the nature of the economic challenges and how they can be met, in the UK and globally. The Stern Review was prepared by a team of economists at HM Treasury; independent academics were involved as consultants only. The scientific content of the Review was reviewed by experts from the Walker Institute.

The Stern review was not released for regular peer-review, since the UK Government doesn't undertake peer review on commissioned reviews. Papers were published and presentations held, that outlined the approach in the months preceding the release.

== Positive critical response ==
The Stern Review attracted positive attention from several sectors. Pia Hansen, a European Commission Spokeswoman, said doing nothing is not an option, "we must act now". Simon Retallack of the UK think tank IPPR said "This [Review] removes the last refuge of the 'do-nothing' approach on climate change, particularly in the US." Tom Delay of The Carbon Trust said "The Review offers a huge business opportunity." Richard Lambert, Director General of the Confederation of British Industry, said that a global system of carbon trading is "urgently needed". Charlie Kronick of Greenpeace said "Now the government must act and, among other things, invest in efficient decentralised power stations and tackle the growth of aviation."

Asset managers F&C look to the business opportunities and say "this is an unprecedented opportunity to generate real value for our clients". Brendan Barber, General Secretary of the Trades Union Congress, was optimistic about the opportunities for industry to meet demands created by investment in technology to combat climate change. The Prince of Wales' Corporate Leaders Group on Climate Change, formed by 14 of UK's leading companies, shared this hope. Chairman of Shell UK, James Smith, expressed the hope of the group that business and Government would discuss how Britain could obtain "first mover advantage" in what he described as "massive new global market".

On 1 November 2006, Australian Prime Minister John Howard responded by announcing that A$60 million would be allotted to projects to help cut greenhouse gas emissions while reiterating that Australia would not ratify the Kyoto Protocol. Much of this funding was directed at the non-renewable coal industry.

British Prime Minister, Tony Blair, stated that the Review demonstrated that scientific evidence of global warming was "overwhelming" and its consequences "disastrous" if the world failed to act. The UK Treasury, which commissioned the report, simultaneously published a document of favourable comments on the Review. Those quoted include:

- Paul Wolfowitz, former President of the World Bank
- Claude Mandil, executive director of the International Energy Agency
- Kirit Parikh, Member, Planning Commission, Government of India
- Adair Turner, Former Director of UK Confederation of British Industry and Economic Advisor to Sustainable Development Commission
- Sir Rod Eddington, Adviser to the UK Government on the long term links between transport and economic growth, and former chief executive of British Airways

Several academic economists are also quoted praising the Review (see Response of economists).

The environmental campaign group Friends of the Earth argued in 2018 that the UK should imitate and extend the Review's principles with a "Stern-for-Resources" assessment, addressing shortages and supply pressures on natural resources:

"As one of the world’s most import-dependent economies, the UK must now conduct a 'Stern-for-Resources', going beyond specific high risk materials by giving a headline account of consumption, including how much land, water, materials and carbon are used. Doing so would enable policy-makers to develop an effective and evidence-based national resource strategy for resource sufficiency and the protection of the global environment.

== Negative critical response ==
The Stern Review has received various critical responses. Some economists have argued that the Review overestimates the present value of the costs of climate change, and underestimates the costs of emission reduction. Other critics have argued that the economic cost of the proposals put forward by Stern would be severe, or that the scientific consensus view on global warming, on which Stern relied, is incorrect. By contrast, some argue that the Review emission reduction targets are too weak, and that the climate change damage estimates in the Review are too small.

=== General criticisms ===
In an article in the Daily Telegraph (2006), Ruth Lea, Director of the Centre for Policy Studies, questions the scientific consensus on climate change on which the Stern Review is based. She says that "authorities on climate science say that the climate system is far too complex for modest reductions in one of the thousands of factors involved in climate change (i.e., carbon emissions) to have a predictable effect in magnitude, or even direction." Lea questions the long-term economic projections made in the Review, commenting that economic forecasts for just two or three years ahead are usually wrong. Lea goes on to describe the problem of drawing conclusions from combining scientific and economic models as "monumentally complex", and doubts whether the international co-operation on climate change, as argued for in the Review, is really possible. In conclusion, Lea says that the real motive behind the Review is to justify increased tax on fuels.

Yohe and Tol (2007) described Lea's article as a climate sceptics "scattershot approach" aiming to confuse the public by questioning the causal role of CO_{2}, by emphasising the complexity of making economic predictions and by attributing a motive for Stern's conclusions.

Miles Templeman, Director-General of the Institute of Directors, said: "Without countries like the US, China or India, making decisive commitments, UK competitiveness will undoubtedly suffer if we act alone. This would be bad for business, bad for the economy and ultimately bad for our climate."

Prof. Bill McGuire of Benfield UCL Hazard Research Centre said that Stern may have greatly underestimated the effects of global warming. David Brown and Leo Peskett of the Overseas Development Institute, a UK think-tank on international development, argued that the key proposals in relation to how to use forests to tackle climate change may prove difficult to implement:

Radical ideas are needed not only at the level of understandings but also of forward strategies. The Stern Review is much stronger on the former than the latter, and leaves a lot of questions unanswered on implementation, particularly the downstream practicalities of bringing avoided deforestation into climate mitigation efforts.

Soon after publication of the Stern Review, former Chancellor of the Exchequer Nigel Lawson gave a lecture at the Centre for Policy Studies, briefly criticising the Review and warning of what he called "eco-fundamentalism". In 2008, Lawson gave evidence before the House of Commons Treasury Select committee, criticising the Review.

Environmental writer Bjørn Lomborg criticised the Stern Review in OpinionJournal:

Mr. Stern's core argument that the price of inaction would be extraordinary and the cost of action modest [...] falls apart when one actually reads the 700-page tome. Despite using many good references, the Stern Review on the Economics of Climate Change is selective and its conclusion flawed. Its fear-mongering arguments have been sensationalized, which is ultimately only likely to make the world worse off.

Reason magazine's science correspondent Ronald Bailey describes the "destructive character" of the Stern Review's policy proposals, saying that "Surely it is reasonable to argue that if one wants to help future generations deal with climate change, the best policies would be those that encouraged economic growth. This would endow future generations with the wealth and superior technologies that could be used to handle whatever comes at them including climate change. [...] So hurrying the process of switching from carbon-based fuels along by boosting energy costs means that humanity will have to delay buying other good things such as clean water, better sanitation, more and better food, and more education."

Commenting on the Review's suggested increases in environmental tax, the British Chambers of Commerce have pointed to the dangers to business of additional taxation.

Jerry Taylor of the Cato Institute, a United States libertarian think-tank, criticised Stern's conclusion, taking a calculation by himself:

Stern's investment advice makes sense only if you think that warming will hammer GDP by 10% a year. You don't gain much at all from emission cuts, however, if you think GDP will only drop by 5% a year if we do nothing. And if you think warming will only cost the global economy 2% of GDP every year, [...] then Stern's investment advice is [sheer] lunacy.

In the BBC radio programme The Investigation, a number of economists and scientists argued that Stern assumptions in the Review are far more pessimistic than those made by most experts in the field, and that the Review's conclusions are at odds with the mainstream view (Cox and Vadon, 2007).

In his paper on the Jevons' Paradox, which states that improvements in energy-efficiency of technologies can potentially increase greenhouse gas emission, Steve Sorrel concludes with "A prerequisite for all the above is a recognition that rebound effects matter and need to be taken seriously. Something is surely amiss when such in-depth and comprehensive studies as the Stern(2007) review overlook this topic altogether." This criticism was rejected by the authors. They noted that by recommending a comprehensive global carbon price (see Summary above) the Stern Review proposed the most powerful mechanism for staunching the rebound effect. A carbon price imposes a wedge between the supply price received by producers and demand price paid by consumers thereby prompting substitution away from carbon-intensive activities. This insures that the substitution effect offsets the income effect.

In contrast to those who argued that the Stern Review was too pessimistic or 'alarmist', others argued that it did not go far enough. John Bellamy Foster, Brett Clark and Richard York in The Ecological Rift (2010) give considerable attention to the Stern Review, noting that the targets of 550 ppm imply a global temperature increase of at least 3 °C "well beyond what climate science consider dangerous, and which would bring the earth's average global temperature to a height last seen in the middle Pliocene around 3 million years ago" (p. 154). They posit that the basis for such high targets is "economics, pure and simple" (p. 155), that is, stronger emissions cuts were seen by the Stern Review authors as "prohibitive, destabilizing capitalism itself" (p. 155). "All of this signals that any reduction in CO2 equivalent emissions beyond around 1 per cent per year would make it virtually impossible to maintain strong economic growth—the bottom line of the capitalism economy. Consequently, in order to keep the treadmill of accumulation going the world needs to risk environmental Armageddon" (p. 156).

=== Stern report misused climate change study ===
According to the Sunday Times article "Climate change study was 'misused'", the Stern report 'misused' disaster analysts research by Robert Muir-Wood, head of research at Risk Management Solutions, a US-based consultancy. The Stern report, citing Muir-Wood, said: "New analysis based on insurance industry data has shown that weather-related catastrophe losses have increased by 2% each year since the 1970s over and above changes in wealth, inflation and population growth/movement. [...] If this trend continued or intensified with rising global temperatures, losses from extreme weather could reach 0.5%–1% of world GDP by the middle of the century." According to Muir-Wood, his research showed no such thing: he accused Stern of "going far beyond what was an acceptable extrapolation of the evidence".

== Response of economists ==
=== Discounting ===
One of the issues debated among economists was the discount rate used in the Review. Discounting is used by economists to compare economic impacts occurring at different times. Discounting was used by Stern in his calculation of the possible economic damages of future climate change. Marginal climate change damages were calculated for a "business-as-usual" greenhouse gas (GHG) emissions pathway. Residual climate change damages (at the margin) were also calculated for other emissions pathways, especially one peaking at 450 ppm CO_{2}e GHG concentration.

There are four main reasons commonly proposed by economists for placing a lower value on consumption occurring in the future rather than in the present:

- future consumption should be discounted simply because it takes place in the future and people generally prefer the present to the future (inherent discounting)
- consumption levels will be higher in the future, so the marginal utility of additional consumption will be lower
- future consumption levels are uncertain
- improved technology of the future will make it easier to address global warming concerns

Using a high discount rate decreases the assessed benefit of actions designed to reduce greenhouse gas emissions. The Stern Review did not use a single discount rate, but applied a stochastic approach whereby the discount rate varied with the expected outcomes, reflecting the interaction between growth and the elasticity of marginal utility, in line with Frank Ramsey's growth model. The Stern Review's average discount rate for climate change damages is approximately 1.4%, which, at the time of the Review, was lower than that used in most previous economic studies on climate change. Accounting for risk in the stochastic framework, however, means the expected mean or certainty equivalent discount rate will be below the discount rate for the mean expected outcome (Dietz, 2008, p. 11). In other words, accounting for risk means a greater weight is applied to worst case outcomes, as per the insurance market.

==== Inherent discounting ====
Debate over the Stern Review initially focused on the first of these points. In the Review, Stern used a social discount rate based on the "Ramsey" formula, which includes a term for inherent discounting, also called the pure rate of time preference (PTP-rate):

s = γ + η g

where s is the social discount rate, γ the PTP-rate, η the marginal elasticity of utility, and g the rate of growth of per-capita consumption (Dietz, 2008, p. 10). Stern accepts the case for discounting, but argues that applying a PTP-rate of anything much more than zero to social policy choice is ethically inappropriate. His view is supported by a number of economists, including Geoffrey Heal, Thomas Sterner,William Cline, and Brad DeLong. Cline wrote a book on global warming, published in 1992, where he made similar ethical choices to Stern for discounting. DeLong, echoing Frank Ramsey and Tjalling Koopmans, wrote "My view—which I admit may well be wrong—of this knotty problem is that we are impatient in the sense of valuing the present and near-future much more than we value the distant future, but that we shouldn't do so." Hal Varian stated that the choice of discount rate was an inherently ethical judgement for which there was no definitive answer.

William Nordhaus, of Yale University, who has done several studies on the economics of global warming, criticised the Review for its use of a low discount rate:

The Review's unambiguous conclusions about the need for extreme immediate action will not survive the substitution of assumptions that are more consistent with today's marketplace real interest rates and savings rates. Hence, the central questions about global-warming policy—how much, how fast, and how costly—remain open. The Review informs but does not answer these fundamental questions.

The difference between Stern's estimates and those of Nordhaus can largely (though not entirely) be explained by the difference in the PTP-rate. Previous studies by Nordhaus and others have adopted PTP-rates of up to 3 per cent, implying that (other things being equal) an environmental cost or benefit occurring 25 years in the future is worth about half as much as the same benefit today. Richard Tol argues that in estimating discounting rates and the consequent social cost of carbon, the assumptions that must be made about the remote future are so uncertain that they are essentially arbitrary. Consequently, the assumptions made dominate the results and with a low discount rate the social cost of carbon is also arbitrary.

In an appearance before the House of Commons Treasury Select Committee (2008), Stern was asked about the discount rate used in the Review:

Stern: [...] We are in pretty good company here in that [the distinguished economists] Solow, Sen, Keynes, Ramsey and all kinds of people have adopted the approach to pure time discounting that we have adopted. It is not particularly unusual.

John Roemer, Humberto Llavador and Joaquim Silvestre have argued that an analysis of the problem must consider both the ethical and economic issues associated with discounting. They have made the claim that high rates of discounting as the ones proposed by Nordhaus are only consistent with the infinitely-lived-representative-agent approach to economic modelling. Intergenerational justice would require more realistic assumption: one particular view is what they call the "sustainabilitarian" approach, which seeks to maximise present consumption subject to the constraint that future generations enjoy a quality of life at least as good as that enjoyed by the current generation. They support the discount factors used in the Stern analysis, particularly the view that discounting should reflect only the probability that the world will end at a given future date, and not the "impatience" of an infinitely lived representative consumer.)

==== Treatment of uncertainty ====
Uncertainty about future consumption may be addressed either through adjustments to the discount rate or by replacing uncertain flows of consumption with certainty equivalent flows. Stern adopted the latter approach, but was criticised by Tol and Yohe (2006) for double counting, a claim rejected by the Stern Review team (Dietz et al., 2007, pp. 138–139). Whilst critical of Stern's discounting, Martin Weitzman has argued that standard discounting procedures are inherently incapable of dealing with extreme, low-probability events, such as the risk of catastrophic climate change.

==== Future consumption will be higher ====
With increasing average consumption in future, the marginal utility of consumption will decline. The elasticity of the marginal utility of consumption (part of the social discount rate) may be interpreted as a measure of aversion to inequality. Partha Dasgupta has criticised the Stern Review for parametric choices that, he argues, are inadequately sensitive to inequality. In subsequent debate, Stern has conceded the case for a higher elasticity, but noted that this would call for much more extensive redistribution of income within the current generation (Dietz et al. 2007. pp. 135–137).

==== Improved technology ====
As far as discounting is concerned, the effects of improved technology work through increased consumption and do not need to be treated separately. However, specification of an optimal response to climate change will depend on assumptions about improvements in technology and the extent to which such improvements will be induced by policies that increase the cost of emissions.

==== Market rates ====
Both supporters and opponents of Stern's discount rate have used comparisons with market rates of return on capital to justify their position. Robert Mendelsohn of Yale University is a critic of the Review and has said:

[...] investments in mitigation that cannot even earn a positive rate of return will be worth far less to future generations than those same dollars invested in the market. Placing climate change before investments in other important nonmarket services such as conservation, health, education, security, and transportation also cannot be justified in the name of future generations. From the perspective of future generations, it is in their interest that all investments earn the same rate of return. The ethical justification for intentionally overspending on selective projects with low rates of return is weak indeed.

Nordhaus has been very critical of the Ramsey zero pure time preference on the basis of utilitarian ethical stance. He takes a strictly market based view of intergenerational projects arguing that the social rate of time preference reflects the rate of return observed in the marketplace. Nordhaus also raised his view that the present generation will have to forgo a large amount of consumption now for the benefit of future generations who will be much richer than the present generation.

Dasgupta argues that there is some confusion in the Stern review about the underlying rationale for the selection of the Ramsey parameters. He states that the review mixes both market returns on investment with parameters selected on ethical grounds.

The discount rate chosen by Stern is close to the real interest rate for government bonds. The higher rates preferred by Stern's critics are closer to the weighted average cost of capital for private investment; see the extensive review by Frederick et al. (2002) According to Quiggin, the difference between the two is determined by the equity premium. Quiggin says that there is no generally accepted theory accounting for the observed magnitude of the equity premium and hence no easy way of determining which approach, if either, should be regarded as the appropriate market comparator.

=== General comments ===
HM Treasury have issued a document where several economists are quoted praising the Stern Review, including Robert Solow, James Mirrlees, Amartya Sen, Joseph Stiglitz, and Jeffrey Sachs. Sachs and Stiglitz have also written favourable articles on the Review.

Richard Tol, an environmental economist at the Economic and Social Research Institute, is highly critical of the Stern Review, and has said that "If a student of mine were to hand in this report [the Stern Review] as a Masters thesis, perhaps if I were in a good mood I would give him a 'D' for diligence; but more likely I would give him an 'F' for fail (Cox and Vadon, 2007). There is a whole range of very basic economics mistakes that somebody who claims to be a Professor of Economics simply should not make. [...] Stern consistently picks the most pessimistic for every choice that one can make. He overestimates through cherry-picking, he double counts particularly the risks and he underestimates what development and adaptation will do to impacts." Tol has referred to the Stern Review as "populist science." In a paper published in 2008, Tol showed that the Stern Review's estimate of the social cost of carbon (SCC) along a "business-as-usual" emissions pathway was an outlier in the economics literature.

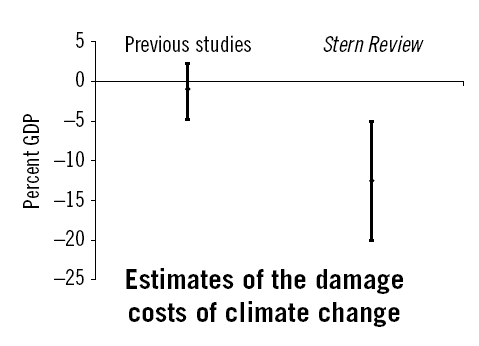
The Stern Review differed strongly from most other estimates of climate change costs in the economics literature in 2006.

Harvard economist Martin Weitzman has written a paper on the Stern Review (Weitzman, 2007). In this paper, Weitzman described himself as "skeptical" in regards to the discount rate used by Stern in the Review's formal (aggregated) assessment of climate change. One of Weitzman's conclusions was that Stern deserved credit for increasing public awareness on the dangers of climate change. However, Weitzman also commented that:

[...] in my opinion, Stern deserves a measure of discredit for giving readers an authoritative-looking impression that seemingly objective best-available-practice professional economic analysis robustly supports its conclusions, instead of more openly disclosing the full extent to which the Review's radical policy recommendations depend upon controversial extreme assumptions and unconventional discount rates that most mainstream economists would consider much too low.

Weitzman went on to call the Stern Review "right for the wrong reasons".

At a seminar held in 2006, Cambridge economist Partha Dasgupta commented on the Stern Review. Dasgupta (2006, p. 1) described the Review as "a long and impressive document", but felt that the authors had treated the issue of intergenerational equity (via the social discount rate) "cavalierly". Dasgupta (2006, pp. 6–7) accepted the Review's argument for a PTP-rate of 0.1%, but did not accept Stern's choice of 1 for the elasticity of marginal utility. He argued this point by calculating a saving rate of 97.5% based on the Review's values for the PTP-rate and elasticity of marginal utility. Dasgupta stated that "[a] 97.5% savings rate is so patently absurd that we must reject it out of hand." The calculation by Dasgupta was based on a model which had a deterministic economy, constant population, and no technological change.

Dasgupta's calculation was later cited by Berkeley economist Hal Varian. Writing in The New York Times newspaper, Varian commented "Sir Partha's stripped-down model leaves out uncertainty, technological change and population growth, but even so, such a high savings rate is totally implausible." Varian also questioned whether or not it was ethical for the current generation to transfer wealth to future generations (via investment in mitigation), who, given Stern's assumptions, would be much wealthier than we presently are.

Smith (2009) responded to Dasgupta's criticism of the Stern Review's implied savings rate. She showed that the rates of PTP and risk aversion in the Stern Review are consistent with saving rates of 25–32% rather than 97.5% when a macroeconomic model with the production function actually used by Stern and Nordhaus is used.

According to Dietz (2008, pp. 10–11), Varian's analysis had apparently confused the PTP-rate with the social discount rate. The PTP-rate, if positive, discounts the welfare of future generations even if they are poorer than the current generation. The social discount rate used by Stern, however, accounts for the possible increased wealth (consumption) of future generations through the product ηg (see the formula cited in the section on inherent discounting).

Terry Barker of the Tyndall Centre Climate Change Research wrote a paper (Barker, 2008) supportive of the Review. Barker was critical of how some economists have applied cost-benefit analysis to climate change:

The Stern Review considers cost-benefit analysis as a marginal analysis inappropriately applied to a non-marginal multi-disciplinary systemic problem (p. 50). Both Stern (p. 163) and the IPCC Reports after 1995 take a multi-criteria approach rather than a narrowly monetary one and question cost-benefit analysis. This is one reason for the intemperate response from some traditional economists to the Stern Review.

Eric Neumayer (2007) of the London School of Economics thought that the Review could have argued for emission reductions based on the non-substitutable loss of natural capital. Neumayer argued that the real issue is the non-substitutable loss of natural capital, that is to what extent climate change inflicts irreversible and non-substitutable damage to and loss of natural capital. Economists define natural capital as the multiple and various services of nature from which humans benefit- from natural resources to pollution absorption and environmental amenities.

Dieter Helm (2008) of Oxford University was critical of the Review's analysis but accepted its conclusion of the urgent need to reduce emissions. Helm justified this on the grounds that future damages to the environment would probably not be fully compensated for by increases in man-made capital. The draft report of the Garnaut Climate Change Review, a similar study conducted in Australia in 2008 by Ross Garnaut broadly endorsed the approach undertaken by Stern, but concluded, in the light of new information, that Stern had underestimated the severity of the problem and the extent of the cuts in emissions that were required to avoid dangerous climate change.

==== The Yale Symposium ====
In 2007, a symposium was held at Yale University on the Stern Review, with talks by several economists, including Nordhaus and Stern (Yale Symposium, 2007). Stern presented the basic conclusions of the Review, and commented on some of the criticisms of it made by other speakers. Chris Hope of Cambridge University explained how the damage estimates in the Review were calculated. Hope designed the PAGE2002 integrated assessment model that was used in the Review. Hope explained what would happen to the Stern Review's damage estimates if they were made using different assumptions, for example, a higher discount rate. Hope also pointed to the assumptions used in the model to do with adaptation.

In his talk, Nordhaus criticised the fact that the Stern Review had not been subject to a peer-review, and repeated earlier criticisms of the Review's discount rate. William Cline of the Peterson Institute supported the Review's general conclusions, but was uncomfortable about how most (greater than 90%) of the Review's monetised damages of climate change occur after 2200. Cline noted that the Review's large cost-benefit ratio for mitigation policy allows room for these long-term costs to be reduced substantially but still support aggressive action to reduce emissions.

Robert Mendelsohn was critical of the way the Stern justified his suggested mitigation policy in the Review. Mendelsohn said that rather than finding an optimal policy, the Review presented a choice of policy versus no-policy. Jeffrey Sachs of Columbia University questioned some of the assumptions used in Nordhaus's integrated assessment model (DICE) of climate change. Sachs was supportive of Stern's cost estimates of climate change mitigation.

In response to these talks, Stern accepted Cline's comment about the weighting of future damages, and said that the weighting of these damages could be reduced by the increasing the size of the elasticity of marginal utility in the social discount rate. With regards to criticisms of the discount rate, Stern accepted that differences of opinion could exist on his ethical choice for the PTP-rate (Yale Symposium, 2007, p. 118).

Other comments by Stern included what he viewed as confusion over what he had suggested as a possible level for a carbon tax. According to Stern, the tax will not necessarily be the same as the social cost of carbon due to distortions and uncertainties in the economy (p. 121). His suggested tax rate was in the range of 25 to 30 dollars per ton of carbon. Stern did not accept Mendelsohn's argument that the Review presented a choice of policy versus no policy. Stern commented that the arguments for his recommended stabilisation range were included in Chapter 13 of the Review (pp. 124–125).

==== The costs of mitigation ====
Economists have different views over the cost estimates of climate change mitigation given in the Review. Paul Ekins of King's College London (Treasury Committee, 2008) has said that Stern's central mitigation cost estimate is "reasonable", but economists Robert Mendelsohn and Dieter Helm have commented that the estimate is probably too low. According to Mendelsohn, the Stern Review is far too optimistic about mitigation costs, stating that "[one] of the depressing things about the greenhouse gas problem is that the cost of eliminating it is quite high. We will actually have to sacrifice a great deal to cut emissions dramatically" (Mendelsohn, 2007).

Professor Emeritus of Economics at Pepperdine University George Reisman has said that "Any serious consideration of the proposals made in the Stern Review for radically reducing carbon technology and the accompanying calls for immediacy in enacting them makes clear in a further way how utterly impractical the environmentalist program for controlling global warming actually is. The fundamental impracticality of the program, of course, lies in its utterly destructive character."

In a response to a paper by members of the Stern Review team, John Weyant of Stanford University commented on how the cost estimate of mitigation used in the Review was based on idealised models (Mendelsohn et al., 2008). Weyant wrote that his own high short-run cost projection for stabilisation, of possibly 10% GDP, resulted "primarily from institutional pessimism rather than technological pessimism."

==== Comparison with climate damages ====
Nobel prize winner Kenneth Arrow has commented on the Stern Review in the Economist's Voice (Arrow, 2007a) and for Project Syndicate (Arrow, 2007b):

Critics of the Stern Review don't think serious action to limit CO_{2} emissions is justified, because there remains substantial uncertainty about the extent of the costs of global climate change, and because these costs will be incurred far in the future. However, I believe that Stern's fundamental conclusion is justified: we are much better off reducing CO_{2} emissions substantially than risking the consequences of failing to act, even if, unlike Stern, one heavily discounts uncertainty and the future.

Arrow analysed the Stern Review's conclusions by looking at the Review's central estimate of GHG stabilisation costs of 1% GNP, and high-end climate damages of 20% GNP (Arrow, 2007a, pp. 4–5). As part of the Ramsay formula for the social discount rate, Arrow chose a value of 2 for the marginal elasticity of utility, while in the Review, Stern chose a value of 1. According to Arrow, Stern's recommended stabilisation target passes a cost-benefit test even when considerably higher PTP-rate (up to around 8%) than Stern's (0.1%) is used. Arrow acknowledged that his argument depended on Stern's stabilisation central cost estimate being correct.

Gary Yohe of Wesleyan University noted that Stern's estimates of business-as-usual climate damages were given in terms of per capita consumption equivalents, but Stern's costs of mitigation were given in terms of a percentage reduction in gross world product. Yohe stated that the two different measures are "not really at all comparable". Yohe commented on how the Review gives the impression that all climate damages can be avoided through the investment of 1% of world GDP in mitigation. This, however, would still lead to global warming (as per the Review's 550 ppm CO_{2}e mitigation target) of around 1.5 to 4.5 °C above pre-industrial temperatures. Significant portions of climate damages would therefore still persist with Stern's mitigation target. To measure the benefit of Stern's mitigation target, the residual climate damages from mitigation would need to be subtracted from Stern's business-as-usual climate damages.

=== Ecological Economic Critique ===
The main criticisms cited above concern the details of calculations and modelling choices within an orthodox economic framing of the world and mostly try to argue against substantive greenhouse gas mitigation. Ecological economists accept the need for serious action but reject the reasoning of economic commensuration of costs and benefits, the probabilistic approach to uncertainty and the application of a utilitarian intergenerational calculus. Their criticism applies equally to the likes of Nordhaus and Tol. The orthodox economic debate is seen as a distraction from the basic ethical issues e.g. discounting instead of justice.

A more fundamental criticism of the Stern report is that it raises a series of problems which it totally fails to address because of its orthodox approach. It simultaneously ignores a range of critical literature from ecological economics and environmental ethics which challenges such orthodox thinking. Stern as an orthodox economist squeezes all matters and concepts into a narrow mathematical formalism which heterodox economists, such as Tony Lawson, point out fails to address economic and social reality.

In conventional cost-benefit analysis, biodiversity and ecosystem services that are not valued as losses are difficult to quantify. Neumayer argues that the real issue is non-substitutable loss of natural capital; to what extent climate change inflicts irreversible and non-substitutable damage to and loss of natural capital. For example, it would be difficult to quantify the loss of coral reefs, biodiversity loss, or species extinction. Dietz points out that in many Integrated Assessment Models (IAMs), health and ecosystem impacts are not included because the monetary valuation of these impacts is "speculative and uncertain". Dasgupta (2008) also points out most models do not consider natural capital. Although recent studies on ecosystem services have made gains in monetising the value of ecosystems, more recent studies on ecosystem services suggest the Stern Review underestimates the need for mitigation action as it is difficult for models to quantify the collapse of ecosystem services under climate change.

Thus, ecological economist Clive Spash has questioned whether the report is nothing more than an exercise in rhetoric. Spash notes that a range of serious problems challenging economic analysis is raised or mentioned in the report including: strong uncertainty, incommensurability, plural values, non-utilitarian ethics, rights, distributional inequity, poverty, and treatment of future generations. How then can this report, acknowledging so many of those aspects of climate change that render orthodox economic analysis unsuitable for generating policy recommendations, go ahead to conduct a global cost-benefit calculation based on microeconomic theory and make that the foundation for its policy recommendations? Spash has argued that issues are suppressed and sidelined in a careful and methodical manner, with the pretense they have been addressed by 'state of the art' solutions. Meanwhile, the authors maintain allegiance to an economic orthodoxy which perpetuates the dominant political myth that traditional economic growth can be both sustained and answer all our problems. Besides perpetuating myths, this diverts attention away from alternative approaches, away from ethical debates over harming the innocent, the poor and future generations, and away from the fundamental changes needed to tackle the very real and serious problems current economic systems pose for environmental systems. In addition the policy recommendation of carbon trading is seen as deeply flawed for also failing to take account of social, ecological and economic reality.

== Response to criticisms ==
The Stern Review team have responded to criticisms of the Review in a number of papers. In these papers, they reassert their view that early and strong action on climate change is necessary:

The case for strong and urgent action set out in the Review is based, first, on the severe risks that the science now identifies (together with the additional uncertainties [...] that it points to but that are difficult to quantify) and, second, on the ethics of the responsibilities of existing generations in relation to succeeding generations. It is these two things that are crucial: risk and ethics. Different commentators may vary in their emphasis, but it is the two together that are crucial. Jettison either one and you will have a much reduced programme for action—and if you judge risks to be small and attach little significance to future generations you will not regard global warming as a problem. It is surprising that the earlier economic literature on climate change did not give risk and ethics the attention they so clearly deserve, and it is because we chose to make them central and explicit that we think we were right for the right reasons.

Members of the Stern Review team have also given several talks that have covered criticisms of the Review. A talk given by Dimitri Zenghelis at the Tyndall Centre looked at criticisms of the Review and presented an overview of its main findings. In an official letter (2008), Joan Ruddock MP of the UK Government, dismisses the criticisms of the Review made by several economists, which, in her view, show "a fundamental misunderstanding of the role of formal, highly aggregated economic modelling in evaluating a policy issue".

== Stern's later comments ==
In April 2008 Stern said that the severity of his findings were vindicated by the 2007 IPCC report and admitted that in the Stern Review, "We underestimated the risks [...] we underestimated the damage associated with temperature increases [...] and we underestimated the probabilities of temperature increases". In June 2008, Stern said that because climate change is happening faster than predicted, the cost to reduce carbon would be even higher, of about 2% of GDP instead of the 1% in the original report.

In an interview at the 2013 World Economic Forum, Stern said "Looking back, I underestimated the risks. The planet and the atmosphere seem to be absorbing less carbon than we expected, and emissions are rising pretty strongly. Some of the effects are coming through more quickly than we thought then" in the 2006 Review. He then believed we were "on track for something like four degrees".

== See also ==
- Climate change in the United Kingdom
- Avoiding Dangerous Climate Change
- Economics of global warming
- Garnaut Climate Change Review
- Global warming controversy
- Politics of global warming
- World Energy Outlook
- Prosperity Without Growth
