= Double counting (fallacy) =

Fallacy in reasoning

Double counting is a fallacy in reasoning. Double counting can be generalized as the fallacy in which, when counting events or occurrences in probability or in other areas, a solution counts events two or more times, resulting in an erroneous number of events or occurrences which is higher than the true result. This results in the calculated sum of probabilities for all possible outcomes to be higher than 100%, which is impossible.

An example of double counting is shown starting with the question: What is the probability of seeing at least one 5 when throwing a pair of dice? An erroneous argument goes as follows: The first die shows a 5 with probability 1/6, and the second die shows a 5 with probability 1/6; therefore, the probability of seeing a 5 on at least one of the dice is 1/6 + 1/6 = 1/3 = 12/36. However, the correct answer is 11/36, because the erroneous argument has double-counted the event where both dice show 5s.

In mathematical terms, the previous example calculated the probability of P(A or B) as P(A) + P(B). However, by the inclusion–exclusion principle, P(A or B) = P(A) + P(B) − P(A and B), one compensates for double counting by subtracting those objects which were double counted.

Another example is made in the joke where a man explains to his boss why he has to be an hour late to work every day:

- 8760 (365 × 24) hours compose one year.
- He needs 8 hours of sleep daily, (365 × 8) 2920 hours, leaving 5840 hours.
- He uses an hour and 30 minutes per meal, (1.5 × 365) 547.5 hours, leaving 5250.5.
- He needs 20 minutes a day to bathe, 109.5, leaving 5183.
- Weekends use 2 days a week, 52 weeks, 2496, leaving 2687.
- Vacation uses two weeks, 336 hours, leaving 2361.
- The company celebrates 5 holidays a year, 120, leaving 2231.
- He commutes to work 1 hour each way, 2 hours a day, 5 days a week, 50 weeks a year, 500, leaving 1731.
- The work week is 8 hours a day, 5 days a week, 50 weeks a year, 2000 hours, leaving him short by 269 hours, or roughly 1 hour of each work day.

All of the numbers are correct, but the man is counting them incorrectly. Sleeping, bathing and eating are also parts of the weekends, holidays and vacation times that are being included, making these hours double counted. Also, vacation time is calculated for 14 days rather than 10 working days, double counting two weekends.
