= Garnaut Climate Change Review =

Professor Ross Garnaut led two climate change reviews, the first commencing in 2007 and the second in 2010.

The first Garnaut Climate Change Review was a study by Professor Ross Garnaut, commissioned by then Opposition Leader, Kevin Rudd and by the Australian State and Territory Governments on 30 April 2007. After the election on 24 November 2007, Prime Minister of Australia Kevin Rudd confirmed the participation of the Commonwealth Government in the Review.

The Review examined the impacts of climate change on the Australian economy, and recommended medium to long-term policies and policy frameworks to improve the prospects for sustainable prosperity. Some observers have remarked that the Garnaut Review would be Australia's version of the Stern Review. A number of forums were held around Australia to engage the public on various issues relating to the Review. The Secretariat to support the Review was based in the Victorian Department of Premier and Cabinet. The final report of the Garnaut Review was delivered on 30 September 2008.

== Interim report - 21 February 2008 ==
The interim report of the Garnaut Review was released on 21 February 2008. The executive summary states:

"Adaptation to climate change, energy efficiency and the distribution of the costs of climate change across households and regions are not considered in any detail in the report, but will be addressed in the final report."

"Australia’s interest lies in the world adopting a strong and effective position on climate change mitigation. This interest is driven by two realities of Australia’s position relative to other developed countries: our exceptional sensitivity to climate change: and our exceptional opportunity to do well in a world of effective global mitigation. Australia playing its full part in international efforts on climate change can have a positive effect on global outcomes. The direct effects of Australia’s emissions reduction efforts are of secondary importance."

Interim greenhouse gas emissions reduction targets for 2020 to be set in 2008 are supported in addition to targets for 2050. An emissions trading scheme (ETS) is also supported, but there is little discussion as to why it is preferred over a carbon tax. There seems to be support for the continued public funding of research into carbon capture and storage in spite of the failure of the FutureGen project in the US to maintain public funding.

== Forestry and deforestation ==
The impact of deforestation is only considered for other countries, especially Indonesia and Papua New Guinea. The report does not consider forestry or deforestation in Australia. This contrasts the McKinsey Report on Greenhouse Gas Reduction which places forestry as the sector with the most significant greenhouse gas abatement potential in Australia for reductions by 2020.

== Draft report - 4 July 2008 ==
The draft report of the Garnaut Review was released on 4 July 2008.

The main conclusions of the report are

1. An ETS is preferred to a tax or hybrid scheme.
2. The ETS could have a transitional phase from 2010 to 2012
3. Permits could be sold at a "low, fixed" price during the transitional phase.
4. Spreading the costs across the economy will be achieved by including as many sectors as possible
5. Transport should be included in the emissions trading scheme ("ETS").
6. Emissions permits should be sold by competitive auction, and not given away or "grandfathered" to polluters.
7. Low income households will need compensation.
8. Half of the funds collected from the sale of permits can provide compensation for low income families.
9. Areas that rely on coal-based power stations will need specific support.
10. Australia should lead the way in making carbon capture storage (for example through biosequestration) commercially viable
11. A new research council should be set up.
12. $3 billion per year or 20% of the revenue raised from auctioning permits (whichever is greatest) should be allocated to low-emissions technology R&D
13. The Building Australia Fund should also be used for energy infrastructure.
14. Australia should help Asian countries reduce their levels of emissions.
15. Energy prices will rise under the scheme and will hit low income households hardest

== Projected impacts of climate change ==
The report indicated that in the absence of a global effort to reduce CO_{2} emissions, climate change would have severe adverse effects on Australian agriculture and on the natural environment. Irrigation in the Murray-Darling Basin would be severely affected, and in the most adverse scenarios, would cease altogether. Severe damage, and even destruction of the Great Barrier Reef is also a likely impact of rapid climate change.

== Final report ==
The Garnaut report was released on 30 September 2008. The report recommended that Australia push internationally for a carbon dioxide equivalent concentrations of 450 ppm, which would commit Australia to reductions of 25% on 2000 levels by 2020, and 90% by 2050. He also recommended that Australia have a fall-back position of 550 CO_{2} -e concentration, which would entail a 10% reduction in emissions by 2020, and an 80% reduction by 2050. He further recommended that, should all negotiations collapse at the Copenhagen summit, Australia should still reduce its emissions by 5% by 2020 on 2000 levels.

The report's key recommendation was to implement an emissions trading scheme. However, the report did not recommend free permits be granted to major polluters, or that transport sector be protected by special fossil fuel subsidies or tax excise cuts.

The report also recommended that up to $1 billion should be made available for matched funding for investment in reducing emissions in coal power generation, as a form of preemptive structural adjustment assistance.

Emission reductions from the agriculture and forestry sectors were excluded from the final report.

Professor Garnaut said that the overall cost to the Australian economy of tackling climate change under both the 450ppm and 550ppm scenarios was manageable and in the order of 0.1-0.2 per cent of annual economic growth to 2020.

The report estimated mitigation costs for 450ppm at almost a percentage point more than 550pmm mitigation of the present value of GNP through the 21st century. The report stated that stronger mitigation is justified by insurance value and non-market value benefits in the 21st century and much larger benefits beyond, and that the costs of action are less than the costs of inaction.

== Reaction ==
The report was criticised by the Australian Chamber of Commerce and Industry for the economic impact that reducing greenhouse gas emissions would have.

It was also heavily criticised by environmental organisations, including Friends of the Earth and Rising Tide. The Australian Conservation Foundation praised the report for advocating a 450 ppm target, but was critical of Professor Garnaut's 550ppm second best option and described the 2020 target of 10 per cent as weak.

Dr Clive Hamilton was heavily critical of the report, arguing that it reduced global expectations of what should be aimed for, naively exposed Australia's negotiating tactics to the international diplomatic sphere, alienated both the Australian public and the international community, misjudged the time frames necessary to avoid dangerous climate change, recommended giving Australia numerous special deals, and would be rejected by the international community.

Responses from political parties were mixed. Australian Greens leader Bob Brown suggested that the report demonstrated that reducing greenhouse gas emissions would not come at the expense of Australia's economic growth. Climate Change Minister Penny Wong did not comment directly on the report but said that economic responsibility needed to be considered in responding to the report, and that the Government would wait for Treasury modelling on climate change mitigation before responding.

Economist John Humphreys criticised the report, arguing that it massively overstated the projected costs of global warming (about three times the estimate of the Stern Report), and argued that therefore the costs of action in fact exceeded the costs of inaction. However, it must be recognised that the Stern Report related the cost of dealing with climate change in the United Kingdom to the GDP of the United Kingdom, whilst the Garnaut report compared these aspects in Australia and so such a comparison is not necessarily apt.

== See also ==
- Climate change in Australia
- Carbon pricing in Australia
- Effects of global warming on Australia
- Mitigation of global warming in Australia
- Climate Code Red: The Case for Emergency Action - a 2008 book
- IPCC Fourth Assessment Report
- Carbon sequestration
