= Emissions trading =

Market-based approach used to control pollution

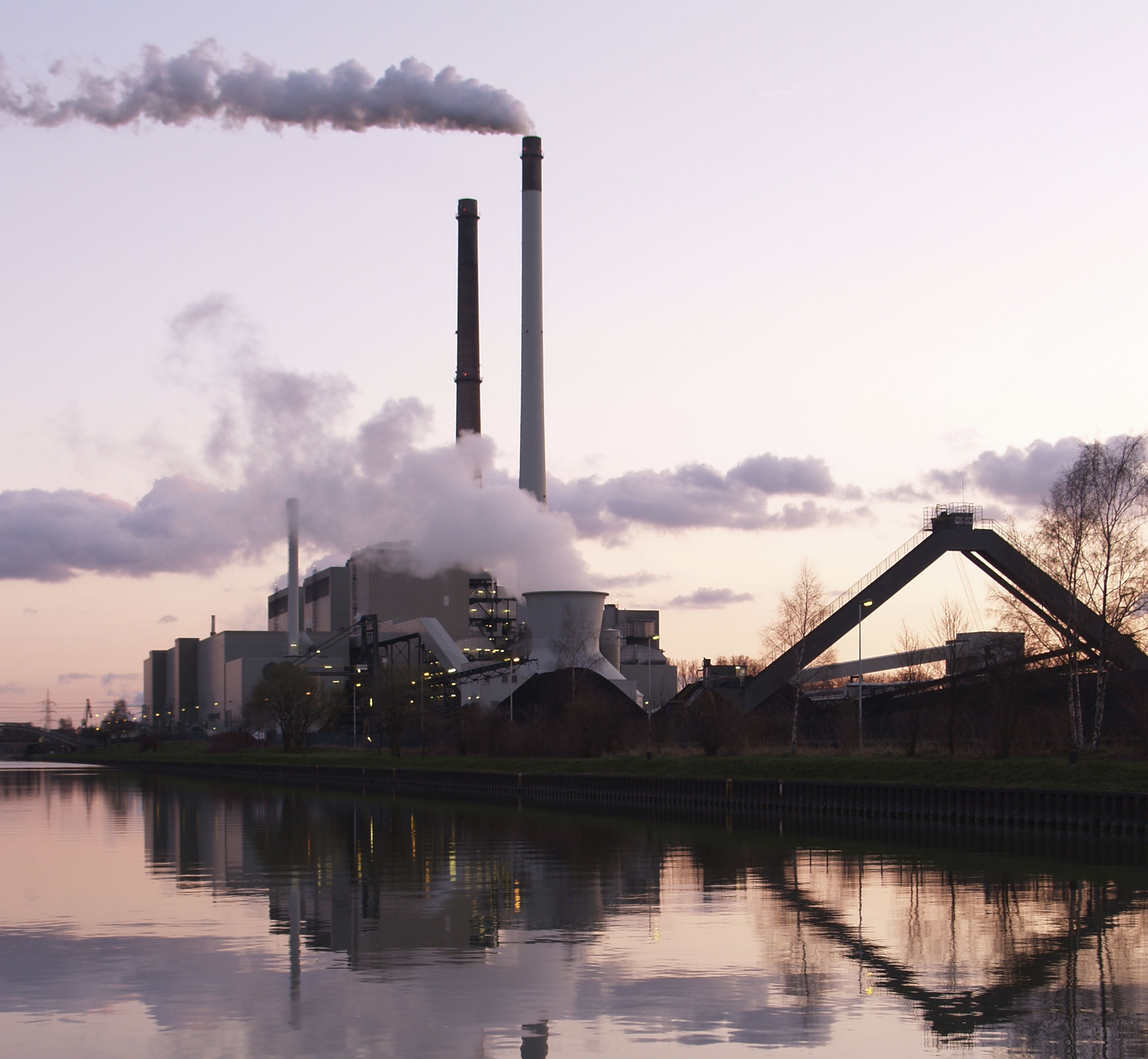
A coal power plant in Germany. Due to emissions trading, coal may become a less competitive fuel than other options.

Emissions trading is a market-oriented approach to controlling pollution by providing economic incentives for reducing the emissions of pollutants. The concept is also known as cap and trade (CAT) or emissions trading scheme (ETS). One prominent example is carbon emission trading for CO_{2} and other greenhouse gases which is a tool for climate change mitigation. Other schemes include sulfur dioxide and other pollutants.

In an emissions trading scheme, a central authority or governmental body allocates or sells a limited number (a "cap") of permits that allow a discharge of a specific quantity of a specific pollutant over a set time period. Polluters are required to hold permits in amount equal to their emissions. Polluters that want to increase their emissions must buy permits from others willing to sell them.

Emissions trading is a type of flexible environmental regulation that allows organizations and markets to decide how best to meet policy targets. This is in contrast to command-and-control environmental regulations such as best available technology (BAT) standards and government subsidies.

== Introduction ==
Pollution is a prime example of a market externality. An externality is an effect of some activity on an entity (such as a person) that is not party to a market transaction related to that activity. Emissions trading is a market-based approach to address pollution. The overall goal of an emissions trading plan is to minimize the cost of meeting a set emissions target. In an emissions trading system, the government sets an overall limit on emissions, and defines permits (also called allowances), or limited authorizations to emit, up to the level of the overall limit. The government may sell the permits, but in many existing schemes, it gives permits to participants (regulated polluters) equal to each participant's baseline emissions. The baseline is determined by reference to the participant's historical emissions. To demonstrate compliance, a participant must hold permits at least equal to the quantity of pollution it actually emitted during the time period. If every participant complies, the total pollution emitted will be at most equal to the sum of individual limits. Because permits can be bought and sold, a participant can choose either to use its permits exactly (by reducing its own emissions); or to emit less than its permits, and perhaps sell the excess permits; or to emit more than its permits, and buy permits from other participants. In effect, the buyer pays a charge for polluting, while the seller gains a reward for having reduced emissions.

Emissions Trading results in the incorporation of economic costs into the costs of production which incentivizes corporations to consider investment returns and capital expenditure decisions with a model that includes the price of carbon and greenhouse gases (GHG).

In many schemes, organizations which do not pollute (and therefore have no obligations) may also trade permits and financial derivatives of permits. In some schemes, participants can bank allowances to use in future periods. In some schemes, a proportion of all traded permits must be retired periodically, causing a net reduction in emissions over time. Thus, environmental groups may buy and retire permits, driving up the price of the remaining permits according to the law of demand. In most schemes, permit owners can donate permits to a nonprofit entity and receive a tax deductions. Usually, the government lowers the overall limit over time, with an aim towards a national emissions reduction target.

There are active trading programs in several air pollutants. An earlier application was the US national market to reduce acid rain. The United States now has several regional markets in nitrogen oxides.

== History ==
The efficiency of what later was to be called the "cap-and-trade" approach to air pollution abatement was first demonstrated in a series of micro-economic computer simulation studies between 1967 and 1970 for the National Air Pollution Control Administration (predecessor to the United States Environmental Protection Agency's Office of Air and Radiation) by Ellison Burton and William Sanjour. These studies used mathematical models of several cities and their emission sources in order to compare the cost and effectiveness of various control strategies. Each abatement strategy was compared with the "least-cost solution" produced by a computer optimization program to identify the least-costly combination of source reductions in order to achieve a given abatement goal. In each case it was found that the least-cost solution was dramatically less costly than the same amount of pollution reduction produced by any conventional abatement strategy. Burton and later Sanjour along with Edward H. Pechan continued improving and advancing these computer models at the newly created U.S. Environmental Protection Agency. The agency introduced the concept of computer modeling with least-cost abatement strategies (i.e., emissions trading) in its 1972 annual report to Congress on the cost of clean air. This led to the concept of "cap and trade" as a means of achieving the "least-cost solution" for a given level of abatement.

The development of emissions trading over the course of its history can be divided into four phases:

1. Gestation: Theoretical articulation of the instrument (by Coase, Crocker, Dales, Montgomery etc.) and, independent of the former, tinkering with "flexible regulation" at the US Environmental Protection Agency.
2. Proof of Principle: First developments towards trading of emission certificates based on the "offset-mechanism" taken up in Clean Air Act in 1977. A company could get allowance from the Act on a greater amount of emission when it paid another company to reduce the same pollutant.
3. Prototype: Launching of a first "cap-and-trade" system as part of the US Acid Rain Program in Title IV of the 1990 Clean Air Act, officially announced as a paradigm shift in environmental policy, as prepared by "Project 88", a network-building effort to bring together environmental and industrial interests in the US.
4. Regime formation: branching out from the US clean air policy to global climate policy, and from there to the European Union, along with the expectation of an emerging global carbon market and the formation of the "carbon industry".

In the United States, the acid rain related emission trading system was principally conceived by C. Boyden Gray, a G.H.W. Bush administration attorney. Gray worked with the Environmental Defense Fund (EDF), who worked with the EPA to write the bill that became law as part of the Clean Air Act of 1990. The new emissions cap on NO_{x} and SO_{2} gases took effect in 1995, and according to Smithsonian magazine, those acid rain emissions dropped 3 million tons that year.

== Economics ==
It is possible for a country to reduce emissions using a command-and-control approach, such as regulation, direct and indirect taxes. The cost of that approach differs between countries because the Marginal Abatement Cost Curve (MAC)—the cost of eliminating an additional unit of pollution—differs by country.

=== Coase model ===
Coase (1960) argued that social costs could be accounted for by negotiating property rights according to a particular objective. Coase's model assumes perfectly operating markets and equal bargaining power among those arguing for property rights. In Coase's model, efficiency, i.e., achieving a given reduction in emissions at lowest cost, is promoted by the market system. This can also be looked at from the perspective of having the greatest flexibility to reduce emissions. Flexibility is desirable because the marginal costs, that is to say, the incremental costs of reducing emissions, varies among countries. Emissions trading allows emission reductions to be first made in locations where the marginal costs of abatement are lowest (Bashmakov et al., 2001). Over time, efficiency can also be promoted by allowing "banking" of permits (Goldemberg et al., 1996, p. 30). This allows polluters to reduce emissions at a time when it is most efficient to do so.

=== Equity ===
One of the advantages of Coase's model is that it suggests that fairness (equity) can be addressed in the distribution of property rights, and that regardless of how these property rights are assigned, the market will produce the most efficient outcome. In reality, according to the held view, markets are not perfect, and it is therefore possible that a trade-off will occur between equity and efficiency (Halsnæs et al., 2007).

=== Trading ===
In an emissions trading system, permits may be traded by emitters who are liable to hold a sufficient number of permits in system. Some analysts argue that allowing others to participate in trading, e.g., private brokerage firms, can allow for better management of risk in the system, e.g., to variations in permit prices (Bashmakov et al., 2001). It may also improve the efficiency of system. According to Bashmakov et al. (2001), regulation of these other entities may be necessary, as is done in other financial markets, e.g., to prevent abuses of the system, such as insider trading.

=== Incentives and allocation ===
Emissions trading gives polluters an incentive to reduce their emissions. However, there are possible perverse incentives that can exist in emissions trading. Allocating permits on the basis of past emissions ("grandfathering") can result in firms having an incentive to maintain emissions. For example, a firm that reduced its emissions would receive fewer permits in the future (IMF, 2008, pp. 25–26). There are costs that emitters do face, e.g., the costs of the fuel being used, but there are other costs that are not necessarily included in the price of a good or service. These other costs are called external costs (Halsnæs et al., 2007). This problem can also be criticized on ethical grounds, since the polluter is being paid to reduce emissions (Goldemberg et al., 1996, p. 38). On the other hand, a permit system where permits are auctioned rather than given away, provides the government with revenues. These revenues might be used to improve the efficiency of overall climate policy, e.g., by funding energy efficiency programs (ACEEE 2019) or reductions in distortionary taxes (Fisher et al., 1996, p. 417).

In Coase's model of social costs, either choice (grandfathering or auctioning) leads to efficiency. In reality, grandfathering subsidizes polluters, meaning that polluting industries may be kept in business longer than would otherwise occur. Grandfathering may also reduce the rate of technological improvement towards less polluting technologies (Fisher et al., 1996, p. 417).

William Nordhaus argues that allocations cost the economy as they cause the under utilization an efficient form of taxation. Nordhaus argues that normal income, goods or service taxes distort efficient investment and consumption, so by using pollution taxes to generate revenue an emissions scheme can increase the efficiency of the economy.

Form of allocation

The economist Ross Garnaut states that permits allocated to existing emitters by 'grandfathering' are not 'free'. As the permits are scarce they have value and the benefit of that value is acquired in full by the emitter. The cost is imposed elsewhere in the economy, typically on consumers who cannot pass on the costs.

=== Market and least-cost ===
Some economists have urged the use of market-based instruments such as emissions trading to address environmental problems instead of prescriptive "command-and-control" regulation. Command and control regulation is criticized for being insensitive to geographical and technological differences, and therefore inefficient; however, this is not always so, as shown by the WWII rationing program in the U.S. in which local and regional boards made adjustments for these differences.

After an emissions limit has been set by a government political process, individual companies are free to choose how or whether to reduce their emissions. Failure to report emissions and surrender emission permits is often punishable by a further government regulatory mechanism, such as a fine that increases costs of production. Firms will choose the least-cost way to comply with the pollution regulation, which will lead to reductions where the least expensive solutions exist, while allowing emissions that are more expensive to reduce.

Under an emissions trading system, each regulated polluter has flexibility to use the most cost-effective combination of buying or selling emission permits, reducing its emissions by installing cleaner technology, or reducing its emissions by reducing production. The most cost-effective strategy depends on the polluter's marginal abatement cost and the market price of permits. In theory, a polluter's decisions should lead to an economically efficient allocation of reductions among polluters, and lower compliance costs for individual firms and for the economy overall, compared to command-and-control mechanisms.

=== Measuring, reporting, verification and enforcement ===
In some industrial processes, emissions can be physically measured by inserting sensors and flowmeters in chimneys and stacks, but many types of activity rely on theoretical calculations instead of measurement. Depending on local legislation, measurements may require additional checks and verification by government or third party auditors, prior or post submission to the local regulator.

Enforcement methods include fines and sanctions for polluters that have exceeded their allowances. Concerns include the cost of MRV and enforcement, and the risk that facilities may lie about actual emissions.

==== Pollution markets ====
An emission license directly confers a right to emit pollutants up to a certain rate. In contrast, a pollution license for a given location confers the right to emit pollutants at a rate which will cause no more than a specified increase at the pollution-level. For concreteness, consider the following model.

- There are $n$ agents each of which emits $e_i$ pollutants.
- There are $m$ locations each of which suffers pollution $q_i$.
- The pollution is a linear combination of the emissions. The relation between $e$ and $q$ is given by a diffusion matrix $H$, such that: $q = H\cdot e$.

As an example, consider three countries along a river (as in the fair river sharing setting).

- Pollution in the upstream country is determined only by the emission of the upstream country: $q_1 = e_1$.
- Pollution in the middle country is determined by its own emission and by the emission of country 1: $q_2 = e_1 + e_2$.
- Pollution in the downstream country is the sum of all emissions: $q_3 = e_1 + e_2 + e_3$.

So the matrix $H$ in this case is a triangular matrix of ones.

Each pollution-license for location $i$ permits its holder to emit pollutants that will cause at most this level of pollution at location $i$. Therefore, a polluter that affects water quality at a number of points has to hold a portfolio of licenses covering all relevant monitoring-points. In the above example, if country 2 wants to emit a unit of pollutant, it should purchase two permits: one for location 2 and one for location 3.

Montgomery shows that, while both markets lead to efficient license allocation, the market in pollution-licenses is more widely applicable than the market in emission-licenses.

=== International emissions trading ===
The nature of the pollutant plays a very important role when policy-makers decide which framework should be used to control pollution. CO_{2} acts globally, thus its impact on the environment is generally similar wherever in the globe it is released. So the location of the originator of the emissions does not matter from an environmental standpoint.

The policy framework is different for regional pollutants (e.g. SO_{2} and NO_{x}, and also mercury) because the impact of these pollutants may differ by location. The same amount of a regional pollutant can exert a very high impact in some locations and a low impact in other locations, so it matters where the pollutant is released. This is known as the Hot Spot problem.

A Lagrange framework is commonly used to determine the least cost of achieving an objective, in this case the total reduction in emissions required in a year. In some cases, it is possible to use the Lagrange optimization framework to determine the required reductions for each country (based on their MAC) so that the total cost of reduction is minimized. In such a scenario, the Lagrange multiplier represents the market allowance price (P) of a pollutant, such as the current market price of emission permits in Europe and the US.

Countries face the permit market price that exists in the market that day, so they are able to make individual decisions that would minimize their costs while at the same time achieving regulatory compliance. This is also another version of the Equi-Marginal Principle, commonly used in economics to choose the most economically efficient decision.

=== Prices versus quantities, and the safety valve ===
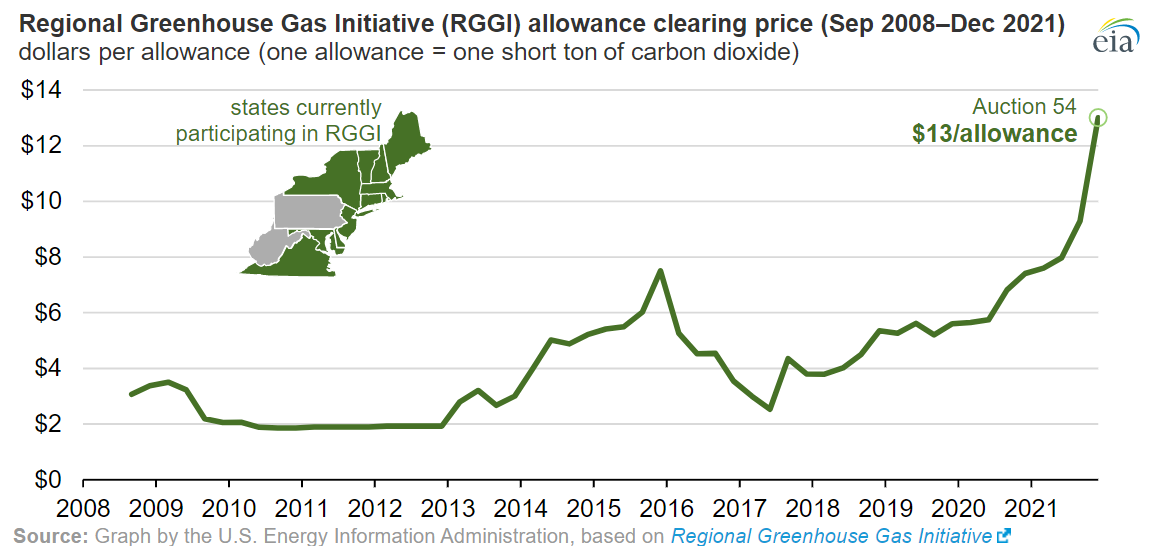
Quarterly clearing price of an allowance to emit a ton of carbon dioxide in the US Regional Greenhouse Gas Initiative, 2008–2021. The price of carbon emission has increased as the number of allowances issued has decreased.

There has been longstanding debate on the relative merits of price versus quantity instruments to achieve emission reductions.

An emission cap and permit trading system is a quantity instrument because it fixes the overall emission level (quantity) and allows the price to vary. Uncertainty in future supply and demand conditions (market volatility) coupled with a fixed number of pollution permits creates an uncertainty in the future price of pollution permits, and the industry must accordingly bear the cost of adapting to these volatile market conditions. The burden of a volatile market thus lies with the industry rather than the controlling agency, which is generally more efficient. However, under volatile market conditions, the ability of the controlling agency to alter the caps will translate into an ability to pick "winners and losers" and thus presents an opportunity for corruption.

In contrast, an emission tax is a price instrument because it fixes the price while the emission level is allowed to vary according to economic activity. A major drawback of an emission tax is that the environmental outcome (e.g. a limit on the amount of emissions) is not guaranteed. On one hand, a tax will remove capital from the industry, suppressing possibly useful economic activity, but conversely, the polluter will not need to hedge as much against future uncertainty since the amount of tax will track with profits. The burden of a volatile market will be borne by the controlling (taxing) agency rather than the industry itself, which is generally less efficient. An advantage is that, given a uniform tax rate and a volatile market, the taxing entity will not be in a position to pick "winners and losers" and the opportunity for corruption will be less.

Assuming no corruption and assuming that the controlling agency and the industry are equally efficient at adapting to volatile market conditions, the best choice depends on the sensitivity of the costs of emission reduction, compared to the sensitivity of the benefits (i.e., climate damage avoided by a reduction) when the level of emission control is varied.

A third option, known as a safety valve, is a hybrid of the price and quantity instruments. The system is essentially an emission cap and permit trading system but the maximum (or minimum) permit price is capped. Emitters have the choice of either obtaining permits in the marketplace or buying them from the government at a specified trigger price (which could be adjusted over time). The system is sometimes recommended as a way of overcoming the fundamental disadvantages of both systems by giving governments the flexibility to adjust the system as new information comes to light. It can be shown that by setting the trigger price high enough, or the number of permits low enough, the safety valve can be used to mimic either a pure quantity or pure price mechanism.

== Comparison with other methods of emission reduction ==
Cap and trade is the textbook example of an emissions trading program. Other market-based approaches include baseline-and-credit, and pollution tax. They all put a price on pollution (for example, see carbon price), and so provide an economic incentive to reduce pollution beginning with the lowest-cost opportunities. By contrast, in a command-and-control approach, a central authority designates pollution levels each facility is allowed to emit. Cap and trade essentially functions as a tax where the tax rate is variable based on the relative cost of abatement per unit, and the tax base is variable based on the amount of abatement needed.

=== Baseline and credit ===
In a baseline and credit program, polluters can create permits, called credits or offsets, by reducing their emissions below a baseline level, which is often the historical emissions level from a designated past year. Such credits can be bought by polluters that have a regulatory limit.

=== Pollution tax ===
Emissions fees or environmental tax is a surcharge on the pollution created while producing goods and services. For example, a carbon tax is a tax on the carbon content of fossil fuels that aims to discourage their use and thereby reduce carbon dioxide emissions. The two approaches are overlapping sets of policy designs. Both can have a range of scopes, points of regulation, and price schedules. They can be fair or unfair, depending on how the revenue is used. Both have the effect of increasing the price of goods (such as fossil fuels) to consumers. A comprehensive, upstream, auctioned cap-and-trade system is very similar to a comprehensive, upstream carbon tax. Yet, many commentators sharply contrast the two approaches.

The main difference is what is defined and what derived. A tax is a price control, while a cap-and-trade system is a quantity control instrument. That is, a tax is a unit price for pollution that is set by authorities, and the market determines the quantity emitted; in cap and trade, authorities determine the amount of pollution, and the market determines the price. This difference affects a number of criteria.

Responsiveness to inflation: Cap-and-trade has the advantage that it adjusts to inflation (changes to overall prices) automatically, while emissions fees must be changed by regulators.

Responsiveness to cost changes: It is not clear which approach is better. It is possible to combine the two into a safety valve price: a price set by regulators, at which polluters can buy additional permits beyond the cap.

Responsiveness to recessions: This point is closely related to responsiveness to cost changes, because recessions cause a drop in demand. Under cap and trade, the emissions cost automatically decreases, so a cap-and-trade scheme adds another automatic stabilizer to the economy—in effect, an automatic fiscal stimulus. However, a lower pollution price also results in reduced efforts to reduce pollution. If the government is able to stimulate the economy regardless of the cap-and-trade scheme, an excessively low price causes a missed opportunity to cut emissions faster than planned. Instead, it might be better to have a price floor (a tax). This is especially true when cutting pollution is urgent, as with greenhouse gas emissions. A price floor also provides certainty and stability for investment in emissions reductions: recent experience from the UK shows that nuclear power operators are reluctant to invest on "un-subsidized" terms unless there is a guaranteed price floor for carbon (which the EU emissions trading scheme does not presently provide).

Responsiveness to uncertainty: As with cost changes, in a world of uncertainty, it is not clear whether emissions fees or cap-and-trade systems are more efficient—it depends on how fast the marginal social benefits of reducing pollution fall with the amount of cleanup (e.g., whether inelastic or elastic marginal social benefit schedule).

Other: The magnitude of the tax will depend on how sensitive the supply of emissions is to the price. The permit price of cap-and-trade will depend on the pollutant market. A tax generates government revenue, but full-auctioned emissions permits can do the same. A similar upstream cap-and-trade system could be implemented. An upstream carbon tax might be the simplest to administer. Setting up a complex cap-and-trade arrangement that is comprehensive has high institutional needs.

=== Command-and-control regulation ===
Command and control is a system of regulation that prescribes emission limits and compliance methods for each facility or source. It is the traditional approach to reducing air pollution.

Command-and-control regulations are more rigid than incentive-based approaches such as pollution fees and cap and trade. An example of this is a performance standard which sets an emissions goal for each polluter that is fixed and, therefore, the burden of reducing pollution cannot be shifted to the firms that can achieve it more cheaply. As a result, performance standards are likely to be more costly overall. The additional costs would be passed to end consumers.

== Trading systems ==
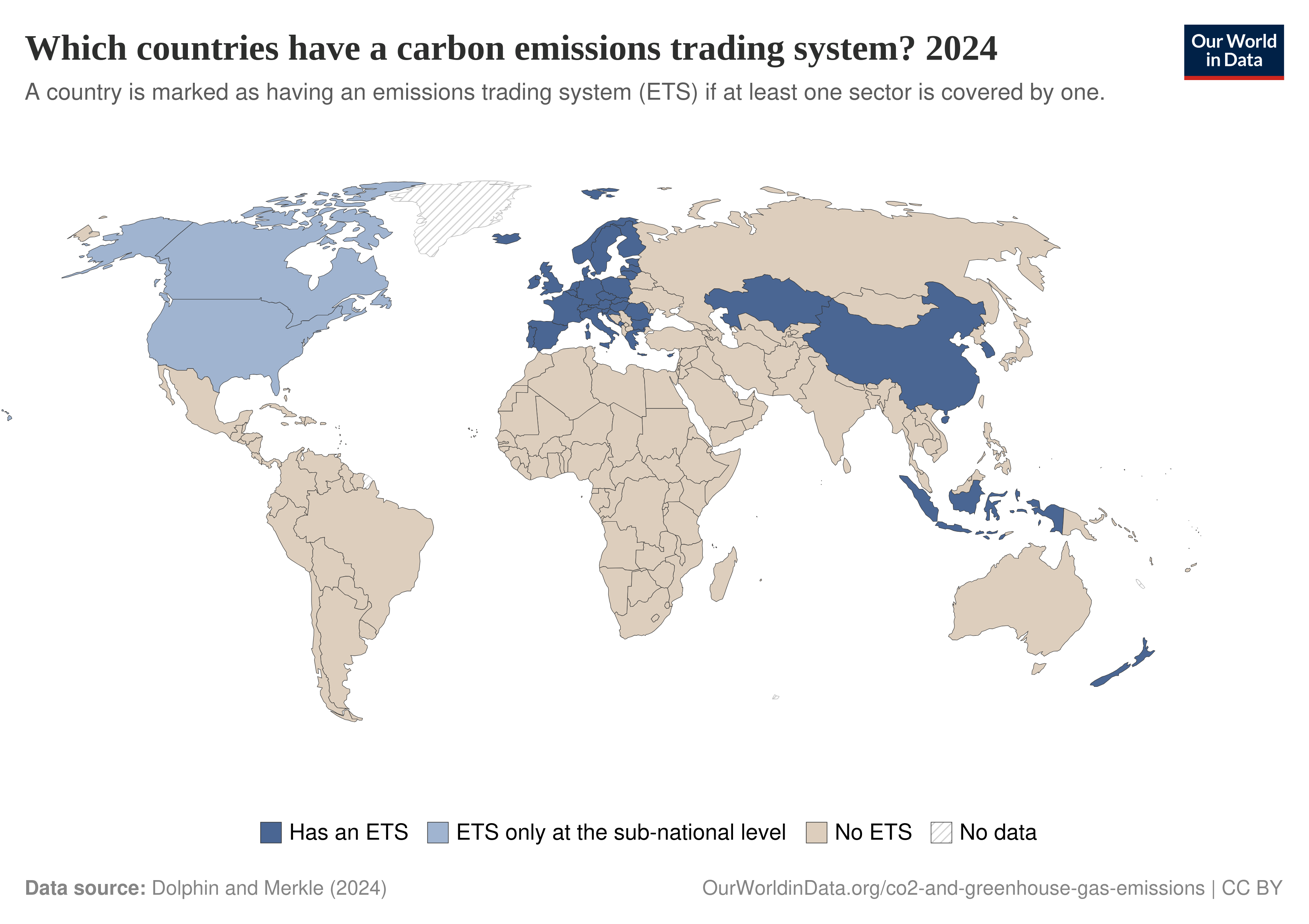
Countries with an emission trading system in at least one sector in 2024

Apart from the dynamic development in carbon emission trading, other pollutants have also been targeted.

=== United States ===
==== Sulfur dioxide ====
An early example of an emission trading system has been the sulfur dioxide (SO_{2}) trading system under the framework of the Acid Rain Program of the 1990 Clean Air Act in the U.S. Under the program, which is essentially a cap-and-trade emissions trading system, SO_{2} emissions were reduced by 50% from 1980 levels by 2007. Some experts argue that the cap-and-trade system of SO_{2} emissions reduction has reduced the cost of controlling acid rain by as much as 80% versus source-by-source reduction. The SO_{2} program was challenged in 2004, which set in motion a series of events that led to the 2011 Cross-State Air Pollution Rule (CSAPR). Under the CSAPR, the national SO_{2} trading program was replaced by four separate trading groups for SO_{2} and NO_{x}. SO_{2} emissions from Acid Rain Program sources have fallen from 17.3 million tons in 1980 to about 7.6 million tons in 2008, a decrease in emissions of 56 percent. A 2014 EPA analysis estimated that implementation of the Acid Rain Program avoided between 20,000 and 50,000 incidences of premature mortality annually due to reductions of ambient PM2.5 concentrations, and between 430 and 2,000 incidences annually due to reductions of ground-level ozone.

==== Nitrogen oxides ====
In 2003, the Environmental Protection Agency (EPA) began to administer the NO_{x} Budget Trading Program (NBP) under the NO_{x} State Implementation Plan (also known as the "NOx SIP Call"). The NO_{x} Budget Trading Program was a market-based cap and trade program created to reduce emissions of nitrogen oxides (NO_{x}) from power plants and other large combustion sources in the eastern United States. NO_{x} is a prime ingredient in the formation of ground-level ozone (smog), a pervasive air pollution problem in many areas of the eastern United States. The NBP was designed to reduce NO_{x} emissions during the warm summer months, referred to as the ozone season, when ground-level ozone concentrations are highest. In March 2008, EPA again strengthened the 8-hour ozone standard to 0.075 parts per million (ppm) from its previous 0.08 ppm.

Ozone season NO_{x} emissions decreased by 43 percent between 2003 and 2008, even while energy demand remained essentially flat during the same period. CAIR will result in $85 billion to $100 billion in health benefits and nearly $2 billion in visibility benefits per year by 2015 and will substantially reduce premature mortality in the eastern United States. NOx reductions due to the NO_{x} Budget Trading Program have led to improvements in ozone and PM2.5, saving an estimated 580 to 1,800 lives in 2008.

A 2017 study in the American Economic Review found that the NO_{x} Budget Trading Program decreased NO_{x} emissions and ambient ozone concentrations. The program reduced expenditures on medicine by about 1.5% ($800 million annually) and reduced the mortality rate by up to 0.5% (2,200 fewer premature deaths, mainly among individuals 75 and older).

==== Volatile organic compounds ====
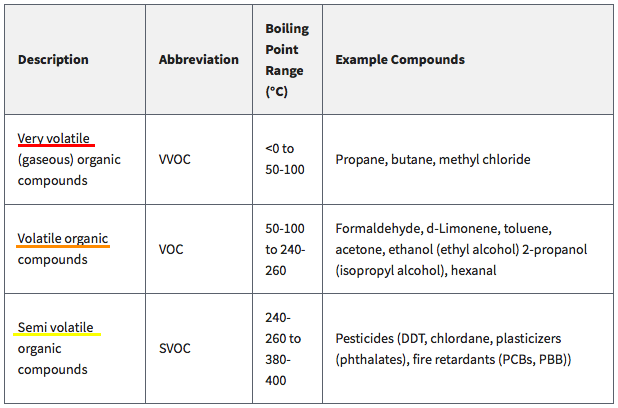
Classification of Organic Pollutants

In the United States the Environmental Protection Agency (EPA) classifies Volatile Organic Compounds (VOCs) as gases emitted from certain solids and liquids that may have adverse health effects. These VOCs include a variety of chemicals that are emitted from a variety of different products. These include products such as gasoline, perfumes, hair spray, fabric cleaners, PVC, and refrigerants; all of which can contain chemicals such as benzene, acetone, methylene chloride, freons, formaldehyde.

VOCs are also monitored by the United States Geological Survey for its presence in groundwater supply. The USGS concluded that many of the nations aquifers are at risk to low-level VOC contamination. The common symptoms of short levels of exposure to VOCs include headaches, nausea, and eye irritation. If exposed for an extended period of time the symptoms include cancer and damage to the central nervous system.

=== China ===
In an effort to reverse the adverse consequences of air pollution, in 2006, China started to consider a national pollution permit trading system in order to use market-based mechanisms to incentivize companies to cut pollution. This has been based on a previous pilot project called the Industrial SO_{2} emission trading pilot scheme, which was launched in 2002. Four provinces, three municipalities and one state-owned enterprise were involved in this pilot project (also known as the 4+3+1 project). They are Shandong, Shanxi, Jiangsu, Henan, Shanghai, Tianjin, Liuzhou and China Huaneng Group, a state-owned company in the power industry.

In 2014, when the Chinese government started considering a national level pollution permit trading system again, there were more than 20 local pollution permit trading platforms. The Yangtze River Delta region as a whole has also run test trading, but the scale was limited. In the same year, the Chinese government proposed establishing a carbon market, focused on CO_{2} reduction later in the decade, and it is a separate system from the pollution permit trading.

Following these regional efforts, China established its national Emissions Trading System in 2017.

A 2021 study in PNAS found that China's emissions trading system effectively reduced firm emissions despite low carbon prices and infrequent trading. The system reduced total emissions by 16.7% and emission intensity by 9.7%.

=== Linked trading systems ===
Distinct cap-and-trade systems can be linked together through the mutual or unilateral recognition of emissions allowances for compliance. Linking systems creates a larger carbon market, which can reduce overall compliance costs, increase market liquidity and generate a more stable carbon market. Linking systems can also be politically symbolic as it shows willingness to undertake a common effort to reduce GHG emissions. Some scholars have argued that linking may provide a starting point for developing a new, bottom-up international climate policy architecture, whereby multiple unique systems successively link their various systems.

In 2014, the U.S. state of California (which is the world's fifth largest economy if it were a nation, between Germany and the United Kingdom in size) and the Canadian province of Québec successfully linked their systems. In 2015, the provinces of Ontario and Manitoba agreed to join the linked system between Quebec and California. On 22 September 2017, the premiers of Quebec and Ontario, and the Governor of California, signed the formal agreement establishing the linkage.

=== Renewable energy certificates ===
Renewable Energy Certificates (occasionally referred to as or "green tags"), are a largely unrelated form of market-based instruments that are used to achieve renewable energy targets, which may be environmentally motivated (like emissions reduction targets), but may also be motivated by other aims, such as energy security or industrial policy.

== Criticism ==
=== Distributional effects ===
The US Congressional Budget Office (CBO, 2009) examined the potential effects of the American Clean Energy and Security Act on US households. This act relies heavily on the free allocation of permits. The Bill was found to protect low-income consumers, but it was recommended that the Bill be made more efficient by reducing welfare provisions for corporations, and that more resources be made available for consumer relief. A cap-and-trade initiative in the U.S. Northeast caused concerns it would be regressive and poorer households would absorb most of the new tax.

== Effectiveness ==
A 2008 book compiling research on emissions trading in the European Union cautiously endorses the effectiveness of emissions trading in practice: "Notably for the greenhouse gas emissions problem, emissions trading seems to be very much suited to reaching the necessary reductions in a cost-effective way." Recent empirical research supports this assessment. A 2024 systematic review and meta-analysis of 80 ex-post evaluations across 21 carbon-pricing systems found average emissions reductions of approximately 5–21% after implementation (around 4–15% after correcting for publication bias). Firm-level causal evidence also indicates that the EU Emissions Trading System reduced regulated manufacturers' CO₂ emissions by 14–16% without detectable losses in output or employment, achieved primarily through investments that lowered emissions intensity and no observed carbon leakage.

== See also ==
- Acid Rain Retirement Fund
- AP 42 Compilation of Air Pollutant Emission Factors
- Asia-Pacific Emissions Trading Forum
- Emission standard
- Green certificate
- Green investment scheme
- Mobile emission reduction credit (MERC)
