= Electoral results for the Division of Hume =

Australian division election results

This is a list of electoral results for the Division of Hume in Australian federal elections from the division's creation in 1901 until the present.

== Members ==
Member	Party	Term
Sir William Lyne	Protectionist	1901–1909
Sir William Lyne	Independent	1909–1913
Robert Patten	Liberal	1913–1917
Franc Falkiner	Nationalist	1917–1919
Parker Moloney	Labor	1919–1931
Thomas Collins	Country	1931–1943
Arthur Fuller	Labor	1943–1949
Charles Anderson	Country	1949–1951
Arthur Fuller	Labor	1951–1955
Charles Anderson	Country	1955–1961
Arthur Fuller	Labor	1961–1963
Ian Pettitt	Country	1963–1972
Frank Olley	Labor	1972–1974
Stephen Lusher	Country, National	1974–1984
Wal Fife	Liberal	1984–1993
John Sharp	National	1993–1998
Alby Schultz	Liberal	1998–2013
Angus Taylor	Liberal	2013–present

== Election results ==
=== Elections in the 2020s ===
==== 2025 ====
2025 Australian federal election: Hume
Party	Candidate	Votes	%	±%
Liberal	Angus Taylor	43,615	43.85	+1.32
Labor	Thomas Huang	27,073	27.22	+3.07
Greens	Steve Bruce	8,455	8.50	+2.85
One Nation	Helen Ducker	7,967	8.01	+0.07
Independent	Peter McLean	4,435	4.46	+4.46
Trumpet of Patriots	Troy Wozniak	3,472	3.49	+3.49
Family First	Bryan Seidel	2,721	2.74	+2.74
Libertarian	Adrian Rees	1,729	1.74	+0.62
Total formal votes		99,467	91.09	−1.63
Informal votes		9,729	8.91	+1.63
Turnout		109,196	92.97	+7.86
Two-party-preferred result
Liberal	Angus Taylor	57,747	58.06	+1.19
Labor	Thomas Huang	41,720	41.94	−1.19
Liberal hold		Swing	+1.19	

==== 2022 ====
2022 Australian federal election: Hume
Party	Candidate	Votes	%	±%
Liberal	Angus Taylor	45,177	43.12	−10.17
Labor	Greg Baines	20,864	19.92	−6.65
Independent	Penny Ackery	16,045	15.32	+15.32
One Nation	Rebecca Thompson	7,700	7.35	+7.35
Greens	Karen Stewart	5,194	4.96	−0.14
United Australia	Garry Dollin	4,780	4.56	−0.26
Shooters, Fishers, Farmers	Ross Seller	3,108	2.97	+2.97
Independent	Sheneli Meneripitiyage Dona	1,124	1.07	+1.07
Liberal Democrats	Joaquim de Lima	770	0.73	+0.73
Total formal votes		104,762	92.87	−0.67
Informal votes		8,040	7.13	+0.67
Turnout		112,802	92.68	−1.41
Two-party-preferred result
Liberal	Angus Taylor	60,467	57.72	−5.27
Labor	Greg Baines	44,295	42.28	+5.27
Liberal hold		Swing	−5.27	

Alluvial diagram for preference flows in the seat of Hume in the 2022 federal election. indicates at what stage the winning candidate had over 50% of the votes and was declared the winner.

=== Elections in the 2010s ===
==== 2019 ====
2019 Australian federal election: Hume
Party	Candidate	Votes	%	±%
Liberal	Angus Taylor	54,589	53.29	−0.54
Labor	Aoife Champion	27,223	26.57	−5.27
Independent	Huw Kingston	6,068	5.92	+5.92
Greens	David Powell	5,224	5.10	−1.51
United Australia	Lynda Abdo	4,939	4.82	+4.82
Conservative National	Tanya Hargraves	2,493	2.43	+2.43
Christian Democrats	Ian Nebauer	1,906	1.86	−1.86
Total formal votes		102,442	93.54	−1.16
Informal votes		7,080	6.46	+1.16
Turnout		109,522	94.09	+0.52
Two-party-preferred result
Liberal	Angus Taylor	64,527	62.99	+2.81
Labor	Aoife Champion	37,915	37.01	−2.81
Liberal hold		Swing	+2.81	

==== 2016 ====
2016 Australian federal election: Hume
Party	Candidate	Votes	%	±%
Liberal	Angus Taylor	51,103	53.83	−2.45
Labor	Aoife Champion-Fashoyin	30,221	31.84	+6.37
Greens	Michaela Sherwood	6,274	6.61	+0.98
Christian Democrats	Adrian Van der Byl	3,533	3.72	+1.86
Bullet Train	Trevor Anthoney	2,267	2.39	+2.39
Citizens Electoral Council	Lindsay Cosgrove	1,530	1.61	+0.73
Total formal votes		94,928	94.70	+1.42
Informal votes		5,311	5.30	−1.42
Turnout		100,239	93.57	+1.46
Two-party-preferred result
Liberal	Angus Taylor	57,127	60.18	−3.40
Labor	Aoife Champion-Fashoyin	37,801	39.82	+3.40
Liberal hold		Swing	−3.40	

==== 2013 ====
2013 Australian federal election: Hume
Party	Candidate	Votes	%	±%
Liberal	Angus Taylor	49,105	53.97	+0.41
Labor	Michael Pilbrow	23,711	26.06	−5.80
Greens	Zaza Chevalier	5,218	5.73	−1.92
Palmer United	Jason Cornelius	4,015	4.41	+4.41
One Nation	Lynette Styles	2,521	2.77	+2.77
Independent	James Harker-Mortlock	2,096	2.30	+2.30
Katter's Australian	Bruce Nicholson	1,658	1.82	+1.82
Christian Democrats	Adrian Van Der Byl	1,397	1.54	−0.22
Citizens Electoral Council	Lindsay Cosgrove	1,273	1.40	+1.40
Total formal votes		90,994	93.68	−1.19
Informal votes		6,142	6.32	+1.19
Turnout		97,136	94.93	−0.02
Two-party-preferred result
Liberal	Angus Taylor	55,938	61.47	+2.75
Labor	Michael Pilbrow	35,056	38.53	−2.75
Liberal hold		Swing	+2.75	

==== 2010 ====
2010 Australian federal election: Hume
Party	Candidate	Votes	%	±%
Liberal	Alby Schultz	47,137	53.56	+12.96
Labor	Robin Saville	28,044	31.86	−5.06
Greens	Kevin Watchirs	6,737	7.65	+1.49
Family First	Charles Liptak	2,075	2.36	+0.53
Christian Democrats	Karen Buttigieg	1,546	1.76	+0.09
Democrats	Greg Butler	1,280	1.45	+1.36
Liberal Democrats	Lisa Milat	1,197	1.36	+1.36
Total formal votes		88,016	94.87	−1.56
Informal votes		4,764	5.13	+1.56
Turnout		92,780	94.97	−0.83
Two-party-preferred result
Liberal	Alby Schultz	51,679	58.72	+3.37
Labor	Robin Saville	36,337	41.28	−3.37
Liberal hold		Swing	+3.37	

=== Elections in the 2000s ===
==== 2007 ====
2007 Australian federal election: Hume
Party	Candidate	Votes	%	±%
Liberal	Alby Schultz	41,344	49.18	−7.45
Labor	David Grant	31,882	37.93	+8.88
Greens	Jim Clark	6,414	7.63	+0.68
Christian Democrats	Geoff Peet	2,010	2.39	−1.09
Family First	Cathy Trent	1,958	2.33	+2.33
Citizens Electoral Council	Lindsay Cosgrove	455	0.54	−0.08
Total formal votes		84,063	96.61	+1.68
Informal votes		2,946	3.39	−1.68
Turnout		87,009	96.18	+0.92
Two-party-preferred result
Liberal	Alby Schultz	45,526	54.16	−8.68
Labor	David Grant	38,537	45.84	+8.68
Liberal hold		Swing	−8.68	

==== 2004 ====
2004 Australian federal election: Hume
Party	Candidate	Votes	%	±%
Liberal	Alby Schultz	46,652	57.63	+4.64
Labor	Graeme Shannon	22,862	28.24	−1.34
Greens	David Robert Horton	5,264	6.50	+2.16
Christian Democrats	Geoff Peet	2,880	3.56	+3.56
Independent	Peter Martin	1,023	1.26	+1.26
Independent	Arthur Schofield	1,011	1.25	+1.25
Democrats	Giuseppe Minissale	713	0.88	−3.88
Citizens Electoral Council	Lindsay Cosgrove	541	0.67	+0.67
Total formal votes		80,946	94.55	−1.90
Informal votes		4,669	5.45	+1.90
Turnout		85,615	95.57	−0.16
Two-party-preferred result
Liberal	Alby Schultz	51,908	64.13	+4.34
Labor	Graeme Shannon	29,038	35.87	−4.34
Liberal hold		Swing	+4.34	

==== 2001 ====
2001 Australian federal election: Hume
Party	Candidate	Votes	%	±%
Liberal	Alby Schultz	41,899	52.99	+7.45
Labor	Jan Merriman	23,389	29.58	−2.74
One Nation	Charlie Prell	6,589	8.33	−2.29
Democrats	James Roxburgh	3,762	4.76	+0.82
Greens	Kevin Watchirs	3,435	4.34	+1.38
Total formal votes		79,074	96.45	+0.11
Informal votes		2,908	3.55	−0.11
Turnout		81,982	96.15	
Two-party-preferred result
Liberal	Alby Schultz	47,278	59.79	+2.46
Labor	Jan Merriman	31,796	40.21	−2.46
Liberal hold		Swing	+2.46	

=== Elections in the 1990s ===
==== 1998 ====
1998 Australian federal election: Hume
Party	Candidate	Votes	%	±%
Liberal	Alby Schultz	28,299	40.92	+40.92
Labor	Mick Veitch	22,466	32.49	−2.28
One Nation	Wayne Hickson	7,471	10.80	+10.80
National	Christine Ferguson	6,433	9.30	−47.74
Democrats	Greg Butler	1,817	2.63	−2.95
Greens	Jan Green	1,560	2.26	−0.36
Independent	Dave Cox	551	0.80	+0.80
Independent	Philip Fowler	413	0.60	+0.60
Citizens Electoral Council	Jean McClung	142	0.21	+0.21
Total formal votes		69,152	95.49	−1.92
Informal votes		3,269	4.51	+1.92
Turnout		72,421	96.26	−0.68
Two-party-preferred result
Liberal	Alby Schultz	40,149	58.06	+58.06
Labor	Mick Veitch	29,003	41.94	+3.71
Liberal gain from National		Swing	+58.06	

==== 1996 ====
1996 Australian federal election: Hume
Party	Candidate	Votes	%	±%
National	John Sharp	40,921	57.04	+23.44
Labor	Tony Hewson	24,943	34.77	−7.02
Democrats	Dave Cox	4,001	5.58	+3.02
Greens	Kevin Watchirs	1,876	2.61	+2.61
Total formal votes		71,741	97.40	−0.48
Informal votes		1,912	2.60	+0.48
Turnout		73,653	96.94	+0.00
Two-party-preferred result
National	John Sharp	44,174	61.77	+8.07
Labor	Tony Hewson	27,345	38.23	−8.07
National hold		Swing	+8.07	

==== 1993 ====
1993 Australian federal election: Hume
Party	Candidate	Votes	%	±%
Labor	Phil Archer	29,773	41.79	+2.03
National	John Sharp	23,942	33.60	+6.18
Liberal	Stephen Ward	13,681	19.20	−2.63
Independent	Dave Cox	2,028	2.85	+2.85
Democrats	Ian Buchanan	1,824	2.56	−6.31
Total formal votes		71,248	97.88	+0.27
Informal votes		1,542	2.12	−0.27
Turnout		72,790	96.94	
Two-party-preferred result
National	John Sharp	38,244	53.70	−0.84
Labor	Phil Archer	32,975	46.30	+0.84
National gain from Liberal		Swing	+53.70	

==== 1990 ====
1990 Australian federal election: Hume
Party	Candidate	Votes	%	±%
Liberal	Wal Fife	34,229	51.6	−1.1
Labor	George Martin	23,072	34.8	−3.6
Democrats	Glenn Roberts	4,581	6.9	+3.0
Independent	David Jones	3,773	5.7	+5.7
Independent	Doug Kirkwood	633	1.0	+1.0
Total formal votes		66,288	97.9	
Informal votes		1,420	2.1	
Turnout		67,708	95.9	
Two-party-preferred result
Liberal	Wal Fife	38,539	58.2	+0.7
Labor	George Martin	27,639	41.8	−0.7
Liberal hold		Swing	+0.7	

=== Elections in the 1980s ===
==== 1987 ====
1987 Australian federal election: Hume
Party	Candidate	Votes	%	±%
Liberal	Wal Fife	33,687	52.7	+21.5
Labor	Rod Milliken	24,516	38.4	−0.9
Democrats	Scott Milne	2,498	3.9	+3.9
Independent	Jim Eldridge	1,843	2.9	+2.9
Nuclear Disarmament	Duncan Marshall	1,105	1.7	+1.7
Independent	David Herald	243	0.4	+0.4
Total formal votes		63,892	97.5	
Informal votes		1,632	2.5	
Turnout		65,524	94.0	
Two-party-preferred result
Liberal	Wal Fife	36,750	57.5	−0.2
Labor	Rod Milliken	27,137	42.5	+0.2
Liberal hold		Swing	−0.2	

==== 1984 ====
1984 Australian federal election: Hume
Party	Candidate	Votes	%	±%
Labor	Rodney Milliken	24,342	39.3	−3.7
Liberal	Wal Fife	19,331	31.2	+7.3
National	Stephen Lusher	18,245	29.5	−1.2
Total formal votes		61,918	96.5	
Informal votes		2,275	3.5	
Turnout		64,193	95.4	
Two-party-preferred result
Liberal	Wal Fife	35,695	57.7	+57.7
Labor	Rodney Milliken	26,221	42.3	−3.4
Liberal gain from National		Swing	+57.7	

==== 1983 ====
1983 Australian federal election: Hume
Party	Candidate	Votes	%	±%
National	Stephen Lusher	36,217	54.2	−1.8
Labor	Marie McCormick	27,195	40.7	−1.1
Democrats	Gregory Butler	3,419	5.1	+2.9
Total formal votes		66,831	98.9	
Informal votes		762	1.1	
Turnout		67,593	95.9	
Two-party-preferred result
National	Stephen Lusher		56.8	−0.1
Labor	Marie McCormick		43.2	+0.1
National hold		Swing	−0.1	

==== 1980 ====
1980 Australian federal election: Hume
Party	Candidate	Votes	%	±%
National Country	Stephen Lusher	37,013	56.0	−1.0
Labor	Sue West	27,614	41.8	+3.4
Democrats	Gwendoline Wilson	1,478	2.2	−2.3
Total formal votes		66,105	98.8	
Informal votes		832	1.2	
Turnout		66,937	95.3	
Two-party-preferred result
National Country	Stephen Lusher		56.9	−2.4
Labor	Sue West		43.1	+2.4
National Country hold		Swing	−2.4	

=== Elections in the 1970s ===
==== 1977 ====
1977 Australian federal election: Hume
Party	Candidate	Votes	%	±%
National Country	Stephen Lusher	37,521	57.0	+3.2
Labor	George Brenner	25,266	38.4	−1.4
Democrats	Mark Richard	2,986	4.5	+4.5
Total formal votes		65,773	98.8	
Informal votes		815	1.2	
Turnout		66,588	96.1	
Two-party-preferred result
National Country	Stephen Lusher		59.3	−0.9
Labor	George Brenner		40.7	+0.9
National Country hold		Swing	−0.9	

==== 1975 ====
1975 Australian federal election: Hume
Party	Candidate	Votes	%	±%
National Country	Stephen Lusher	27,746	57.0	+17.4
Labor	George Brenner	20,925	43.0	−4.4
Total formal votes		48,671	98.7	
Informal votes		665	1.3	
Turnout		49,336	96.4	
National Country hold		Swing	+6.3	

==== 1974 ====
1974 Australian federal election: Hume
Party	Candidate	Votes	%	±%
Labor	Frank Olley	22,640	47.4	−2.7
Country	Stephen Lusher	18,882	39.6	−5.2
Liberal	Graham Thompson	4,942	10.4	+10.4
Australia	John Gedye	1,253	2.6	+2.6
Total formal votes		47,717	98.4	
Informal votes		759	1.6	
Turnout		48,476	96.9	
Two-party-preferred result
Country	Stephen Lusher	24,185	50.7	+2.6
Labor	Frank Olley	23,532	49.3	−2.6
Country gain from Labor		Swing	+2.6	

==== 1972 ====
1972 Australian federal election: Hume
Party	Candidate	Votes	%	±%
Labor	Frank Olley	22,364	50.1	+4.0
Country	Ian Pettitt	20,005	44.8	−1.7
Democratic Labor	John Hogan	2,273	5.1	−2.3
Total formal votes		44,642	99.3	
Informal votes		330	0.7	
Turnout		44,972	96.5	
Two-party-preferred result
Labor	Frank Olley		51.9	+2.9
Country	Ian Pettitt		48.1	−2.9
Labor gain from Country		Swing	+2.9	

=== Elections in the 1960s ===
==== 1969 ====
1969 Australian federal election: Hume
Party	Candidate	Votes	%	±%
Country	Ian Pettitt	20,845	46.5	−7.5
Labor	Frank Olley	20,691	46.1	+7.5
Democratic Labor	James Manwaring	3,331	7.4	+0.1
Total formal votes		44,867	99.1	
Informal votes		428	0.9	
Turnout		45,295	96.1	
Two-party-preferred result
Country	Ian Pettitt		51.0	−8.0
Labor	Frank Olley		49.0	+8.0
Country hold		Swing	−8.0	

==== 1966 ====
1966 Australian federal election: Hume
Party	Candidate	Votes	%	±%
Country	Ian Pettitt	19,435	50.5	+22.0
Labor	John Menadue	16,189	42.1	−4.0
Democratic Labor	John Hogan	2,825	7.3	+0.7
Total formal votes		38,449	98.4	
Informal votes		607	1.6	
Turnout		39,056	96.4	
Two-party-preferred result
Country	Ian Pettitt		55.5	+4.7
Labor	John Menadue		44.5	−4.7
Country hold		Swing	+4.7	

==== 1963 ====
1963 Australian federal election: Hume
Party	Candidate	Votes	%	±%
Labor	Arthur Fuller	37,931	46.1	−2.5
Country	Ian Pettitt	11,078	28.5	−14.5
Liberal	Geoffrey Ashton	7,299	18.8	+18.8
Democratic Labor	Charles Rowe	2,574	6.6	−1.7
Total formal votes		38,882	99.0	
Informal votes		408	1.0	
Turnout		39,290	97.0	
Two-party-preferred result
Country	Ian Pettitt	19,746	50.8	+1.7
Labor	Arthur Fuller	19,136	49.2	−1.7
Country gain from Labor		Swing	+1.7	

==== 1961 ====
1961 Australian federal election: Hume
Party	Candidate	Votes	%	±%
Labor	Arthur Fuller	18,858	48.6	+2.3
Country	Charles Anderson	16,682	43.0	−5.6
Democratic Labor	Charles Rowe	3,234	8.3	+3.3
Total formal votes		38,774	98.8	
Informal votes		488	1.2	
Turnout		39,262	96.5	
Two-party-preferred result
Labor	Arthur Fuller	19,738	50.9	+3.0
Country	Charles Anderson	19,036	49.1	−3.0
Labor gain from Country		Swing	+3.0	

=== Elections in the 1950s ===
==== 1958 ====
1958 Australian federal election: Hume
Party	Candidate	Votes	%	±%
Country	Charles Anderson	19,056	48.6	−3.6
Labor	Arthur Fuller	18,164	46.3	−1.5
Democratic Labor	Raymond Nolan	1,974	5.0	+5.0
Total formal votes		39,194	98.3	
Informal votes		679	1.7	
Turnout		39,873	96.4	
Two-party-preferred result
Country	Charles Anderson	20,401	52.1	−0.1
Labor	Arthur Fuller	18,793	47.9	+0.1
Country hold		Swing	−0.1	

==== 1955 ====
1955 Australian federal election: Hume
Party	Candidate	Votes	%	±%
Country	Charles Anderson	20,494	52.2	+19.8
Labor	Arthur Fuller	18,779	47.8	−2.7
Total formal votes		39,273	98.4	
Informal votes		651	1.6	
Turnout		39,924	96.4	
Country gain from Labor		Swing	+3.5	

==== 1954 ====
1954 Australian federal election: Hume
Party	Candidate	Votes	%	±%
Labor	Arthur Fuller	19,617	50.4	+0.1
Country	Charles Anderson	12,459	32.0	−17.7
Liberal	Linden Roth	6,845	17.6	+17.6
Total formal votes		38,921	99.4	
Informal votes		248	0.6	
Turnout		39,169	97.0	
Two-party-preferred result
Labor	Arthur Fuller		52.2	+1.9
Country	Charles Anderson		47.8	−1.9
Labor hold		Swing	+1.9	

==== 1951 ====
1951 Australian federal election: Hume
Party	Candidate	Votes	%	±%
Labor	Arthur Fuller	18,849	50.3	+1.3
Country	Charles Anderson	18,622	49.7	−1.3
Total formal votes		37,471	99.0	
Informal votes		374	1.0	
Turnout		37,845	96.2	
Labor gain from Country		Swing	+1.3	

=== Elections in the 1940s ===
==== 1949 ====
1949 Australian federal election: Hume
Party	Candidate	Votes	%	±%
Country	Charles Anderson	18,871	51.0	+18.8
Labor	Arthur Fuller	18,104	49.0	−4.2
Total formal votes		36,975	98.9	
Informal votes		428	1.1	
Turnout		37,403	96.3	
Country gain from Labor		Swing	+5.9	

==== 1946 ====
1946 Australian federal election: Hume
Party	Candidate	Votes	%	±%
Labor	Arthur Fuller	26,720	51.8	+2.2
Country	Warren McDonald	17,474	33.9	−4.4
Liberal	Geoffrey Davey	7,397	14.3	+14.3
Total formal votes		51,591	98.3	
Informal votes		872	1.7	
Turnout		52,463	92.4	
Two-party-preferred result
Labor	Arthur Fuller		54.2	−2.1
Country	Warren McDonald		45.8	+2.1
Labor hold		Swing	−2.1	

==== 1943 ====
1943 Australian federal election: Hume
Party	Candidate	Votes	%	±%
Labor	Arthur Fuller	25,420	49.6	+26.7
Country	Thomas Collins	19,629	38.3	−3.9
Independent	Vernon Lawrence	4,667	9.1	+9.1
Communist	John McLeod	1,143	2.2	+2.2
Liberal Democratic	John Neeld	406	0.8	+0.8
Total formal votes		51,265	97.6	
Informal votes		1,242	2.4	
Turnout		52,507	96.0	
Two-party-preferred result
Labor	Arthur Fuller		56.3	+7.2
Country	Thomas Collins		43.7	−7.2
Labor gain from Country		Swing	+7.2	

==== 1940 ====
1940 Australian federal election: Hume
Party	Candidate	Votes	%	±%
Country	Thomas Collins	21,369	42.2	−11.9
Labor	Clarence Nolan	11,584	22.9	−23.0
Labor (N-C)	Arthur Fuller	11,037	21.8	+21.8
Defence Movement	Eric Roberts	4,188	8.3	+8.3
State Labor	John Fisher	2,473	4.9	+4.9
Total formal votes		50,661	98.0	
Informal votes		1,026	2.0	
Turnout		51,687	93.8	
Two-party-preferred result
Country	Thomas Collins	25,791	50.9	−3.2
Labor	Clarence Nolan	24,870	49.1	+3.2
Country hold		Swing	−3.2	

=== Elections in the 1930s ===
==== 1937 ====
1937 Australian federal election: Hume
Party	Candidate	Votes	%	±%
Country	Thomas Collins	27,784	54.1	+1.2
Labor	Essell Hoad	23,526	45.9	+32.1
Total formal votes		51,310	98.4	
Informal votes		853	1.6	
Turnout		52,163	96.4	
Country hold		Swing	−2.3	

==== 1934 ====
1934 Australian federal election: Hume
Party	Candidate	Votes	%	±%
Country	Thomas Collins	26,298	52.9	−1.0
Labor (NSW)	Essell Hoad	16,492	33.2	+22.1
Labor	Gerald O'Sullivan	6,877	13.8	−20.0
Total formal votes		49,667	98.3	
Informal votes		862	1.7	
Turnout		50,529	95.7	
Two-party-preferred result
Country	Thomas Collins		56.4	−1.3
Labor (NSW)	Essell Hoad		43.6	+43.6
Country hold		Swing	−1.3	

==== 1931 ====
1931 Australian federal election: Hume
Party	Candidate	Votes	%	±%
Country	Thomas Collins	22,836	54.6	+11.2
Labor	Parker Moloney	14,208	34.0	−22.6
Labor (NSW)	Lynden Regan	4,771	11.4	+11.4
Total formal votes		41,815	98.2	
Informal votes		775	1.8	
Turnout		42,590	96.4	
Two-party-preferred result
Country	Thomas Collins		57.5	+14.1
Labor	Parker Moloney		42.5	−14.1
Country gain from Labor		Swing	+14.1	

=== Elections in the 1920s ===
==== 1929 ====
1929 Australian federal election: Hume
Party	Candidate	Votes	%	±%
Labor	Parker Moloney	23,144	56.6	+3.9
Country	Thomas Fitzpatrick	17,743	43.4	+16.1
Total formal votes		40,887	97.9	
Informal votes		878	2.1	
Turnout		41,765	95.9	
Labor hold		Swing	+1.9	

==== 1928 ====
1928 Australian federal election: Hume
Party	Candidate	Votes	%	±%
Labor	Parker Moloney	20,852	52.7	+2.3
Country	William Fleming	10,797	27.3	+11.2
Nationalist	Jack Garry	7,906	20.0	−13.5
Total formal votes		39,555	97.0	
Informal votes		1,235	3.0	
Turnout		40,790	93.8	
Two-party-preferred result
Labor	Parker Moloney		54.7	+2.7
Country	William Fleming		45.3	−2.7
Labor hold		Swing	+2.7	

==== 1925 ====
1925 Australian federal election: Hume
Party	Candidate	Votes	%	±%
Labor	Parker Moloney	18,860	50.4	−2.5
Nationalist	Angus Campbell	12,529	33.5	+5.9
Country	Victor Miers	6,011	16.1	−3.4
Total formal votes		37,400	98.4	
Informal votes		605	1.6	
Turnout		38,005	90.7	
Two-party-preferred result
Labor	Parker Moloney		52.0	−2.9
Nationalist	Angus Campbell		48.0	+2.9
Labor hold		Swing	−2.9	

==== 1922 ====
1922 Australian federal election: Hume
Party	Candidate	Votes	%	±%
Labor	Parker Moloney	12,494	52.9	+1.1
Nationalist	Fred Belbridge	6,518	27.6	+4.1
Country	Cyril James	4,616	19.5	−4.0
Total formal votes		23,628	95.5	
Informal votes		1,111	4.5	
Turnout		24,739	62.0	
Two-party-preferred result
Labor	Parker Moloney		54.9	+0.7
Nationalist	Fred Belbridge		45.1	−0.7
Labor hold		Swing	+0.7	

=== Elections in the 1910s ===
==== 1919 ====
1919 Australian federal election: Hume
Party	Candidate	Votes	%	±%
Labor	Parker Moloney	11,702	52.6	+4.5
Nationalist	Edwin Townsend	5,288	23.8	−28.1
Farmers and Settlers	Charles Milthorpe	5,149	23.1	+23.1
Independent	Andrew Scambler	125	0.6	+0.6
Total formal votes		22,264	92.8	
Informal votes		1,735	7.2	
Turnout		23,999	70.7	
Two-party-preferred result
Labor	Parker Moloney		57.5	+9.4
Nationalist	Edwin Townsend		42.5	−9.4
Labor gain from Nationalist		Swing	+9.4	

==== 1917 ====
1917 Australian federal election: Hume
Party	Candidate	Votes	%	±%
Nationalist	Franc Falkiner	13,714	51.9	+0.9
Labor	Robert Cruickshank	12,732	48.1	−0.9
Total formal votes		26,446	97.2	
Informal votes		772	2.8	
Turnout		27,218	75.1	
Nationalist hold		Swing	+0.9	

==== 1914 ====
1914 Australian federal election: Hume
Party	Candidate	Votes	%	±%
Liberal	Robert Patten	13,841	51.0	+0.3
Labor	Patrick Sullivan	13,320	49.0	+49.0
Total formal votes		27,161	97.7	
Informal votes		645	2.3	
Turnout		27,806	76.2	
Liberal hold		Swing	+0.3	

==== 1913 ====
1913 Australian federal election: Hume
Party	Candidate	Votes	%	±%
Liberal	Robert Patten	11,575	50.7	+16.2
Independent	Sir William Lyne	11,236	49.3	−9.6
Total formal votes		22,811	96.4	
Informal votes		858	3.6	
Turnout		23,669	68.1	
Liberal gain from Independent		Swing	+16.2	

==== 1910 ====
1910 Australian federal election: Hume
Party	Candidate	Votes	%	±%
Independent	Sir William Lyne	9,322	66.4	+66.4
Liberal	Bernard Grogan	4,708	33.6	−66.4
Total formal votes		14,030	98.2	
Informal votes		251	1.8	
Turnout		14,281	55.6	
Independent gain from Liberal		Swing	+66.4	

=== Elections in the 1900s ===
==== 1906 ====
1906 Australian federal election: Hume
Party	Candidate	Votes	%	±%
Protectionist	Sir William Lyne	9,223	61.7	+1.7
Anti-Socialist	James Gibb	5,727	38.3	−1.7
Total formal votes		14,950	98.2	
Informal votes		274	1.8	
Turnout		15,224	60.8	
Protectionist hold		Swing	+1.7	

==== 1903 ====
1903 Australian federal election: Hume
Party	Candidate	Votes	%	±%
Protectionist	Sir William Lyne	7,113	60.0	+5.9
Free Trade	Francis McLean	4,749	40.0	−5.9
Total formal votes		11,862	98.6	
Informal votes		166	1.4	
Turnout		12,028	54.1	
Protectionist hold		Swing	+5.9	

==== 1901 ====
1901 Australian federal election: Hume
Party	Candidate	Votes	%	±%
Protectionist	Sir William Lyne	3,965	54.1	+54.1
Free Trade	William Goddard	3,359	45.9	+45.9
Total formal votes		7,324	98.8	
Informal votes		88	1.2	
Turnout		7,412	68.2	
Protectionist win		(new seat)		
