= Electoral results for the district of Hornsby =

Election results for Hornsby, New South Wales, Australia

Hornsby, an electoral district of the Legislative Assembly in the Australian state of New South Wales, has had two incarnations, the first from 1927 to 1991, the second from 1999 to the present.

== Members for Hornsby ==
First incarnation (1927–1991)
Election	Member	Party
1927	James Shand	Nationalist
1930	James Shand	Nationalist
1932	James Shand	United Australia
1935	James Shand	United Australia
1938	James Shand	United Australia
1941	Sydney Storey	Independent
1944	Sydney Storey	Independent
1947	Sydney Storey	Liberal
1950	Sydney Storey	Liberal
1953	Sydney Storey	Liberal
1956	Sydney Storey	Liberal
1959	Sydney Storey	Liberal
1962	John Maddison	Liberal
1965	John Maddison	Liberal
1968	John Maddison	Liberal
1971	John Maddison	Liberal
1973	Neil Pickard	Liberal
1976	Neil Pickard	Liberal
1978	Neil Pickard	Liberal
1981	Neil Pickard	Liberal
1984	Neil Pickard	Liberal
1988	Neil Pickard	Liberal
Second incarnation (1999–present)
Election	Member	Party
1999	Stephen O'Doherty	Liberal
2002 by	Judy Hopwood	Liberal
2003	Judy Hopwood	Liberal
2007	Judy Hopwood	Liberal
2011	Matt Kean	Liberal
2015	Matt Kean	Liberal
2019	Matt Kean	Liberal
2023	Matt Kean	Liberal
2024 by	James Wallace	Liberal

== Election results ==
=== Elections in the 2020s ===
==== 2024 by-election ====
2024 Hornsby by-election
Party	Candidate	Votes	%	±%
Liberal	James Wallace	24,578	49.93	+6.64
Greens	Tania Salitra	12,713	25.83	+11.54
One Nation	Steve Busch	2,740	5.57	−2.36
Independent	Brendon Clarke	2,205	4.48	+4.48
Independent	Benjamin Caswell	1,680	3.41	+0.54
Animal Justice	Sheila Milgate	1,616	3.28	+3.28
Libertarian	Marc Hendrickx	1,508	3.06	−0.86
Sustainable Australia	Justin Thomas	1,337	2.72	+1.03
Independent	Roger Woodward	847	1.72	+1.72
Total formal votes		49,224	96.75	−0.89
Informal votes		1,655	3.25	+0.89
Turnout		50,879	83.06	−8.95
Two-candidate-preferred result
Liberal	James Wallace	26,781	64.34	+6.30
Greens	Tania Salitra	14,840	35.66	+35.66
Liberal hold		Swing	N/A	

==== 2023 ====
2023 New South Wales state election: Hornsby
Party	Candidate	Votes	%	±%
Liberal	Matt Kean	23,451	43.3	−11.6
Labor	Melissa Hoile	13,418	24.8	+4.0
Greens	Tania Salitra	7,738	14.3	+3.3
One Nation	Steve Busch	4,298	7.9	+4.5
Liberal Democrats	Jeffrey Grimshaw	2,125	3.9	+3.9
Independent	Benjamin Caswell	1,557	2.9	+2.9
Sustainable Australia	Justin Thomas	918	1.7	+1.7
Independent	Adrian Dignam	661	1.2	+1.2
Total formal votes		54,166	97.6	+0.1
Informal votes		1,308	2.4	−0.1
Turnout		55,474	92.0	+0.2
Two-party-preferred result
Liberal	Matt Kean	26,506	58.0	−8.8
Labor	Melissa Hoile	19,163	42.0	+8.8
Liberal hold		Swing	−8.8	

=== Elections in the 2010s ===
==== 2019 ====
2019 New South Wales state election: Hornsby
Party	Candidate	Votes	%	±%
Liberal	Matt Kean	26,269	52.53	−5.84
Labor	Katie Gompertz	9,683	19.36	+0.01
Greens	Joe Nicita	6,131	12.26	−1.63
Independent	Mick Gallagher	2,287	4.57	−0.20
One Nation	Emma Eros	2,250	4.50	+4.50
Keep Sydney Open	Hayden Gray	1,192	2.38	+2.38
Conservatives	Andrew Isaac	893	1.79	+1.79
Sustainable Australia	Justin Thomas	835	1.67	+1.67
Independent	John Murray	463	0.93	+0.93
Total formal votes		50,003	97.53	−0.19
Informal votes		1,268	2.47	+0.19
Turnout		51,271	92.92	−0.46
Two-party-preferred result
Liberal	Matt Kean	28,700	66.30	−2.64
Labor	Katie Gompertz	14,585	33.70	+2.64
Liberal hold		Swing	−2.64	

==== 2015 ====
2015 New South Wales state election: Hornsby
Party	Candidate	Votes	%	±%
Liberal	Matt Kean	29,097	58.4	+8.1
Labor	Steve Ackerman	9,647	19.4	+8.4
Greens	John Storey	6,925	13.9	+1.4
Independent	Mick Gallagher	2,379	4.8	+1.4
Christian Democrats	Leighton Thew	1,256	2.5	−0.8
No Land Tax	Mary Di Cosmo	542	1.1	+1.1
Total formal votes		49,846	97.7	+0.8
Informal votes		1,164	2.3	−0.8
Turnout		51,010	93.4	+1.0
Two-party-preferred result
Liberal	Matt Kean	31,225	68.9	−7.5
Labor	Steve Ackerman	14,065	31.1	+7.5
Liberal hold		Swing	−7.5	

==== 2011 ====
2011 New South Wales state election: Hornsby
Party	Candidate	Votes	%	±%
Liberal	Matt Kean	23,317	49.4	−3.5
Independent	Nick Berman	10,418	22.1	+22.1
Greens	Toni Wright-Turner	5,242	11.1	+0.6
Labor	Nicholas Car	4,846	10.3	−12.6
Independent	Mick Gallagher	1,876	4.0	+0.9
Christian Democrats	Leighton Thew	1,495	3.2	−1.5
Total formal votes		47,194	97.5	−0.1
Informal votes		1,228	2.5	+0.1
Turnout		48,422	94.5	+0.7
Notional two-party-preferred count
Liberal	Matt Kean	29,618	77.1	+11.6
Labor	Nicholas Car	8,797	22.9	−11.6
Two-candidate-preferred result
Liberal	Matt Kean	25,158	62.1	−4.4
Independent	Nick Berman	15,361	37.9	+37.9
Liberal hold		Swing	−4.4	

=== Elections in the 2000s ===
==== 2007 ====
2007 New South Wales state election: Hornsby
Party	Candidate	Votes	%	±%
Liberal	Judy Hopwood	23,636	52.9	+8.6
Labor	Janelle McIntosh	10,201	22.8	−10.5
Greens	Catherine Turner	4,714	10.5	+1.6
Christian Democrats	Leighton Thew	2,067	4.6	+1.4
Independent	Mick Gallagher	1,389	3.1	+0.1
Unity	Fei Zhou	878	2.0	+0.0
Democrats	Peter Fallon	676	1.5	+0.0
AAFI	Lyndon Shepherd	640	1.4	+0.0
Independent	Ian Johnston	494	1.1	+1.1
Total formal votes		44,695	97.6	−0.3
Informal votes		1,110	2.4	+0.3
Turnout		45,805	93.8	
Two-party-preferred result
Liberal	Judy Hopwood	26,118	66.5	+12.3
Labor	Janelle McIntosh	13,137	33.5	−12.3
Liberal hold		Swing	+12.3	

==== 2003 ====
2003 New South Wales state election: Hornsby
Party	Candidate	Votes	%	±%
Liberal	Judy Hopwood	18,780	44.2	+3.1
Labor	Susan White	14,696	34.6	+0.8
Greens	Wendy McMurdo	3,967	9.3	+5.5
Independent	Mick Gallagher	1,659	3.9	−0.7
Christian Democrats	John Salvaggio	1,408	3.3	+3.3
Unity	William Chan	715	1.7	−0.3
AAFI	David Wadsworth	615	1.4	+0.5
Democrats	Kate Orman	608	1.4	−3.5
Total formal votes		42,448	98.0	+0.3
Informal votes		857	2.0	−0.3
Turnout		43,305	92.9	
Two-party-preferred result
Liberal	Judy Hopwood	20,321	53.1	+0.4
Labor	Susan White	17,923	46.9	−0.4
Liberal hold		Swing	+0.4	

==== 2002 by-election ====
2002 Hornsby by-election Saturday 23 February
Party	Candidate	Votes	%	±%
Liberal	Judy Hopwood	18,206	48.12	−4.57
Independent	John Muirhead	6,634	17.54	
Greens	Tony Mohr	4,975	13.15	+9.39
Independent	Mick Gallagher	4,675	12.36	+7.8
Democrats	Joanna Wong	2,296	6.07	+1.2
Christian Democrats	Owen Nannelli	1,045	2.76	
Total formal votes		37,831	97.73	+0.05
Informal votes		878	2.27	−0.05
Turnout		39,188	85.51	−7.41
Two-candidate-preferred result
Liberal	Judy Hopwood	20,096	60.16	
Independent	John Muirhead	13,309	39.84	
Liberal hold		Swing	+7.46 (Note: compared to the two-party-preferred result for the 1999 Hornsby election.)	

Stephen O'Doherty (Liberal) resigned.

=== Elections in the 1990s ===
==== 1999 ====
1999 New South Wales state election: Hornsby
Party	Candidate	Votes	%	±%
Liberal	Stephen O'Doherty	16,976	41.1	−11.2
Labor	Scott Cardamatis	13,966	33.8	+8.8
Democrats	Alicia Swallow	2,012	4.9	−2.0
Independent	Chris Meany	1,925	4.7	+4.7
Independent	Mick Gallagher	1,882	4.6	−7.4
One Nation	Peter Jansson	1,679	4.1	+4.1
Greens	Steve Douglas	1,554	3.8	+3.8
Unity	Xiaogang Zhang	817	2.0	+2.0
AAFI	David Mudgee	363	0.9	−1.6
Independent	Russell Howe	141	0.3	+0.3
Total formal votes		41,315	97.7	+1.5
Informal votes		982	2.3	−1.5
Turnout		42,297	92.9	
Two-party-preferred result
Liberal	Stephen O'Doherty	19,065	52.7	−11.0
Labor	Scott Cardamatis	17,117	47.3	+11.0
Liberal notional hold		Swing	−11.0	

District re-created

==== 1991–1999 ====
District abolished

=== Elections in the 1980s ===
==== 1988 ====
1988 New South Wales state election: Hornsby
Party	Candidate	Votes	%	±%
Liberal	Neil Pickard	18,591	61.5	+4.0
Labor	Alan Wells	9,664	32.0	−6.1
Independent	Michael Voorbij	1,951	6.5	+6.5
Total formal votes		30,206	97.2	−1.1
Informal votes		873	2.8	+1.1
Turnout		31,079	94.2	
Two-party-preferred result
Liberal	Neil Pickard	19,259	64.7	+5.0
Labor	Alan Wells	10,529	35.3	−5.0
Liberal hold		Swing	+5.0	

==== 1984 ====
1984 New South Wales state election: Hornsby
Party	Candidate	Votes	%	±%
Liberal	Neil Pickard	18,177	56.7	+5.2
Labor	Christopher Gorrick	12,339	38.5	−5.5
Democrats	Michael Pettigrew	1,520	4.7	+1.5
Total formal votes		32,036	98.3	+1.0
Informal votes		562	1.7	−1.0
Turnout		32,598	92.3	−0.6
Two-party-preferred result
Liberal	Neil Pickard		59.2	+5.4
Labor	Christopher Gorrick		40.8	−5.4
Liberal hold		Swing	+5.4	

==== 1981 ====
1981 New South Wales state election: Hornsby
Party	Candidate	Votes	%	±%
Liberal	Neil Pickard	15,814	51.5	
Labor	Christopher Gorrick	13,507	44.0	
Democrats	John Haydon	996	3.2	
Independent	Timothy Daly	381	1.2	
Total formal votes		30,698	97.3	
Informal votes		845	2.7	
Turnout		31,543	92.9	
Two-party-preferred result
Liberal	Neil Pickard	16,314	53.8	+5.5
Labor	Christopher Gorrick	14,007	46.2	−5.5
Liberal notional gain from Labor		Swing	+5.5	

The sitting member was Neil Pickard (Liberal), however Hornsby had become notionally held by Labor due to the redistribution.

=== Elections in the 1970s ===
==== 1978 ====
1978 New South Wales state election: Hornsby
Party	Candidate	Votes	%	±%
Liberal	Neil Pickard	16,769	50.8	−10.8
Labor	Christopher Gorrick	16,207	49.2	+10.8
Total formal votes		32,976	97.4	−0.7
Informal votes		887	2.6	+0.7
Turnout		33,863	92.3	−3.0
Liberal hold		Swing	−10.8	

==== 1976 ====
1976 New South Wales state election: Hornsby
Party	Candidate	Votes	%	±%
Liberal	Neil Pickard	20,107	61.6	+1.6
Labor	Hans Eisler	12,555	38.4	+5.2
Total formal votes		32,662	98.1	+0.2
Informal votes		619	1.9	−0.2
Turnout		33,281	95.3	+2.1
Liberal hold		Swing	−3.8	

==== 1973 ====
1973 New South Wales state election: Hornsby
Party	Candidate	Votes	%	±%
Liberal	Neil Pickard	17,788	60.0	+5.6
Labor	Brian Silvia	9,852	33.2	+33.2
Democratic Labor	Cecil Wallace	2,021	6.8	+0.3
Total formal votes		29,661	97.9	
Informal votes		647	2.1	
Turnout		30,308	93.2	
Two-party-preferred result
Liberal	Neil Pickard	19,405	65.4	+5.6
Labor	Brian Silvia	10,256	34.6	+34.6
Liberal hold		Swing	+5.6	

==== 1971 ====
1971 New South Wales state election: Hornsby
Party	Candidate	Votes	%	±%
Liberal	John Maddison	13,938	54.4	−14.7
Independent	David Hill	7,200	28.1	+28.1
Australia	George Black	2,825	11.0	+11.0
Democratic Labor	Anthony Felton	1,668	6.5	+0.7
Total formal votes		25,631	98.1	
Informal votes		491	1.9	
Turnout		26,122	93.6	
Two-candidate-preferred result
Liberal	John Maddison	16,185	63.1	−10.6
Independent	David Hill	9,446	36.9	+36.9
Liberal hold		Swing	−10.6	

=== Elections in the 1960s ===
==== 1968 ====
1968 New South Wales state election: Hornsby
Party	Candidate	Votes	%	±%
Liberal	John Maddison	18,929	69.1	−0.5
Labor	Kenneth Reid	6,882	25.1	+0.3
Democratic Labor	Anthony Felton	1,591	5.8	+0.1
Total formal votes		27,402	97.0	
Informal votes		849	3.0	
Turnout		28,251	93.9	
Two-party-preferred result
Liberal	John Maddison	20,202	73.7	+1.4
Labor	Kenneth Reid	7,200	26.3	−1.4
Liberal hold		Swing	+1.4	

==== 1965 ====
1965 New South Wales state election: Hornsby
Party	Candidate	Votes	%	±%
Liberal	John Maddison	21,191	69.6	+15.4
Labor	Terrence Foster	7,543	24.8	+0.1
Democratic Labor	Anthony Felton	1,723	5.7	+5.7
Total formal votes		30,457	98.4	−0.5
Informal votes		491	1.6	+0.5
Turnout		30,948	93.6	−0.6
Two-party-preferred result
Liberal	John Maddison	22,569	74.1	+4.1
Labor	Terrence Foster	7,888	25.9	−4.1
Liberal hold		Swing	+4.1	

==== 1962 ====
1962 New South Wales state election: Hornsby
Party	Candidate	Votes	%	±%
Liberal	John Maddison	14,508	54.2	−15.5
Labor	Percy Staines	6,604	24.7	−5.6
Independent	Sydney Storey	3,494	13.1	+13.1
Independent	Robert Turner	2,141	8.0	+8.0
Total formal votes		26,747	98.9	
Informal votes		307	1.1	
Turnout		27,054	94.2	
Two-party-preferred result
Liberal	John Maddison	18,723	70.0	−0.4
Labor	Percy Staines	8,024	30.0	+0.4
Liberal hold		Swing	−0.4	

=== Elections in the 1950s ===
==== 1959 ====
1959 New South Wales state election: Hornsby
Party	Candidate	Votes	%	±%
Liberal	Sydney Storey	16,234	66.7	
Labor	Arthur Evans	8,087	33.3	
Total formal votes		24,321	98.2	
Informal votes		447	1.8	
Turnout		24,768	92.4	
Liberal hold		Swing		

==== 1956 ====
1956 New South Wales state election: Hornsby
Party	Candidate	Votes	%	±%
Liberal	Sydney Storey	16,665	69.1	+8.6
Labor	Francis O'Connell	7,447	30.9	+30.9
Total formal votes		24,112	98.4	+0.6
Informal votes		402	1.6	−0.6
Turnout		24,514	93.1	+0.5
Liberal hold		Swing	N/A	

==== 1953 ====
1953 New South Wales state election: Hornsby
Party	Candidate	Votes	%	±%
Liberal	Sydney Storey	12,744	60.5	
Independent	Leslie Matthews	6,868	32.6	
Independent	Victor Taylor	1,438	6.8	
Total formal votes		21,050	97.8	
Informal votes		465	2.2	
Turnout		21,515	92.6	
Two-candidate-preferred result
Liberal	Sydney Storey	13,463	63.9	
Independent	Leslie Matthews	7,587	36.1	
Liberal hold		Swing		

==== 1950 ====
1950 New South Wales state election: Hornsby
Party	Candidate	Votes	%	±%
Liberal	Sydney Storey	14,753	67.2	
Labor	Roy Shirvington	7,215	32.8	
Total formal votes		21,968	98.6	
Informal votes		303	1.4	
Turnout		22,271	92.1	
Liberal hold		Swing		

=== Elections in the 1940s ===
==== 1947 ====
1947 New South Wales state election: Hornsby
Party	Candidate	Votes	%	±%
Liberal	Jeffrey Blaxland	9,203	37.2	−2.3
Liberal	Sydney Storey	7,649	30.9	+30.9
Labor	George Manuel	6,491	26.2	+26.2
Independent	Charles Somerville	1,401	5.7	+5.7
Total formal votes		24,744	97.3	+1.1
Informal votes		693	2.7	−1.1
Turnout		25,437	94.1	+4.8
Two-candidate-preferred result
Liberal	Sydney Storey	13,385	54.1	
Liberal	Jeffrey Blaxland	11,359	45.9	
Member changed to Liberal from Independent		Swing	N/A	

==== 1944 ====
1944 New South Wales state election: Hornsby
Party	Candidate	Votes	%	±%
Independent	Sydney Storey	9,885	49.9	+10.8
Democratic	Howard Beale	7,815	39.5	−1.2
Lang Labor	James Mahony	2,102	10.6	+10.6
Total formal votes		19,802	96.2	+0.8
Informal votes		781	3.8	−0.8
Turnout		20,583	89.3	−1.4
Two-candidate-preferred result
Independent	Sydney Storey	11,347	57.3	+7.2
Democratic	Howard Beale	8,455	42.7	−7.2
Independent hold		Swing	+7.2	

==== 1941 ====
1941 New South Wales state election: Hornsby
Party	Candidate	Votes	%	±%
United Australia	Wilfred Frances	7,509	40.7	
Ind. United Australia	Sydney Storey	7,216	39.1	
Independent	Albert French	3,743	20.3	
Total formal votes		18,468	95.4	
Informal votes		886	4.6	
Turnout		19,354	90.7	
Two-candidate-preferred result
Ind. United Australia	Sydney Storey	9,249	50.1	
United Australia	Wilfred Frances	9,219	49.9	
Ind. United Australia gain from United Australia		Swing		

=== Elections in the 1930s ===
==== 1938 ====
1938 New South Wales state election: Hornsby
Party	Candidate	Votes	%	±%
United Australia	James Shand	8,238	39.4	−41.9
United Australia	Sydney Storey	6,012	28.7	+28.7
United Australia	William Henson	4,936	23.6	+23.6
Independent	Howard Miscamble	1,741	8.3	+8.3
Total formal votes		20,927	95.4	+8.1
Informal votes		1,010	4.6	−8.1
Turnout		21,937	95.6	+0.3
Two-candidate-preferred result
United Australia	James Shand	11,082	53.0	
United Australia	Sydney Storey	9,845	47.0	
United Australia hold		Swing	N/A	

==== 1935 ====
1935 New South Wales state election: Hornsby
Party	Candidate	Votes	%	±%
United Australia	James Shand	14,464	81.3	+5.4
Centre	Fergus Munro	3,324	18.7	+18.7
Total formal votes		17,788	87.3	−11.1
Informal votes		2,586	12.7	+11.1
Turnout		20,374	95.3	−0.2
United Australia hold		Swing	N/A	

==== 1932 ====
1932 New South Wales state election: Hornsby
Party	Candidate	Votes	%	±%
United Australia	James Shand	14,462	75.9	+13.8
Labor (NSW)	Charles Hankin	4,599	24.1	−12.5
Total formal votes		19,061	98.4	+0.8
Informal votes		318	1.6	−0.8
Turnout		19,379	95.5	+0.2
United Australia hold		Swing	N/A	

==== 1930 ====
1930 New South Wales state election: Hornsby
Party	Candidate	Votes	%	±%
Nationalist	James Shand	11,168	62.1	
Labor	George Osborne	6,594	36.6	
Communist	Samuel Frew	233	1.3	
Total formal votes		17,995	97.6	
Informal votes		435	2.4	
Turnout		18,430	95.3	
Nationalist hold		Swing		

=== Elections in the 1920s ===
==== 1927 ====
1927 New South Wales state election: Hornsby
Party	Candidate	Votes	%	±%
Nationalist	James Shand	9,111	75.1	
Labor	Percy Hannett	3,017	24.9	
Total formal votes		12,128	98.4	
Informal votes		200	1.6	
Turnout		12,328	83.8	
Nationalist win		(new seat)		
