= Grant King =

Australian businessman

- Occupations: Engineer; business executive
- Successor: Matt Kean (as chair of Climate Change Authority)
- Board member of: Contact Energy (Chairman 2004–2015); Envestra (Director), Energy Supply Association of Australia (Chairman); HSBC Australia (Chairman 2020–present); Climate Change Authority (Chair)

Grant King is an Australian engineer and business executive. He retired as Managing Director of Origin Energy in October 2016, and in November 2016 became President of the Business Council of Australia. He served as the chair of the Climate Change Authority, preceding the current chair Matt Kean. He was elected a Fellow of the Australian Academy of Technological Sciences & Engineering in 2026.

== Career ==
- prior to 1994 General Manager, AGL Gas Companies
- 1994-2000 Managing Director, Boral Energy
- 2000-2016 Managing Director, Origin Energy
- 2004–2015 Chairman of Contact Energy
- 2016–2019 President of Business Council of Australia (BCA)
- 2020-present Chairman of HSBC Australia

King has also held roles as councillor of the Australian Petroleum Production and Exploration Association, director of Envestra and chairman of the Energy Supply Association of Australia.
