= John Maddison =

Australian politician

The Honourable John Maddison

41st Attorney General of New South Wales
- In office 3 January 1975 – 14 May 1976
- Premier: Thomas Lewis; Sir Eric Willis
- Preceded by: Sir Ken McCaw
- Succeeded by: Frank Walker

Member of the New South Wales Parliament for Ku-ring-gai
- In office 17 November 1973 – 4 July 1980
- Preceded by: New district
- Succeeded by: Nick Greiner

Personal details
- Born: 4 September 1921 Chatswood, New South Wales
- Died: 29 August 1982 (aged 60) Warrawee, New South Wales, Australia
- Party: Liberal Party
- Spouse: Suzanne Berry-Smith

Military service
- Allegiance: Australia
- Branch/service: (Australia) Australian Army
- Years of service: 1942–1946
- Rank: Lieutenant
- Unit: 2nd Australian Imperial Force; 53rd Anti-Aircraft Regiment
- Battles/wars: World War II; Borneo Campaign; Philippines Campaign

John Clarkson Maddison (4 September 1921 – 29 August 1982) was a New South Wales politician, Attorney General, Minister for Justice and Deputy Leader for the Liberal Party of New South Wales in the cabinets of Robert Askin, Tom Lewis and Sir Eric Willis until the Liberal party lost the 1976 election. Maddison was first elected to the New South Wales Legislative Assembly for the Electoral district of Hornsby in 1962 until 1973 and thereon as member for Ku-ring-gai until his retirement in 1980.

== Early life ==
Maddison was born in Chatswood, New South Wales, Australia, in 1921, the son of George Edgar Maddison, a company director from New Zealand, and Frances Mary Maddison (née Patterson). After early education at Sydney Grammar School, Maddison began an arts degree at the University of Sydney but interrupted university studies to enlist upon the outbreak of the Second World War. He later gained his BA in 1942. Maddison was commissioned as a Lieutenant in the 2nd Australian Imperial Force, 53rd Anti-Aircraft Regiment, on 2 August 1942, serving in Borneo and the Philippines.

Being discharged on 22 January 1946, he resumed his studies and gained a Bachelor of Laws (LLB) in 1948. Maddison was admitted as a solicitor in 1948, with Ralph S.B Sillar and Maddison and became a public notary in 1965. He became the vice president of the Constitutional Association of Australia from 1959 until 1964. Maddison married Suzanne Barry-Smith on 14 October 1953 and together had 2 daughters and a son.

== Political career ==
Maddison joined the Liberal Party in 1954, becoming Secretary and president of Pymble branch and a member of the state executive from 1958 until 1962.

Maddison stood for preselection for the Legislative Assembly seat of Hornsby and gained it over the sitting member, Sydney Storey, who later resigned from the party as stood as an Independent Liberal candidate. Despite this, Maddison was elected at the 1962 election with 54.24% of the vote and went on to hold the seat at a further three elections. Following the Liberal Party victory at the 1965 election under Robert Askin, Maddison was appointed a Minister of the Crown as Minister for Justice, a portfolio he held until the Liberals lost government in 1976.

As Minister he was responsible for the establishment of the Privacy Committee of New South Wales Parliament, consumer protection laws, a law reform commission and the appointment of the first NSW Ombudsman. In 1970 Maddison was sent as leader of the Australian delegation to the United Nations conference on prevention of crime in Japan. Following electoral redistribution at the 1973 election, Maddison moved to the new seat of Ku-ring-gai, gaining 77.6% of the vote. In 1971, Maddison was made a Councillor at Macquarie University, a position which he held until 1978.

In 1975, following the retirement of Premier Sir Robert Askin and the election Tom Lewis as his successor. Eric Willis resigned as Deputy Leader and Maddison was elected in his place. Lewis the appointed Maddison as Attorney General on 3 January 1975 and he was admitted to the New South Wales Bar that same year. As Attorney General Maddison represented Australia as deputy leader of the Geneva conference in 1975 and delegate to Australian Constitutional Convention in Hobart in 1976. He remained as Attorney General until the Liberals lost the election to the ALP on 14 May 1976. Maddison held Ku-ring-gai for a further two elections until his retirement in 1980, causing a by-election that was won by future Liberal Premier of New South Wales, Nick Greiner.

In opposition, Sir Eric Willis appointed Maddison as Shadow Minister for Finance and Federal Affairs from 28 May 1976 to 16 December 1977. When Willis resigned as Leader, Maddison announced his intention to contest the vacant leadership against David Arblaster, Peter Coleman and Kevin Rozzoli, thereby resigning as Deputy Leader. However, when Coleman emerged as leader he was made Shadow Minister for Justice, Shadow Minister for Federal Affairs, Shadow Minister for Cultural Activities from 20 December 1977 until 7 October 1978, when Coleman was lost his seat. Maddison the contested the vacant leadership against Jim Cameron and acting Leader John Mason. When Mason emerged successful as the new Leader, Maddison expressed that he was "a little aghast" at the result. Despite this, Mason appointed him as Shadow Attorney General and Shadow Minister for Justice on 2 November 1978. It was to be his last political appointment which he held until his retirement from Parliament on 4 July 1980. On his retirement, he was permitted by Queen Elizabeth II, on the Governor's recommendation, to continue to use the title "The Honourable".

== After parliament ==
Following his retirement, Maddison continued to involve himself in a wide range of community affairs as a member of the Law Foundation of New South Wales, the Returned Services League of Australia, and as the Chairman of directors of the Multiple Sclerosis Society of New South Wales. He died on 29 August 1982.

In June 1993, the New South Wales Government dedicated the new home of the Department of Attorney General and Justice and various courts as the "John Maddison Tower" in recognition of Maddison's contribution to law in New South Wales.

New South Wales Legislative Assembly
Preceded by Sydney Storey	Member for Hornsby; 1962 – 1973	Succeeded by Neil Pickard
New district	Member for Ku-ring-gai; 1973 – 1980	Succeeded by Nick Greiner
Political offices
Preceded by Jack Mannix	Minister for Justice; 1965 – 1976	Succeeded by Ron Mulock
Preceded by Sir Ken McCaw	Attorney General of New South Wales; 1975 – 1976	Succeeded by Frank Walker
Party political offices
Preceded by Eric Willis	Deputy Leader of the New South Wales Liberal Party; 1975 – 1977	Succeeded by John Mason
