= 2024 Hornsby state by-election =

- 19 October 2024

Electoral district of Hornsby in the New South Wales Legislative Assembly
- Registered: 61,257
- Turnout: 50,879 (83.06%) (▼8.95 pp)

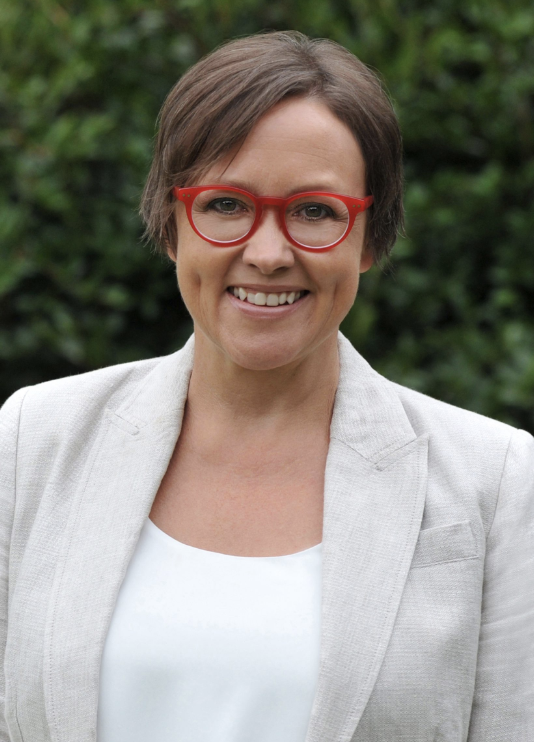
	First party	Second party
Candidate	James Wallace	Tania Salitra
Party	Liberal	Greens
Popular vote	24,578	12,713
Percentage	49.93%	25.83%
Swing	▲6.64	▲11.54
TCP	64.34%	35.66%
MP before election
Matt Kean
Liberal
Elected MP
James Wallace
Liberal

A by-election was held for the New South Wales Legislative Assembly seat of Hornsby on 19 October 2024, following the resignation of Liberal Party MP Matt Kean.

== Background ==
The by-election was triggered by the resignation of Liberal MP Matt Kean, who served as the state party's deputy leader and as the state's Treasurer under Premier Dominic Perrottet. He held many other ministerial roles under both Perrottet and his predecessor, Gladys Berejiklian. Kean is a member of the party's Moderate faction, and during Perrottet's tenure as Premier was regarded as the faction's de facto leader in New South Wales.

Hornsby is a blue-ribbon seat in northern Sydney, and is one of two of the original post-1927 electoral districts to have only ever been held by the Liberal Party, its predecessors or an independent, the other being Vaucluse.

== Key dates ==
- Issue of writ – 27 September 2024
- Close of rolls – 27 September 2024
- Close of nominations – 3 October 2024
- Declaration of nominations – 4 October 2024
- Commencement of early voting – 12 October 2024
- Applications for postal voting closes – 14 October 2024
- Polling day – 19 October 2024
- Last day for the return of the writ – 8 November 2024

== Previous result ==
2023 New South Wales state election: Hornsby
Party	Candidate	Votes	%	±%
Liberal	Matt Kean	23,451	43.3	−11.6
Labor	Melissa Hoile	13,418	24.8	+4.0
Greens	Tania Salitra	7,738	14.3	+3.3
One Nation	Steve Busch	4,298	7.9	+4.5
Liberal Democrats	Jeffrey Grimshaw	2,125	3.9	+3.9
Independent	Benjamin Caswell	1,557	2.9	+2.9
Sustainable Australia	Justin Thomas	918	1.7	+1.7
Independent	Adrian Dignam	661	1.2	+1.2
Total formal votes		54,166	97.6	+0.1
Informal votes		1,308	2.4	−0.1
Turnout		55,474	92.0	+0.2
Two-party-preferred result
Liberal	Matt Kean	26,506	58.0	−8.8
Labor	Melissa Hoile	19,163	42.0	+8.8
Liberal hold		Swing	−8.8	

== Candidates ==
Party	Candidate	Background
Independent	Brendan Clarke	Three-time contestant for the electorate of Berowra for the Science Party and the Fusion Party.
Greens	Tania Salitra	Greens candidate for mayor of Hornsby Shire Council at the 2024 local elections and commercial photographer
Independent	Justin Thomas	Candidate for Hornsby at the 2023 state election and former corporate accountant
Animal Justice	Sheila Millgate	Psychologist
Independent	Benjamin Caswell	Former education and childcare industry worker
Libertarian	Marc Hendrickx	Geologist, author, volunteer firefighter and activist
Liberal	James Wallace	Former president of NSW Young Liberals
One Nation	Steve Busch	Bus driver and former pilot, candidate for One Nation at the 2023 state election.
Independent	Roger Woodward	Accountant and volunteer firefighter

=== Liberal ===
On 3 August 2024, the Liberal Party preselected James Wallace. Wallace's preselection was unsuccessfully contested by former Deputy Mayor of Hornsby Michael Hutchence and barrister Ishita Sethi.

==== Preselection results ====
Party	Candidate	Votes	%	±%
Liberal	James Wallace	123	65.77	
Liberal	Michael Hutchence	36	19.25	
Liberal	Ishita Sethi	28	14.97	
Total formal votes		187	100.00	

=== Labor ===
The governing Labor Party has stated they will not contest this by-election with Premier Chris Minns stating "a swing against us would be a massive distraction".

=== Others ===
On 16 August 2024, One Nation announced their candidate as Steve Busch, who previously stood at the 2023 state election.

The Libertarian Party announced Marc Hendrickx as their candidate on 19 September 2024. The Sustainable Australia Party has preselected Justin Thomas.

== Results ==
2024 Hornsby by-election
Party	Candidate	Votes	%	±%
Liberal	James Wallace	24,578	49.93	+6.64
Greens	Tania Salitra	12,713	25.83	+11.54
One Nation	Steve Busch	2,740	5.57	−2.36
Independent	Brendon Clarke	2,205	4.48	+4.48
Independent	Benjamin Caswell	1,680	3.41	+0.54
Animal Justice	Sheila Milgate	1,616	3.28	+3.28
Libertarian	Marc Hendrickx	1,508	3.06	−0.86
Sustainable Australia	Justin Thomas	1,337	2.72	+1.03
Independent	Roger Woodward	847	1.72	+1.72
Total formal votes		49,224	96.75	−0.89
Informal votes		1,655	3.25	+0.89
Turnout		50,879	83.06	−8.95
Two-candidate-preferred result
Liberal	James Wallace	26,781	64.34	+6.30
Greens	Tania Salitra	14,840	35.66	+35.66
Liberal hold		Swing	N/A	

== See also ==
- Electoral results for the district of Hornsby
- List of New South Wales state by-elections
- 2024 Pittwater state by-election (same day election)
- 2024 Epping state by-election (same day election)
