= 2/19th Battalion (Australia) =

World War II Australian infantry battalion

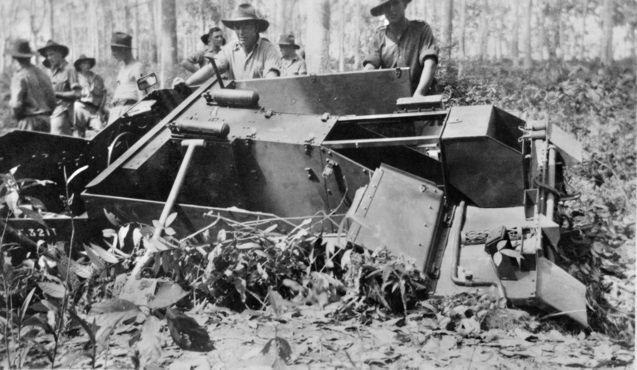
- 2/19th personnel with a bogged Bren Carrier, Malaya, 1941
- Active: 1940–45
- Country: Australia
- Branch: Australian Army
- Type: Infantry
- Size: ~800–900 men (Note: By the start of the Second World War, the authorised strength of an Australian infantry battalion was 910 men all ranks; however, later in the war it fell to 803.)
- Part of: 22nd Brigade, 8th Division
- Colours: Brown over green
- Engagements: Second World War: Malayan campaign; Battle of Singapore

Commanders
- Notable commanders: Charles Anderson

Insignia
- Unit colour patch

The 2/19th Battalion was an infantry battalion of the Australian Army, which was raised for service during the Second World War as part of the Second Australian Imperial Force. After being formed in mid-1940, the battalion was allocated to the 22nd Brigade, which was part of the 8th Division. After completing training in Australia, in early 1941 the 2/19th deployed to Malaya, as part of the Australian force despatched to help bolster the British garrison there as tensions with Japan heightened. Following the commencement of hostilities against Japan, the 2/19th fought several actions in Johore, before withdrawing across the Causeway to Singapore. There, the battalion was involved in the Battle of Singapore in early February 1942, during which it suffered heavy casualties before being captured following the capitulation of the British garrison. The battalion's personnel subsequently spent the next three-and-a-half years as prisoners of war, before being released at the end of the conflict.

== History ==
Raised for service during Second World War as part of the all-volunteer Second Australian Imperial Force (2nd AIF), the 2/19th Battalion (Note: The numerical designation of 2nd AIF units was prefixed by "2/", which was used to set them apart from Militia units.) was formed on 15 July 1940 at Walgrove in Sydney, under the command of Lieutenant Colonel Duncan Maxwell, and was attached to the 22nd Brigade, 8th Division. The majority of the battalion's initial recruits were drawn from regional New South Wales, although some recruits came from Australians living in the Territory of New Guinea, and others came from Sydney. The colours chosen for the battalion's unit colour patch (UCP) were the same as those of the 19th Battalion, a unit which had served during World War I before being raised as a Militia formation in 1921. These colours were brown over green, in a diamond shape, although a border of gray was added to the UCP to distinguish the battalion from its Militia counterpart; this border was formed into an oval shape, designating the battalion as part of the 8th Division.

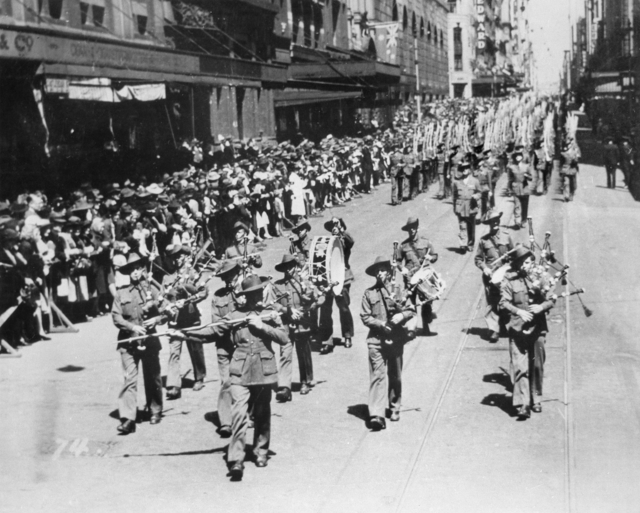
The 2/19th Battalion marching down Castlereagh Street in Sydney on 15 September 1940

Individual and collective training was undertaken at several locations – Walgrove, Ingleburn and Bathurst – as the troops of the newly formed 8th Division were prepared for future employment in the Middle East, where it was planned that they would join the other 2nd AIF divisions that had already been deployed. This had only partially been completed by early 1941, when the Australian government agreed to a British request to dispatch Australian troops to bolster the British garrison in Malaya, amidst growing concerns about a war with Japan in the Pacific. They embarked from Sydney for Singapore aboard the HMT Queen Mary on 2 February 1941, disembarking on 18 February, after which they undertook jungle training in southern Malaya, around Seremban and Port Dickson, until September 1941. They then moved to Jemaluang to build defences on the east coast of the Malayan Peninsula, after a brief stay at Kluang.

Following the landings on 8 December 1941, the battalion was subsequently involved in fighting against the Japanese as part of the Malayan campaign. The first strikes of the Japanese attack fell on British and Indian troops in the north of the country, and initially the Australian units, which were based in primarily in the south around Johore, did not see any fighting during the early stages of the Malayan Campaign. In January 1942, though, as the Japanese advance continued south in to Johore, the battalion moved into action. In early January, one company – 'D' Company – was detached to conduct delaying actions around Endau. A week later, the battalion was dispatched hurriedly to the west coast to help reinforce the 2/29th Battalion, by occupying a vital crossroad position around Bakri. The 2/19th was subsequently involved in heavy fighting against the Japanese during which its commanding officer – Lieutenant Colonel Charles Anderson who had taken over from Maxwell when the latter had been promoted to take over command of the 27th Brigade – earned the Victoria Cross for his actions leading an ad hoc force of Australian and Indian soldiers during the Battle of Muar.

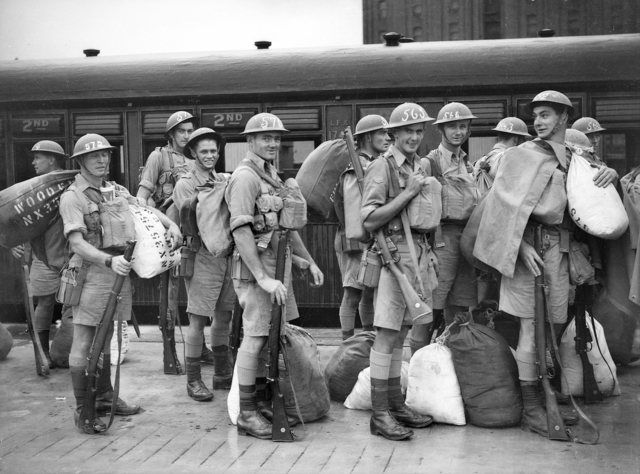
Troops from the 2/19th await embarkation from Sydney on 5 February 1941

Arriving late on 17 January, the 2/19th's arrival helped briefly stabilise the situation on the west coast, allowing the 2/29th and the 45th Indian Brigade to withdraw from Muar. Finding its position being outflanked, the combined Australian-Indian force attempted to withdraw over the bridge at Parit Sulong, fighting their way through several Japanese positions, but found the way blocked at the bridge. With supplies and ammunition running out, and being attacked from the rear by Japanese forces that had pursued them from Bakri, the Australians were forced to leave their wounded behind in the hope that they would receive medical attention from the Japanese, while the remnants of the 2/19th attempted to reach the British lines at Yong Peng, trekking through thick jungle and Japanese lines. The wounded were subsequently murdered by the Japanese in the Parit Sulong massacre; meanwhile, only 271 personnel from the battalion reached Yong Peng. As a result, the battalion saw no further action during the fighting in Malaya. On 26 January 1941, it received a batch of 650 reinforcements, and a hasty training program implemented.

In late January, the battalion withdrew across the Causeway to Singapore as the British Commonwealth forces were pushed off the peninsula. The 2/19th subsequently assumed a defensive position in the western sector of the island. Following the Japanese assault on 8 February, the 2/19th fought a series of desperate actions; during the initial landings, its forward positions, too widely dispersed in countryside that was not ideal for defence, were easily infiltrated by the assaulting Japanese troops and the 2/19th was forced back towards the centre of the island. The unit was later captured on the outskirts of Singapore on 15 February 1942, along with the bulk of British Commonwealth forces after the British commander, Lieutenant General Arthur Percival, ordered the capitulation of the garrison. The men were initially imprisoned at Changi; however, many were later sent to work on the Thai–Burma Railway, while others were sent to prison camps in Borneo, Japan, Taiwan, French Indochina, Java, Sumatra, and Malaya.

Following the surrender of Japan the survivors were liberated in August 1945. The battalion was disbanded later in 1945, having sustained the highest casualties of any Australian Army unit during the war, sustaining 620 dead and 197 wounded. A total of approximately 1,500 men served with the 2/19th Battalion. In addition to the Victoria Cross awarded to Anderson, decorations awarded to members of the 2/19th included: two Military Crosses, two Military Medals, and seven Mentions in Despatches.

== Battle honours ==
The 2/19th Battalion received the following battle honours:

- Malaya 1941–1942; Johore; The Muar; and Singapore Island.

In 1961, these battle honours were entrusted to the 19th Battalion, and they are now maintained by the 1st/19th Battalion, Royal New South Wales Regiment.

== Commanding officers ==
The following officers commanded the 2/19th Battalion during the war:

- Lieutenant Colonel Duncan Maxwell (1940–41);
- Lieutenant Colonel Charles Anderson (1941–42);
- Lieutenant Colonel Andrew Robertson (1942)
