= Edwin Lusher =

Australian judge (1916–2000)

Ted Lusher
- Born: 16 June 1916; Sydney
- Died: 5 January 2000 (aged 83); Sydney
- Education: Newington College; Sydney Grammar School; University of Sydney
- Occupations: Solicitor, barrister, queen's counsel, judge
- Title: The Honourable Edwin Lusher QC
- Spouse: Gloria
- Children: 5 children including Stephen Lusher

The Honourable Edwin Augustus Lusher QC (16 June 1916 – 5 January 2000) was an Australian judge who chaired New South Wales commissions of inquiry into police administration and gambling.

== Early life ==
Ted Lusher was born in Sydney and attended Newington College (1925–1931) and Sydney Grammar School. He went up to the University of Sydney and graduated in law in 1939.

== Legal career ==
Lusher became a barrister practicing in common law and was later appointed Queen's Counsel. In 1976 the government of Neville Wran asked him to report upon the possible legalisation of casinos in NSW. He recommended a closely regulated, small, London-style casino system based on membership. These recommendations were not implemented and in time the Las Vegas model emerged as the preferred option. In 1977 he was appointed a judge of the Supreme Court of New South Wales and he served on that court until his retirement in 1986. Other positions held included serving on the New South Wales Medico-Legal Society and the NSW Bar Association. In 1979 the Wran Government called upon him again to inquire into the administration of the New South Wales Police Force.
