= Climate Change Authority =

Australian federal climate change policy advisory agency

Authority overview
- Formed: 1 July 2012; 14 years ago
- Jurisdiction: Australia
- Headquarters: Canberra, Australian Capital Territory
- Employees: 65 (2024)
- Annual budget: A$17.2 million (2024)
- Minister responsible: Chris Bowen, Minister for Climate Change and Energy
- Authority executives: Matt Kean, Chair; Brad Archer, CEO
- Parent department: Department of Climate Change, Energy, the Environment and Water
- Key document: Climate Change Authority Act 2011
- Website: climatechangeauthority.gov.au

The Climate Change Authority (CCA) is an Australian Government statutory agency responsible for providing advice to government on climate change policy. It was established by and operates under the Climate Change Authority Act 2011, and commenced operations on 1 July 2012. It was set up by the government of Julia Gillard and has withstood concerted efforts to disestablish it. The Abbott government campaigned for the CCA's abolition, having dissolved the Climate Commission.

The Authority is a non-corporate entity without legislative or executive powers, which remain with the Government and Parliament of the day. The Authority's responsibilities include conducting periodic legislative reviews of the Emissions Reduction Fund and the National Greenhouse and Energy Reporting scheme, as well as carrying out special reviews as requested by the Minister responsible for climate change or the Australian Parliament. It may also undertake self-initiated research on matters related to climate change.

Prior to amendments made by the Australian Parliament in 2014 and 2015, the Authority was required to review Australia's greenhouse gas emission caps, the indicative national emissions trajectory and national carbon budget, progress in achieving Australia's emissions reduction targets and national carbon budget, the Renewable Energy Target and the emissions trading scheme, the last of which has been discontinued. Members of the Authority are entitled to write dissenting minority reports, and often do so.

== Membership ==
The Authority has a board comprising a chair and up to eight other permanent members. The original chair of the Authority, former Reserve Bank of Australia Governor and former Federal Treasury Secretary, Bernie Fraser, resigned from the position in 2015. Current members are Matt Kean (chair), Susie Smith, Mark Lewis, John McGee and Russell Reichelt. Australia's Chief Scientist, Cathy Foley serves as an ex officio Authority member. Wendy Craik, a former commissioner of the Productivity Commission and Chief Executive of the Murray-Darling Basin Commission among other executive roles, was appointed Chair of the Authority on 1 May 2016 and served until 19 April 2021.

Former members have included Clive Hamilton, Heather Ridout, Ian Chubb, Kate Carnell and John Quiggin. In June 2024, the Albanese government announced that former New South Wales treasurer and energy minister, Matt Kean, would be the new chair of the Authority, effective from 1 August.

== Publications ==
The Authority has published a total of 23 reports since it was established in 2012. This includes reviews of:

- the National Greenhouse and Energy Reporting legislation
- the National Windfarm Commissioner
- the Emissions Reduction Fund
- the power sector (with the Australian Energy Market Commission)
- policies to meet Australia's emissions reduction targets under the Paris Agreement.

In 2013 a report investigating emissions targets concluded Australia's target was inadequate and not credible. The CCA produced a key review in 2014. It set out the targets Australia needed to follow to help limit global warming to less than 2°C. In 2016, the body released a report calling for the government of Australia to introduce an emissions trading scheme.

The Authority published three reports in 2020. The first report, Prospering in a low emissions world, sets out recommendations for how Australia can reduce its greenhouse gas emissions in order to meet its 2030 Nationally Determined Contribution under the Paris Agreement as well as subsequent, more ambitious targets, and prosper in a world transitioning to net zero emissions. The second report, Economic recovery, resilience and prosperity after the coronavirus, identifies measures previously proposed by the Authority that could contribute to a "triple-win" stimulus package in response to the economic impacts of the COVID-19 pandemic. The third report, a statutory review of the Emissions Reduction Fund, examines its performance and makes 23 recommendations aimed at increasing the Emissions Reduction Fund's contribution to reducing Australia's emissions, improving the operation of the scheme and enhancing governance arrangements and proactively managing risk, including climate risk.

In 2024 the Authority released a report examining emissions reduction in certain sectors of the economy such as agriculture.

== See also ==
- Climate change in Australia
- Electricity sector in Australia
- List of Australian Government entities
- Renewable energy in Australia
