= Division of Hume =

Australian federal electoral division

Hume Australian House of Representatives Division
- Interactive map of electorate boundaries from the 2025 federal election
- Created: 1901
- MP: Angus Taylor
- Party: Liberal
- Namesake: Hamilton Hume
- Electors: 117,488 (2025)
- Area: 2,674 km^{2} (1,032.4 sq mi)
- Demographic: Outer metropolitan
- Coordinates: 34°03′16″S 150°41′45″E
Electorates around Hume:
Calare	Macquarie	Lindsay; Werriwa
Calare	Hume	Macarthur
Riverina	Whitlam	Cunningham

The Division of Hume is an Australian electoral division in the state of New South Wales. It lies on the outskirts of southwestern Sydney, encompassing towns such as Bargo, Picton, Tahmoor, as well as most of Lake Burragorang in the Greater Blue Mountains Area in the west.

The current Member of Parliament (MP) for Hume has been Angus Taylor since the 2013 federal election, who has also been Leader of the Liberal Party and Leader of the Opposition since 2026.

== History ==
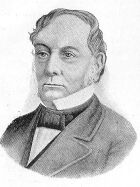
Hamilton Hume, the division's namesake

The division was proclaimed in 1900, and was one of the original 65 divisions to be contested at the first federal election. The division was named after Hamilton Hume, one of the first Europeans to travel through the area.

When the division was proclaimed, the division partially overlapped with the New South Wales Legislative Assembly electoral district of the same name. The member for the colonial electoral district at the time, William Lyne of the Protectionist Party, was also the Premier of the colony. He resigned as Premier and from the Legislative Assembly to contest the federal seat at the first federal election in 1901, subsequently winning the seat at the election and becoming the first member for the federal seat.

After election, Lyne served as a cabinet minister in various roles (except when the Protectionist Party was not in government between 1904 and 1905). He served as a minister until 1908 when the Deakin government lost support in parliament. In 1909, the Protectionist Party and Anti-Socialist Party merged to form the Liberal Party (not to be confused with the modern Liberal Party), but Lyne refused to join the merged party and sat as an independent. He was re-elected as an independent at the 1910 election, when Labor won and formed majority government. However, at the 1913 election, Lyne was defeated by the Liberal Party's Robert Patten. Patten would serve as the member for Hume for two terms, during which, the Liberal Party merged with the National Labor Party to become the Nationalist Party.

Patten retired at the 1917 election, and he was succeeded by Franc Falkiner, also from the Nationalist Party. Falkiner had transferred from the neighbouring Division of Riverina. He did not recontest Hume at the following 1919 election, and the division was won by Labor's Parker Moloney, becoming the first Labor member of Hume. Moloney had relocated from Victoria and had transferred from the adjacent federal Victorian division of Division of Indi. In 1931, Moloney was defeated by Thomas Collins of the Country Party (later National Party), who also became the first Country member for Hume.

For the next 40 years, the division of Hume regularly changed hands between the Country and Labor parties, with all sitting members during this period defeated in general elections. In particular, the division alternated between Labor's Arthur Fuller and Country's Charles Anderson for twenty years between 1943 and 1963. Labor last won the seat at the 1972 election, with Frank Olley being the most recent Labor member for Hume (as of 2026). He was defeated by Country Party member Stephen Lusher at the following 1974 election.

At the 1984 election, the Liberal Party member for Farrer, Wal Fife, contested Hume after a redistribution transferred Wagga Wagga from Farrer to Hume. This created a three-cornered contest between Lusher, Fife and the Labor candidate, splitting the conservative vote. Out of the three, Lusher had the lowest primary vote count which was narrowly behind Fife's. The preferences for Lusher were mostly distributed to Fife, and Fife won the seat to become the first member for Hume from the current Liberal Party.

Fife held the seat until his retirement at the 1993 election, when National regained the seat with the election of John Sharp. Sharp had transferred from the Division of Gilmore, which lost majority of its area to Hume following a redistribution. Sharp was involved in a parliamentary travel allowances affair in 1997 and retired at the 1998 election. In the election, Liberal Party regained the seat with the election of Alby Schultz, who was previously the state member for Burrinjuck. Since that election, the division of Hume had only been won by the Liberal Party.

Since the 2013 federal election, the member for Hume is Angus Taylor of the Liberal Party, who became party leader and opposition leader in 2026.

== Boundaries ==
Since 1984, federal electoral division boundaries in Australia have been determined at redistributions by a redistribution committee appointed by the Australian Electoral Commission. Redistributions occur for the boundaries of divisions in a particular state, and they occur every seven years, or sooner if a state's representation entitlement changes or when divisions of a state are malapportioned.

When the division was created in 1900, it was located in southern NSW on the Victorian border and encompassed the town of Albury. In the 1906 redistribution, it lost Cootamundra to the Division of Werriwa but gained Wagga Wagga from the abolished Division of Bland. It regained Cootamundra in the 1913 redistribution. Until 1949, the division had largely covered similar areas, occasionally gaining small areas to the east in redistributions, such as Yass. It began to border the Australian Capital Territory in 1934.

The first major change to the division's boundaries was in 1949, when it lost its western half comprising Wagga Wagga and Albury to the new Division of Farrer. However, it gained some areas further to the north-west and north-east in the surroundings of Cootamundra and Yass. By 1968, the division had already expanded north to include the areas south of Orange (but excluding Orange), such as Cowra. It expanded further north in 1977 and gained areas from the Division of Calare, such as Forbes, but stopping short of Parkes.

In 1984, the division lost its northern half (such as Cowra), as well as majority of the areas it had gained in 1977 (such as Forbes), to the new divisions of Parkes and Gilmore. It also regained Wagga Wagga in the south-west from Farrer, only to lose it eight years later in 1992 to the re-created Division of Riverina. In that same year, the division shifted east and was expanded to cover what was previously a large part of Gilmore. These included areas that was previously lost to Gilmore in 1984 such as Cowra and Boorowa, as well as additional areas in the Southern Highlands such as Goulburn. In 2000, the division shifted further east and lost Cootamundra which it covered since federation (except between 1906 and 1913) to Riverina. Instead, it gained further areas in the Southern Highlands from the Division of Macarthur, such as Picton, Appin, Mittagong and Bowral, but did not cover the nearby Moss Vale. In 2006, it lost Picton and Appin but gained Moss Vale.

In 2009, the division lost Mittagong, Bowral and Moss Vale to the Division of Throsby, but regained Picton. It also regained areas to the north-west and south-west, including Cootamundra and Cowra. In 2016, it lost its western one-third of its area including Yass and Cootamundra. Instead, it only gained very small areas in its north-east, regaining Appin and expanding into Camden in the outskirts of Sydney. It also no longer bordered the Australian Capital Territory.

In the 2024 redistribution, the division underwent another major boundary change. It was significantly shrunk in area and lost at least three-quarters of its area in the south-west, including Goulburn and Boorowa, to the divisions of Eden-Monaro, Riverina and Whitlam. It retained only the areas surrounding Bargo, Picton, Appin and Camden. It also expanded slightly to cover more south-western Sydney suburbs, including Oran Park, Leppington, Bradfield, Badgerys Creek and the under-construction Western Sydney Airport at the time.

Between the 2009 and 2024 redistributions, the seat had shrunk from 33,637 km^{2} (12,987 sq mi) to 2,674 km^{2} (1,032 sq mi), an approximately 92% decrease.

Since the 2025 federal election, the division is located in the outer south-west Sydney suburbs and some nearby rural areas. It includes Wollondilly Shire, most of Camden Council, the western part of the City of Liverpool and a southern part of the City of Penrith. The division shares most of its boundaries outside of Sydney with the western, southern and most of the eastern boundaries of Wollondilly Shire.

By 2016, it had moved clear of its original boundaries at federation, as the division had effectively moved north-east towards Sydney gradually over time. Similarly, there is also no overlap between the current area (as of 2025) with any of the division's areas before 2000. Despite this, it has retained the name of Hume, since the AEC's guidelines require it to preserve the names of original Federation divisions where possible.

Redistribution	Map	Interactive	Elections	Notes
1900			1901	
1984; 11 October			1984; 1987; 1990	
1992; 31 January			1993; 1996; 1998	
2000; 31 January			2001; 2004	
2006			2007	
2009			2010; 2013	
2016; 25 February			2016; 2019; 2022	
2024; 10 October			2025	

== Members ==
Image	Member	Party	Term	Notes
	Sir William Lyne (1844–1913)	Protectionist	29 March 1901 – 26 May 1909	Previously held the New South Wales Legislative Assembly seat of Hume. Previously served as the Premier of New South Wales from 1899 to 1901. Served as minister under Barton and Deakin. Lost seat
	Sir William Lyne (1844–1913)	Independent	26 May 1909 – 31 May 1913	Previously held the New South Wales Legislative Assembly seat of Hume. Previously served as the Premier of New South Wales from 1899 to 1901. Served as minister under Barton and Deakin. Lost seat
	Robert Patten (1859–1940)	Liberal	31 May 1913 – 17 February 1917	Retired
	Robert Patten (1859–1940)	Nationalist	17 February 1917 – 26 March 1917	Retired
	Franc Falkiner (1867–1929)	Nationalist	5 May 1917 – 3 November 1919	Previously held the Division of Riverina. Did not contest in 1919. Failed to win a Senate seat
	Parker Moloney (1879–1961)	Labor	13 December 1919 – 19 December 1931	Previously held the Division of Indi. Served as minister under Scullin. Lost seat
	Thomas Collins (1884–1945)	Country	19 December 1931 – 21 August 1943	Served as minister under Menzies and Fadden. Lost seat
	Arthur Fuller (1893–1987)	Labor	21 August 1943 – 10 December 1949	Served as Chief Government Whip in the House under Chifley. Lost seat
	Charles Anderson (1897–1988)	Country	10 December 1949 – 28 April 1951	Lost seat
	Arthur Fuller (1893–1987)	Labor	28 April 1951 – 10 December 1955	Lost seat
	Charles Anderson (1897–1988)	Country	10 December 1955 – 9 December 1961	Lost seat
	Arthur Fuller (1893–1987)	Labor	9 December 1961 – 30 November 1963	Lost seat
	Ian Pettitt (1910–1977)	Country	30 November 1963 – 2 December 1972	Lost seat
	Frank Olley (1927–1988)	Labor	2 December 1972 – 18 May 1974	Lost seat
	Stephen Lusher (1945–)	Country	18 May 1974 – 2 May 1975	Lost seat
	Stephen Lusher (1945–)	National Country	2 May 1975 – 16 October 1982	Lost seat
	Stephen Lusher (1945–)	Nationals	16 October 1982 – 1 December 1984	Lost seat
	Wal Fife (1929–2017)	Liberal	1 December 1984 – 8 February 1993	Previously held the Division of Farrer. Retired
	John Sharp (1954–)	Nationals	13 March 1993 – 31 August 1998	Previously held the Division of Gilmore. Served as minister under Howard. Retired
	Alby Schultz (1939–2015)	Liberal	3 October 1998 – 5 August 2013	Previously held the New South Wales Legislative Assembly seat of Burrinjuck. Retired
	Angus Taylor (1966–)	Liberal	7 September 2013 – present	Served as minister under Turnbull and Morrison. Incumbent. Currently the Leader of the Opposition

== Election results ==
2025 Australian federal election: Hume
Party	Candidate	Votes	%	±%
Liberal	Angus Taylor	43,615	43.85	+1.32
Labor	Thomas Huang	27,073	27.22	+3.07
Greens	Steve Bruce	8,455	8.50	+2.85
One Nation	Helen Ducker	7,967	8.01	+0.07
Independent	Peter McLean	4,435	4.46	+4.46
Trumpet of Patriots	Troy Wozniak	3,472	3.49	+3.49
Family First	Bryan Seidel	2,721	2.74	+2.74
Libertarian	Adrian Rees	1,729	1.74	+0.62
Total formal votes		99,467	91.09	−1.63
Informal votes		9,729	8.91	+1.63
Turnout		109,196	92.97	+7.86
Two-party-preferred result
Liberal	Angus Taylor	57,747	58.06	+1.19
Labor	Thomas Huang	41,720	41.94	−1.19
Liberal hold		Swing	+1.19	
