= Wallgrove Army Base =

Australian army camp and base

Coordinates: 33°48′15″S 150°50′56″E

Wallgrove Army Base was an Australian Army camp and base at Wallgrove, (renamed Eastern Creek), New South Wales, Australia.

The camp was utilised as a staging and training area during World War II.

After World War II, the camp was utilised as an army wireless chain and as a migrant hostel.

Wallgrove Army Base was on the site of the now defunct amusement park called Wonderland Sydney. The site has recently been redeveloped to build an industrial park. Eastern Creek Raceway, the M4 Motorway and the M7 Motorway have also been built on or near the site.

== Australian Army units based at the Wallgrove Army Base ==
- 21st Light Horse Regiment – 1940
- 2/19th Battalion – July 1940
- 3rd Infantry Battalion – December 1940
- 9th Australian Division – February 1943
- 53rd Anti-Aircraft (Composite) Regiment – August 1943
- 2/25th Australian Infantry Battalion – April 1944
- 2/31st Australian Infantry Battalion – April 1944
- 6th Machine Gun Battalion

Post-war, the 176 Air Dispatch Company was based there. 5 Signal Regt. 610 Sig troop transmitting station 1960?–1977 then RAAF
