= Franc Falkiner =

Australian politician and sheep breeder

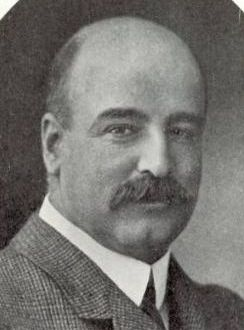

Member of the Australian Parliament for Riverina
- In office 31 May 1913 – 5 September 1914
- Preceded by: John Chanter
- Succeeded by: John Chanter

Member of the Australian Parliament for Hume
- In office 5 May 1917 – 3 November 1919
- Preceded by: Robert Patten
- Succeeded by: Parker Moloney

Personal details
- Born: 17 June 1867 Ararat, Victoria
- Died: 30 October 1929 (aged 62) Bungendore, New South Wales
- Party: Liberal (1913–17); Nationalist (1917–19)
- Spouse: Ethel Elizabeth Howat
- Occupation: Property manager

Franc Brereton Sadleir Falkiner (17 June 1867 – 30 October 1929) was an Australian politician and grazier, born on the Ararat, Victoria goldfields to Frank Sadleir Falkiner and Emily Elizabeth, née Bazley. The eldest boy among five sons and five daughters, his younger brother Otway Rothwell Falkiner would later rival him as a Merino sheep breeder.

Falkiner was educated at Geelong Church of England Grammar School, and in 1878 the family moved to the Riverina as a result of Otway's asthma. Franc managed the family properties for some time, and in 1909 became managing director of F. S. Falkiner & Sons Ltd on the death of his father.

A founding member of Conargo Shire Council (formed in 1906), Falkiner's political interests were awakened by the 1910 Federal land tax, which prompted him to enter the Australian House of Representatives. He won the seat of Riverina in 1913, representing the Commonwealth Liberal Party, but lost it to the former member, John Chanter, the following year. He won Hume in 1917 for the Nationalist Party, but was defeated in his attempt to transfer to the Senate in 1919. A brusque and humorous politician, Falkiner derided Labor Prime Minister Andrew Fisher's 1912 maternity allowance as a "bangle bonus".

On his departure from politics, Falkiner concentrated on breeding sheep, and was president of the Southern Riverina Pastoralists' Union, one of the founders of the Australian Stud Merino Flock Register, and a director of the Bank of New South Wales from 1919–1929.

Falkiner died on 30 October 1929 at Foxlow Station, Bungendore of intracranial haemorrhage, and was survived by his wife, Ethel Elizabeth (née Howat), whom he had married on 5 May 1902, and his two sons and two daughters.

Parliament of Australia
Preceded by John Chanter	Member for Riverina; 1913–1914	Succeeded by John Chanter
Preceded by Robert Patten	Member for Hume; 1917–1919	Succeeded by Parker Moloney
