= Robert Patten (Australian politician) =

Australian politician

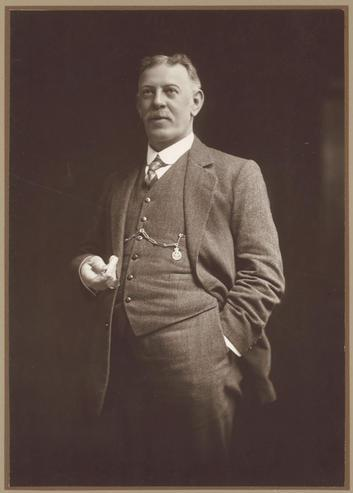

Member of the Australian Parliament for Hume
- In office 31 May 1913 – 26 March 1917
- Preceded by: William Lyne
- Succeeded by: Franc Falkiner

Personal details
- Born: 18 January 1859 Brixton, London, England
- Died: 17 September 1940 (aged 81) Geelong, Victoria, Australia
- Party: Commonwealth Liberal Party
- Occupation: Farmer

Robert Patten (18 January 1859 – 17 September 1940) was an English-born Australian politician. He was a member of the New South Wales Legislative Council from 1908 to 1910 and a Commonwealth Liberal Party member of the Australian House of Representatives for the electorate of Hume from 1913 to 1917.

Born in Brixton, London, Patten migrated to Australia while a teenager. He became a teacher from 1883 in a succession of rural New South Wales schools, first at Ournie temporarily, then at Menindee, then headmaster at Wallaroo from 1885 to 1891, and finally at Bolwarra (near Maitland) from 1891 to 1897. He then became a farmer at Comobella (near Wellington. He joined the Farmers and Settlers Association in 1902 and rose through its ranks from Comobella branch chairman, to its executive council in 1904, and then serving as its president from 1908 to 1913. He also served as president of the Cobbora Shire in 1908.

Patten was appointed to the New South Wales Legislative Council by the Wade government in 1908. He resigned from the Legislative Council in 1910 in an unsuccessful attempt to contest the 1910 federal election in the seat of Gwydir, which was followed by an unsuccessful candidacy for Liverpool Plains at the 1910 state election.

In 1913, he was elected to the Australian House of Representatives as a member of the Commonwealth Liberal Party, defeating former New South Wales Premier William Lyne, running as an independent, for the seat of Hume. Though initially seen as being largely a candidate elected in the "country interests" alongside his Liberal endorsement, he was harshly criticised by The Farmer and Settler newspaper towards the end of his association term for being too closely aligned with Liberal instead of country interests. He held the seat until he retired in 1917.

In May 1917, he was appointed as a manager by the Commonwealth Government to the London staff of the Australian Munitions and War Workers. He relocated to Victoria c. 1928 and lived at Barwon Heads from c. 1932. He died at Geelong in 1940 and was buried at Geelong's Eastern Cemetery.

Parliament of Australia
Preceded by William Lyne	Member for Hume; 1913–1917	Succeeded by Franc Falkiner
