= Neil Pickard =

Australian politician

The Honourable Neil Pickard
- Pickard in 1980

Agent-General for New South Wales
- In office 16 September 1991 – 4 March 1993
- Preceded by: Norman Brunsdon
- Succeeded by: Stephen Cartwright (2021)

Minister for Education
- In office 23 January 1976 – 14 May 1976
- Premier: Sir Eric Willis
- Preceded by: Sir Eric Willis
- Succeeded by: Eric Bedford

Member of the New South Wales Parliament for Hornsby
- In office 17 November 1973 – 3 May 1991
- Preceded by: John Maddison
- Succeeded by: Seat abolished

Personal details
- Born: 13 February 1929 Strathfield, New South Wales, Australia
- Died: 13 April 2007 (aged 78) Turramurra, New South Wales, Australia
- Party: Liberal Party
- Occupation: Politician
- Profession: Teacher

Neil Edward William Pickard (13 February 1929 – 13 April 2007) was a New South Wales politician and Minister of the Crown in the cabinets of Sir Eric Willis and Nick Greiner. He was a member of the New South Wales Legislative Assembly for 26 years from 17 November 1973 to 3 May 1991 for the Liberal Party until his retirement from politics upon the abolition of his seat at the election. He was appointed NSW Agent-General in London, but was recalled soon after due to expenses abuse.

== Early life ==
Pickard was born in Strathfield in Sydney, the son of Edward Pickard and Mary MacGilvray. Having left school at age 12 to support his family, Pickard gained a place to study at the Methodist Leigh College in 1951, and was educated at the University of Sydney, Wesley College, where he gained a Bachelor of Arts (BA), a Master of Education (MEd), a Diploma of Education (DipEd) and later at the University of Melbourne he gained a Licentiate in Theology (LTh) and a Diploma in Theology (DipTh).

He moved to Peak Hill to serve as a Methodist Minister from 1952 to 1965. He entered politics when he was elected as became an Alderman of the Peak Hill Shire Council and it was there also that he joined the Liberal Party: "to me the Liberal Party was the party that offered the greatest freedom on a grass roots level". In 1965 he became an English and History teacher at Dubbo High School. In 1969 he was also elected an Alderman of Dubbo City Council, becoming Chairman of the Country Mayors Association. Pickard also became Western Regional chairman and a member of the State Executive of the Liberal Party. In May 1971, Pickard was asked by Prime Minister William McMahon to be part of the education sub-committee of the joint standing committee on Federal Policy, to examine Liberal education policy.

== Political career ==
In 1973, while teaching at Sydney University, Pickard was approached by the Premier of New South Wales, Sir Robert Askin and offered the nomination for the vacant Liberal preselection of the seat of Hornsby, when the sitting member, John Maddison, chose to contest the new seat of Ku-ring-gai. He accepted and was subsequently elected at the 1973 election with 59.97% of the vote.

During the Askin and Lewis Governments he remained on the backbenches. However, following the poor performance of Premier Lewis, despite a comprehensive Coalition victory at the 1975 federal election, Pickard, along with fellow backbenchers David Arblaster (Mosman) and Keith Doyle (Vaucluse), all of whom had supported Sir Eric Willis in previous ballots, moved against Premier Lewis. At the party room meeting on 20 January 1976, Pickard called a spill motion which carried 22 votes to 11. Lewis did not recontest, leaving Willis to take the leadership unopposed. Willis then appointed Pickard on 23 January 1976 to the cabinet as Minister for Education, which he held until the Coalition government lost the 1976 election on 14 May 1976. At the March election he retained his seat with a significant margin of 61.56%. In Opposition, he was appointed as Shadow Minister for Education under Willis and then Peter Coleman from 28 May 1976 to 7 October 1978. At the 1978 'Wranslide' election he came close to defeat within his own electorate, surviving by only 562 votes and 50.85% of the vote.

When Coleman lost his seat at the election, the new leader, John M. Mason, made Pickard Shadow Minister for Mineral Resources; Pickard occupied this post from 2 November 1978 to 11 July 1980. He was thereafter made Shadow Minister for Energy, a title he held from 11 July 1980 to 12 October 1981. Once John Dowd became leader, Pickard was dropped from the opposition frontbench. However, upon the election of Nick Greiner as leader, he returned as Shadow Minister for Education from 8 April 1983 to 18 February 1986, when he was appointed on 15 May as Shadow Minister for Mineral Resources. Pickard was suspended for two days from parliament after losing his customarily cool temper during a rowdy session in the Legislative Assembly on 27 October 1987. Pickard, who had been upset by Labor MPs laughing during a speech by Greiner, got up and pointed at Premier Barrie Unsworth: "It's all right for you, you giggling Gert. That's all you can do is smile, you mock yourself if you can smile at all. Get your cardigan on and come out into the street and fight." Unsworth declined the invitation and the Speaker, Laurie Kelly, had Pickard expelled.

Once Unsworth had lost in a landslide to the Greiner-led coalition at the 1988 election, Pickard was appointed as Minister for Mineral Resources and Energy in the new government. In this capacity Pickard came under fire for not declaring pecuniary interests which amounted to shares in two mining companies, for nine months, and taking a further three weeks to clear up the matter. Pickard generated international interest when he announced to Parliament a plan to use seized marijuana crops as a cheaper alternative for coal, the plan was met with uproarious laughter from both sides. He held office until 1991 when his seat of Hornsby was abolished, and he subsequently retired from politics.

== After politics ==
Following his departure from parliament, Pickard was appointed by the Premier as the Agent-General for New South Wales in London. However, following allegations that he had abused his expenses while in that office, the new Premier John Fahey abolished the office of Agent-General in 1992 and Pickard was recalled in March 1993. Pickard contested the decision over a breach of contract and later won a dispute over compensation, although he never again took part in political life.

New South Wales Legislative Assembly
Preceded by John Maddison	Member for Hornsby; 1973 – 1991	District abolished
Political offices
Preceded by Eric Willis	Minister for Education; 1976	Succeeded by Eric Bedford
Preceded by Ken Gabb	Minister for Mineral Resources; 1988	Succeeded by Himself as Minister for Minerals and Energy
Preceded by Ken Gabb	Minister for Energy; 1988	Succeeded by Himself as Minister for Minerals and Energy
Preceded by Himself	Minister for Minerals and Energy; 1988 – 1991	Succeeded by Ian Causley as Minister for Natural Resources
Preceded by Himself	Minister for Minerals and Energy; 1988 – 1991	Succeeded by Robert Webster as Minister for Energy
Diplomatic posts
Preceded by Norman Brunsdon	Agent-General for New South Wales; 1991 – 1993	Vacant Title next held by Stephen Cartwright
