= Matt Kean =

Australian politician (born 1981)

The Honourable Matt Kean
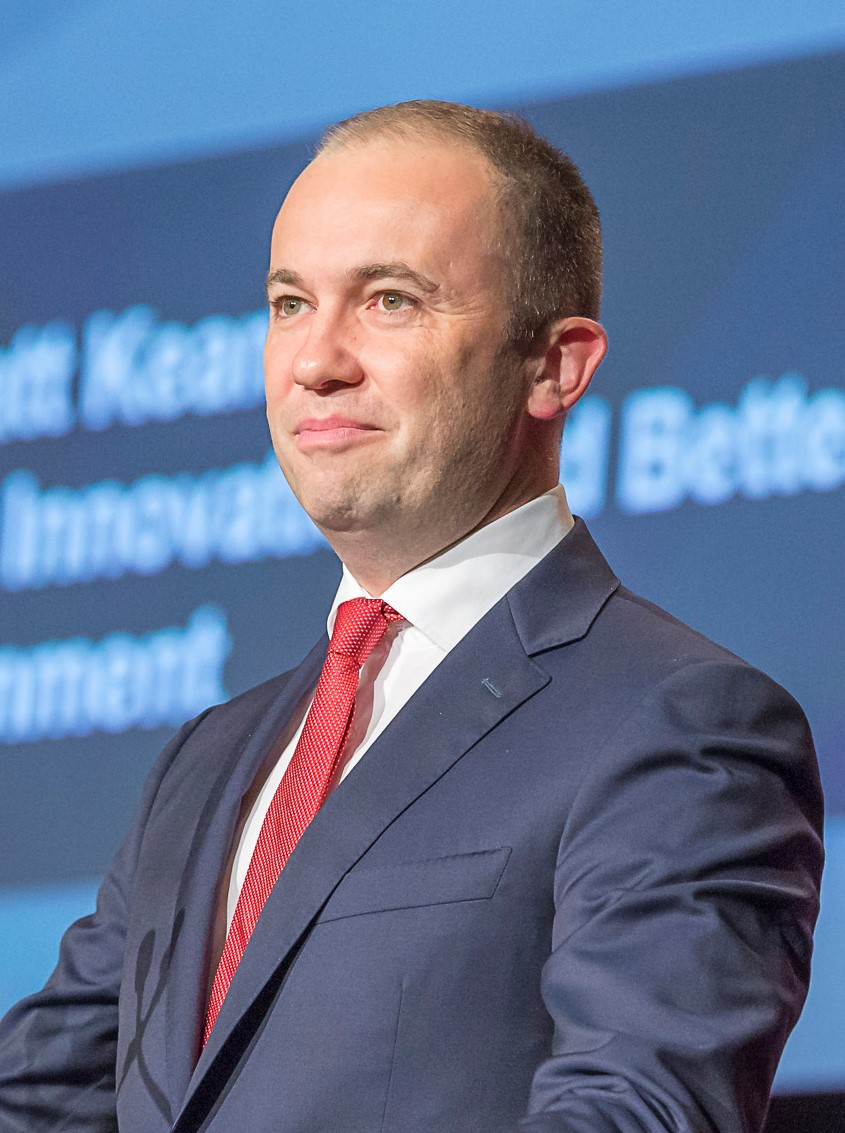
- Kean in 2017

Chair of the Climate Change Authority
- Incumbent
- Assumed office 1 August 2024
- Appointed by: Anthony Albanese
- Preceded by: Grant King
NSW Minister 2017–2023
66th Treasurer of New South Wales
In office 5 October 2021 – 28 March 2023
Premier	Dominic Perrottet
Preceded by	Dominic Perrottet
Succeeded by	Daniel Mookhey
Minister for Energy
In office 21 December 2021 – 28 March 2023
Premier	Dominic Perrottet
Preceded by	Himself (as Minister for Energy and Environment)
Succeeded by	Penny Sharpe
Minister for Energy and Environment
In office 2 April 2019 – 21 December 2021
Premier	Gladys Berejiklian; Dominic Perrottet
Preceded by	Don Harwin (as Minister for Energy and Utilities); Gabrielle Upton (as Minister for Environment)
Succeeded by	Himself (as Minister for Energy); James Griffin (as Minister for Environment and Heritage)
Minister for Innovation and Better Regulation
In office 30 January 2017 – 2 April 2019
Premier	Gladys Berejiklian
Preceded by	Victor Dominello
Succeeded by	Kevin Anderson

Deputy Leader of the New South Wales Liberal Party
- In office 9 August 2022 – 26 March 2023
- Leader: Dominic Perrottet
- Preceded by: Stuart Ayres
- Succeeded by: Natalie Ward

Member of the New South Wales Legislative Assembly for Hornsby
- In office 26 March 2011 – 2 August 2024
- Preceded by: Judy Hopwood
- Succeeded by: James Wallace

Personal details
- Born: 16 September 1981 (age 45) Wahroonga, New South Wales, Australia
- Party: Liberal
- Education: Saint Ignatius' College, Riverview
- Alma mater: University of Technology Sydney
- Occupation: Politician

Matthew John Kean (born 16 September 1981) is a former Australian politician who is the Chair of the Climate Change Authority. Prior to this, he was the Treasurer of New South Wales in the second Perrottet ministry of New South Wales between October 2021 and March 2023. He was also the Minister for Energy between April 2019 and March 2023 and was also the Deputy Leader of the New South Wales Liberal Party from August 2022 until March 2023. He represented Hornsby for the party in the New South Wales Legislative Assembly from 2011 to 2024.

Kean previously served as the Minister for Innovation and Better Regulation from January 2017 until March 2019 in the first Berejiklian ministry and as the Minister for Environment from April 2019 until December 2021 in the second Berejiklian ministry.

== Early years and background ==
Kean grew up in the Berowra area and was educated at Saint Ignatius' College, Riverview before attaining a Bachelor of Business from the University of Technology, Sydney. He later completed a graduate diploma at the Institute of Chartered Accountants. While at university, he was elected to the UTS Student Representative Council and as the SRC Executive Member for the Haymarket Campus. Kean has been a member of the Liberal Party since 2001, and in 2008, he was elected vice-president of the NSW Young Liberals. During the 2003 State election campaign, Kean worked as an adviser for the Leader of the Opposition, John Brogden. He subsequently worked for Catherine Cusack MLC as an adviser while she was shadow minister for Juvenile Justice and Women.

Prior to entering Parliament, Kean was briefly an accountant at PricewaterhouseCoopers.

== Political career ==
Following announcement of the retirement of the sitting member, Judy Hopwood, Kean contested pre-selection for the safe Liberal seat against Hornsby Mayor, Nick Berman, and Hornsby Councillor, Steve Russell. Kean won endorsement and Berman announced his decision to resign from the Liberal Party and run against Kean as an independent candidate at the 2011 State election. At the election, Kean was elected; however, the party suffered a swing of 3.5 points. Kean won the seat with 62.1 per cent of the two-party vote, with Berman being his main rival.

Kean used his inaugural speech to call on the government to spend as much money on suicide prevention campaigns as it does on road safety campaigns. His call for the $10 million campaign received support from Professor Ian Hickey and the Minister for Mental Health Kevin Humphries. He has hosted an annual Youth Forum in conjunction with Black Dog institute that aimed at educating students and teachers about issues relating to mental health; and has successfully campaigned for the construction of a new mental health inpatient facility in Hornsby.

Following the resignation of Mike Baird as Premier, Gladys Berejiklian was elected as Liberal leader and sworn in as Premier. The Berejiklian ministry was subsequently formed, with Kean sworn in as the Minister for Innovation and Better Regulation, with effect from 30 January 2017. Following the 2019 state election, Kean was appointed as the Minister for Energy and Environment in the second Berejiklian ministry, with effect from 2 April 2019. Kean became embroiled in controversy soon after his appointment. In one of his first acts as Energy Minister, Kean appointed former Prime Minister Malcolm Turnbull inaugural chair of the government's net zero emissions advisory board. One week later Kean sacked Turnbull from the role, with Turnbull claiming Kean was pressured by right-wing media to do so.

Kean was involved in a sexting scandal in February 2018, texting Liberal MP Eleni Petinos to seek sexual intercourse while at the same time involved in a relationship with an adviser in Prime Minister Malcolm Turnbull's office, Caitlin Keage. Keage subsequently shared the illicit text messages with the media, describing it as predatory behaviour by Kean. NSW Premier Gladys Berejiklian described Kean's conduct as extremely disappointing and Kean apologised in a media statement. This followed an earlier relationship scandal involving Kean in 2016, when a former partner said on Facebook, then retracted, that Kean had been "screwing" one of Turnbull's advisers.

Kean was sued for defamation by car dealer Bevin Clayton, who alleged Kean falsely described him as dishonest and untrustworthy in social media posts.

Following the resignation of Berejiklian, Dominic Perrottet was elected as leader of the Liberal Party of New South Wales and sworn in as Premier. Kean was selected by Perrottet to succeed him as Treasurer of New South Wales, and was sworn in on 5 October 2021. In a December 2021 rearrangement of the Perrottet ministry, Kean was appointed as Minister for Energy, and retained the portfolio of Treasurer.

Kean has said that NSW, which as of 2021 generated 70% of its electricity from coal, can stop using coal-fired power by 2030, but environmental activists point to the continued approval of new coal mines in NSW as making this unlikely, and have argued that NSW will struggle to reach its target of net zero emissions by 2050.

Kean has been described as a moderate Liberal, and is considered to be the leader of the moderate faction of the New South Wales Liberals.

On 18 June 2024 Kean announced his intention to resign from the New South Wales Parliament and announced he would be moving to the private sector energy industry; Kean's resignation triggered a by-election in Kean's Hornsby seat in state parliament.

== Post-political career ==
On 24 June 2024 Kean was appointed chair of the Climate Change Authority by Prime Minister Anthony Albanese, working to provide advice to the Australian federal government about climate policy.

Since becoming the chair of the Climate Change Authority Kean has publicly admitted that he is a skeptic of nuclear power generation, which the federal opposition Coalition advocated for under the leadership of Peter Dutton.

In August 2024, Kean joined the climate investment company Wollemi Capital to work in a senior role.

== See also ==
- First Berejiklian ministry
- Second Berejiklian ministry
- First Perrottet ministry
- Second Perrottet ministry

New South Wales Legislative Assembly
Preceded by Judy Hopwood	Member for Hornsby; 2011–2024	Succeeded by James Wallace
Political offices
Preceded by Dominic Perrottet	Treasurer of New South Wales; 2021–2023	Succeeded by Daniel Mookhey
Preceded by Don Harwin as Minister for Energy and Utilities	Minister for Energy; 2019–2023	Succeeded by Penny Sharpe
Preceded by Gabrielle Upton	Minister for Environment; 2019–2021	Succeeded by James Griffin as Minister for Environment and Heritage
Preceded by Victor Dominello	Minister for Innovation and Better Regulation; 2017–2019	Succeeded by Kevin Anderson as Minister for Better Regulation and Innovation
Party political offices
Preceded by Stuart Ayres	Deputy Leader of the New South Wales Liberal Party; 2022–2023	Succeeded by Natalie Ward
Preceded by Stuart Ayres	Deputy Leader of the Liberal Party in the New South Wales Legislative Assembly; 2022–2023	Succeeded by Robyn Preston
