= James Wallace (Australian politician) =

James Wallace MP

Member of the New South Wales Legislative Assembly for Hornsby
- Incumbent
- Assumed office 19 October 2024
- Preceded by: Matt Kean

Personal details
- Party: Liberal
- Spouse: Sarah
- Children: 1
- Education: Macquarie University
- Occupation: Solicitor
- Website: NSW Liberal profile

James Robert Michael Wallace is an Australian politician. In 2024, he was selected by the NSW Liberals to contest the 2024 Hornsby by-election, in which he was elected.

Wallace grew up in North Epping and joined the Liberal Party in high school. He studied arts and law at Macquarie University and subsequently worked at a law firm as a senior associate. He became president of the NSW Young Liberals.

Wallace was criticised by Tony Abbott as a 'clone' of his predecessor Matt Kean.
