= Arthur Fuller =

Australian politician

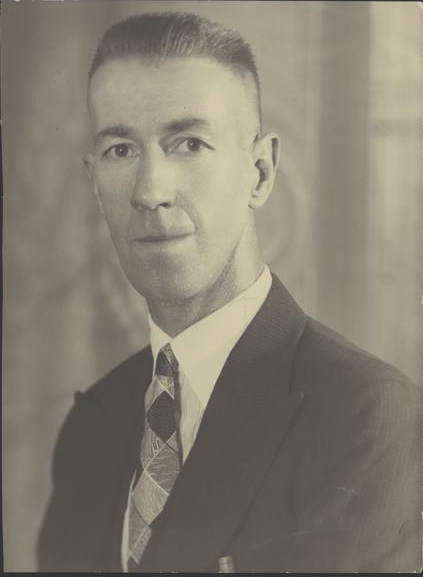

Member of the Australian Parliament for Hume
- In office 21 August 1943 – 10 December 1949
- Preceded by: Thomas Collins
- Succeeded by: Charles Anderson
- In office 28 April 1951 – 10 December 1955
- Preceded by: Charles Anderson
- Succeeded by: Charles Anderson
- In office 9 December 1961 – 30 November 1963
- Preceded by: Charles Anderson
- Succeeded by: Ian Pettitt

Personal details
- Born: 24 October 1893 Gundagai, New South Wales
- Died: 21 March 1987 (aged 93)
- Party: Australian Labor Party
- Spouse: Vera Hoad
- Occupation: Clothing store manager

Arthur Nieberding Fuller (24 October 1893 – 21 March 1987) was a long-serving member of the Australian House of Representatives.

Born in Gundagai to a goldminer and his wife, Fuller spent his childhood in the New South Wales goldfields. He later managed a clothing store in Cobar before moving to Tumut in 1919 to open a clothing store of his own. In 1921, Fuller met and married Vera Hoad, with whom he had two daughters, and established a Labor Party branch in Tumut (for which he served as secretary until 1971).

== Political career ==
With his daughter Zelda as his campaign manager, Fuller first contested the Division of Hume at the 1940 election as the official Labor candidate, but lost to Tom Collins, the sitting Country Party member, due partly to candidates from the Lang Labor and New South Wales Labor factions standing and splitting the Labor vote.

Fuller successfully contested Hume at the 1943 election as part of the Curtin Labor landslide. In his maiden speech, Fuller stated his full support for the nationalisation of airlines and banks and that "the Commonwealth Parliament should assume supreme control of land and all other national resources, including money." However, Fuller was not averse to criticising Labor policy when it detrimentally affected his constituents, such as in April 1944 when he accused Labor leaders of stifling the economic development of the New South Wales Riverina district (which encompassed Hume).

In parliament, Fuller quickly gained a reputation as one of its quirkier members. A tall, thin man with a long neck, Fuller was nicknamed "Pilsener" due to his resemblance to long thin pilsener bottles. His inclination for long, loud speeches led one reporter to write that Fuller was "at times likely to rant about things he was passionate about without thought for tact", while his idiosyncratic dress sense became a subject of mirth for the Canberra Press Gallery.

Following his successful re-election in 1946, Fuller was given the official job of Government Whip and the unofficial job of chief heckler of opposition speakers, particularly Jack Lang.

Fuller lost to his Country Party opponent Charles Anderson by 767 votes at the 1949 election, following a campaign by the Country Party linking Fuller to the Communist menace. In 1951, he regained Hume by 796 votes but lost it to Anderson again by 1715 votes in 1955 before regaining it again from Anderson by 704 votes at the 1961 election.

By the 1963 election Fuller, in failing health, no longer had to face his old opponent Anderson but had lost much of his support base, with long-time supporter The Tumut and Adelong Times urging a vote against "our grand old man of politics".

Following his loss to his Country Party opponent Ian Pettitt, Fuller retired to Tumut.

Parliament of Australia
| Preceded by Thomas Collins | Member for Hume; 1943–1949 | Succeeded by Charles Anderson |
| Preceded by Charles Anderson | Member for Hume; 1951–1955 | Succeeded by Charles Anderson |
| Preceded by Charles Anderson | Member for Hume; 1961–1963 | Succeeded by Ian Pettitt |
