= Charles Groves Wright Anderson =

Australian soldier, farmer, and politician

Charles Groves Wright Anderson VC MC
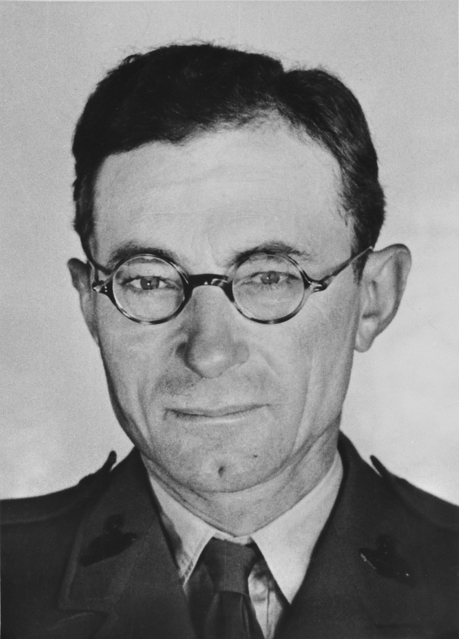

Member of the Australian Parliament for Hume
- In office 10 December 1949 – 28 April 1951
- Preceded by: Arthur Fuller
- Succeeded by: Arthur Fuller
- In office 10 December 1955 – 9 December 1961
- Preceded by: Arthur Fuller
- Succeeded by: Arthur Fuller

Personal details
- Born: 12 February 1897 Cape Town, Cape Colony
- Died: 11 November 1988 (aged 91) Red Hill, Australia
- Party: ACP
- Profession: Farmer, soldier, politician

Military service
- Allegiance: United Kingdom; Australia
- Branch/service: British Army; Australian Army
- Years of service: 1914–1919; 1939–1945
- Rank: Lieutenant colonel
- Commands: 2/19th Battalion (1941–1942)
- Battles/wars: First World War; East African campaign; Second World War; Battle of Muar
- Awards: Victoria Cross; Military Cross

Lieutenant Colonel Charles Groves Wright Anderson VC MC (12 February 1897 – 11 November 1988) was a South African-born Australian soldier, farmer, and politician. He was a recipient of the Victoria Cross and a member of the Australian House of Representatives.

After growing up in Africa and being schooled in England, Anderson served as an officer during the East African campaign against the Germans during the First World War, reaching the rank of captain and being awarded the Military Cross. After the war, Anderson settled as a farmer in Kenya. In the early 1930s, he married an Australian woman and later moved to Australia, where he became a grazier. In 1939, he joined the Militia, Australia's part-time military force, before volunteering for overseas service after the outbreak of the Second World War. In early 1941, he was deployed to Malaya as part of the 8th Division, where he rose to command the 2/19th Battalion against the Japanese following their invasion of Malaya in December of that year. For his actions around Muar in January 1942, he was awarded the Victoria Cross before being captured at the end of the fighting on Singapore. He spent over three years in Japanese captivity, before being released at the end of the war.

In the post-war years, Anderson returned to farming and served as a federal parliamentarian, representing the Division of Hume twice between 1949 and 1961, before retiring. He died in Canberra at the age of 91.

== Early life ==
Anderson was born on 12 February 1897 in Cape Town, South Africa, to Scottish parents. His father, Alfred Gerald Wright Anderson, an auditor and newspaper editor, had been born in England, while his mother, Emma (Maïa) Louise Antoinette, née Trossaert had been born in Belgium. The middle child of five, when Anderson was three the family moved to Nairobi in Kenya, where his father began farming. He attended a local school until 1907, when his parents sent him to England. He lived with family members until 1910, when he was accepted to attend St Brendan's College in Bristol as a boarder.

He remained in England until the outbreak of the First World War. Returning to Kenya, in November 1914, Anderson enlisted as a soldier in the local forces, before later being allocated to the Calcutta Volunteer Battalion as a gunner. On 13 October 1916, he was commissioned as a lieutenant in the King's African Rifles. He fought with the regiment's 3rd Battalion in the East African campaign against the Askari soldiers of the German colonial forces. Anderson was awarded the Military Cross for his service in this campaign.

Following the war, having reached the rank of temporary captain, Anderson was demobilised in February 1919 and lived the life of a gentleman farmer in Kenya, marrying Edith Tout, an Australian, in February 1931. He remained active as a part-time soldier and was promoted to substantive captain in 1932. Two years later the couple moved to Australia where they purchased a grazing property near Young, New South Wales. He joined the Citizens Military Forces in March 1939, being appointed to the 56th Infantry Battalion as a captain. Following the outbreak of the Second World War, Anderson was temporarily promoted to the rank of major in October 1939. In June 1940, he volunteered for overseas service by joining the Second Australian Imperial Force.

== Second World War ==
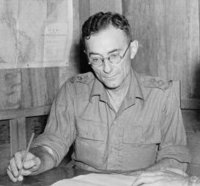
Anderson in Thailand, 14 September 1945

In July 1940, Anderson was assigned to the newly formed 2/19th Infantry Battalion, part of the 22nd Brigade, of the 8th Division. Recruited from New South Wales, after training around Ingleburn and then Bathurst, in February 1941 the 22nd Brigade was deployed to Malaya to bolster the garrison there amidst concerns about Japanese intentions in the region.

Holding the rank of major, Anderson was appointed second-in-command of the battalion and due to his experience in jungle warfare, he was placed in charge of training the battalion's soldiers to use the jungle as a "friend". In August he was promoted to lieutenant colonel and took over as commanding officer of the 2/19th. The war in the Pacific began on 7 December 1941 when Japanese landed on the north-east coast of Malaya around Kota Bahru and launched thrusts along the western coast of the Malay Peninsula from Thailand. Initially the 2/19th was not committed to the fighting, but in mid-January, after the Japanese advance had pushed the British Commonwealth troops back to Johore, the 2/19th was detached from the 22nd Brigade and sent to the west coast to support the hard-pressed battalions of 'Westforce', an ad hoc formation consisting of Australian and Indian troops.

During the period of 18–22 January 1942 in the Battle of Muar near the Muar River, the 44-year-old Anderson was in command of a small force which destroyed ten enemy tanks. When they were later cut off, Anderson led his force through fifteen miles (24 km) of enemy-occupied territory, being attacked by air and ground forces all the way. Many times in the journey from Muar to Parit Sulong, Anderson had to lead bayonet charges and hand-to-hand combat against the Japanese.

Anderson is famous for leading the Allied attack in Parit Sulong against the Japanese when the Allies were retreating to Yong Peng to meet up with the main force heading for Singapore. Upon reaching the small town of Parit Sulong on the way, they discovered their way blocked because the main bridge was already in Japanese hands with a Japanese machine gun defending the bridge. They were surrounded and a heavy battle ensued for several days in Parit Sulong. The Allied troops at Yong Peng under Gordon Bennett unsuccessfully attempted to break through the Japanese lines to reinforce Anderson's men, but without reinforcements, Anderson and his troops had to try many times to recapture the bridge but was unable to do so. Heavily outnumbered, Anderson's Australian and Indian troops were attacked and harassed continuously by Japanese tanks, machine gun, mortar and air attacks and suffered heavy casualties. Yet they held their position for several days and refused to surrender. During the battle, Anderson had tried to evacuate the wounded by using an ambulance, but the Japanese would not let the vehicles pass the bridge.

Although the detachment attempted to fight its way through another eight miles (13 km) of enemy-occupied territory to Yong Peng, this proved impossible, and Anderson had to destroy his equipment and attempted to work his way around the enemy. Anderson then ordered every able man to escape through the jungle to link up with the retreating main force in Yong Peng heading for Singapore. They had no choice but to leave the wounded to be cared for by the enemy, assuming the Japanese would take care of the wounded. But unfortunately, the Japanese unit at Parit Sulong later executed the approximately 150 wounded Australian and Indian soldiers next to the bridge of Parit Sulong, in the Parit Sulong Massacre.

For his brave actions and leadership in Muar and the difficult retreat from Muar to Parit Sulong and the subsequent difficult battle at Parit Sulong led by Anderson, he was awarded the highest and most prestigious decoration for gallantry in the face of the enemy that could be awarded to British Commonwealth forces.

His VC citation, as listed in the London Gazette on 13 February 1942, states: "...for setting a magnificent example of brave leadership, determination and outstanding courage. He not only showed fighting qualities of very high order but throughout exposed himself to danger without any regard for his own personal safety".

Following the action around Muar and Parit Sulong, Anderson went to Singapore, as the Allies withdrew across the Causeway to prepare a line of defence. Shortly afterwards he was hospitalised and, as a result, missed the majority of the fighting following the Japanese landings on 8 February 1942. As the situation became desperate, on 13 February, Anderson discharged himself and returned to the heavily mauled 2/19th, by then down to just 180 men from its authorised strength of 900. He led them until the surrender was announced two days later.

Anderson was captured and for the next three years was held as a prisoner of war. He was the chief staff officer under Brigadier Arthur Varley of the 22nd Brigade in A Force – the first contingent of POWs at Changi to voluntarily avail themselves of a Japanese "offer" to move to a new location where they were told there would be abundant food and a healthy climate. In reality the group of 3,000 were shipped to Burma and were used as slave labour to build the 415 km railway link between Nong Pladuk in Thailand and Thanbyuzayat in Burma. Throughout his time in captivity, Anderson worked to mitigate the hardships of other prisoners, leading by personal example and maintaining morale. At the end of the war, Anderson was repatriated back to Australia. His appointment in the army was terminated on 21 December 1945 and he returned to his property in New South Wales.

== Later life ==
Charles Anderson entered politics in 1949, winning the Division of Hume in the House of Representatives for the Country Party, with an 18.8% swing. He lost his seat in the 1951 federal election and unsuccessfully stood for Hume at the subsequent 1954 election. However, he regained the seat at the 1955 election and remained in parliament until his defeat at the 1961 election. While in parliament Anderson served as a member of both the joint committee on the Australian Capital Territory and the joint committee on foreign affairs.

Between 1957 and 1960, although he was retired from active military service, Anderson fulfilled the role of honorary colonel of the 4th and 56th Battalions. Anderson owned farming properties around Young, New South Wales, and following his retirement from politics in 1961, moved permanently to Red Hill in Canberra, where he died in 1988. He was survived by three of his four children. There is a memorial stone and plaque for Anderson at Norwood Crematorium, Australian Capital Territory. His Victoria Cross is displayed at the Australian War Memorial, Canberra, Australia.

== Honours and awards ==

Victoria Cross (VC)	(1942)
Military Cross (MC)	(1916)
1914–15 Star	
British War Medal	
Victory Medal	
1939–1945 Star	
Pacific Star	
Defence Medal	
War Medal 1939–1945	
Australia Service Medal 1939–45	
Queen Elizabeth II Coronation Medal	
Queen Elizabeth II Silver Jubilee Medal	

In common with other Victoria Cross and George Cross recipients living at the time, after his service in the two world wars Anderson also received both the Queen Elizabeth II Coronation Medal (1953) and the Queen Elizabeth II Silver Jubilee Medal (1977). Both of these medals form part of his medal set, which is held by the Australian War Memorial.

== Notes ==
Parliament of Australia
Preceded by Arthur Fuller	Member for Hume; 1949–1951; 1955–1961	Succeeded by Arthur Fuller
