= Sydney Storey =

Australian politician

Personal details
- Born: 27 February 1896 Balmain, New South Wales
- Died: 11 September 1966 (aged 70) Hornsby, New South Wales
- Party: Independent United Australia Party Liberal Party

Sydney Albert Dawson Storey (27 February 1896 – 11 September 1966) was an Australian politician and a member of the New South Wales Legislative Assembly between 1941 and 1962. In parliament he represented the United Australia Party (UAP) and its successor, the Liberal Party, and ended his parliamentary career as a conservative independent.

Storey was born in Balmain, New South Wales, and was educated at Cleveland Street High School and the University of Sydney. He was initially employed as a clerk but trained as a draftsman and eventually became a hospital administrator. He was an executive of the New South Wales Hospital Association and the Hospital Contributions Fund, a co-operative health insurance provider. Between 1930 and his death, Storey was a Hornsby Shire councillor. He was the Shire President in 1933–34 and 1947–50.

After two unsuccessful campaigns, Storey entered the New South Wales Parliament at the 1941 election as the independent member for Hornsby. The sitting UAP member, James Shand, had decided to contest the neighbouring seat of Ryde and Storey defeated the endorsed UAP candidate, Wilfred Francis. Storey retained the seat at the next six elections, becoming a member of the Liberal Party shortly after it was formed in 1945.

Storey lost Liberal pre-selection before the 1962 election and unsuccessfully contested the seat as an independent. He never held party, parliamentary or ministerial office.

His father was the NSW Labor politician Thomas Storey, and his uncle was NSW Labor Premier John Storey.

New South Wales Legislative Assembly
Preceded by James Shand	Member for Hornsby; 1941–1962	Succeeded by John Maddison
