= Ian Pettitt =

Australian politician

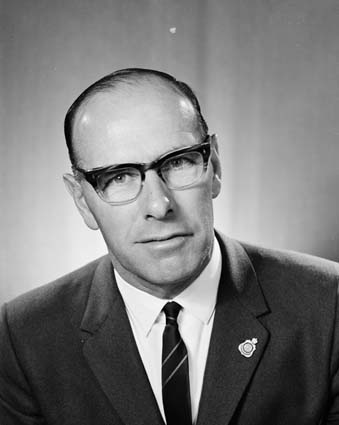

Member of the Australian Parliament for Hume
- In office 30 November 1963 – 2 December 1972
- Preceded by: Arthur Fuller
- Succeeded by: Frank Olley

Personal details
- Born: John Alexander Pettitt; 25 September 1910 Geelong, Victoria
- Died: 25 December 1977 (aged 67)
- Party: Australian Country Party
- Occupation: Farmer

Military service
- Allegiance: Australia
- Branch/service: Australian Army
- Years of service: 1940–1943
- Rank: Gunner
- Unit: 2nd Anti Aircraft Regiment

John Alexander "Ian" Pettitt (25 September 1910 – 25 December 1977) was an Australian politician. He was a member of the Country Party and served in the House of Representatives from 1963 to 1972, representing the seat of Hume. He was a farmer before entering politics and a veteran of World War II.

== Early life ==
Pettitt was born on 25 September 1910 in Geelong, Victoria. He was one of four sons born to Marianne Hope (née Houston) and John Pettitt. His father was a farmer, timber merchant and landowner.

Pettitt was raised on the family property "Blinkbrae" in Bell Post Hill. He and his brothers were educated at The Geelong College.

Pettitt enlisted in the Australian Imperial Force in July 1940. He was posted to the 2/2nd Heavy Anti-Aircraft Regiment and trained at Puckapunyal before embarking for the Middle East in February 1941. He was evacuated with illness three times and returned to Australia in March 1942. Pettitt subsequently transferred to the 2/6th Anti-Aircraft Battery and was posted to Port Moresby in July 1942. He experienced two bouts of malaria and returned to Sydney in December 1942, being discharged from the AIF in June 1943.

== Politics ==
Pettit was elected to the House of Representatives at the 1963 federal election, winning the seat of Hume for the Country Party from the incumbent Australian Labor Party (ALP) member Arthur Fuller. He was re-elected at the 1966 and 1969 elections before losing his seat to ALP candidate Frank Olley at the 1972 election.

Pettitt served on the Joint Statutory Committee on Public Accounts from 1971 to 1972. In 1967 he visited the breakaway state of Rhodesia alongside fellow MPs Wylie Gibbs and Jim Killen. He visited Papua and New Guinea for two weeks in 1971 as chairman of the Coalition committee on external territories.

In 1966, Pettitt stood on a platform which included "a Riverina university, better technical and agricultural training, increased water supply for country towns, and with federal assistance, the construction of the Tumut–Canberra road and urgently needed developmental and main roads". After the disappearance of Harold Holt he suggested that the Tumut–Canberra road be named the Harold Holt Highway in his honour. Pettitt proposed the creation of a National Conservation Authority to replace the Snowy Mountains Scheme as a major regional employer. He campaigned for the Liberal candidate at the 1967 Corio by-election in his hometown of Geelong, but subsequently criticised the choice of candidate as "blundering and unbelievable" and said the party's defeat would restrain some of the ratbag members of the Federal Liberal Party, and bring them down to earth".

== Personal life ==
After the war's end, Pettitt and his wife established a farming and grazing property in Harden, New South Wales. It was operated as the Pettitt Pastoral Company.

Pettitt died on 25 December 1977, aged 67.

Parliament of Australia
Preceded by Arthur Fuller	Member for Hume; 1963–1972	Succeeded by Frank Olley
