= Frank Olley =

Australian politician (1927–1988)

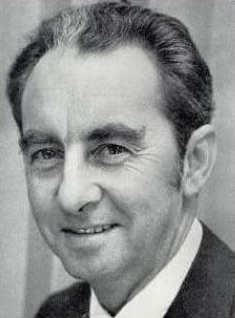

Member of the Australian Parliament for Hume
- In office 2 December 1972 – 18 May 1974
- Preceded by: Ian Pettitt
- Succeeded by: Stephen Lusher

Personal details
- Born: 18 January 1927 Sydney
- Died: 21 July 1988 (aged 61) Canberra
- Party: Australian Labor Party
- Children: Sandra, Peter, David, Michele
- Occupation: Electrical tradesman

Frank Olley (18 January 1927 – 21 July 1988) was an Australian politician. Born in Sydney, he was educated at Granville Technical College before becoming an electrical tradesman with the Electricity Commission of New South Wales. He was involved in local politics as a member of Yass Municipal Council. In 1972, he defeated Country Party member, Ian Pettitt, in the seat of Hume, entering the Australian House of Representatives as a member of the Labor Party. He was defeated in 1974 by Country Party candidate, Stephen Lusher. Olley died in 1988.

Parliament of Australia
| Preceded by Ian Pettitt | Member for Hume; 1972–1974 | Succeeded by Stephen Lusher |
