= Thomas Collins (Australian politician) =

Australian politician and stock and station agent

The Honourable Thomas Collins
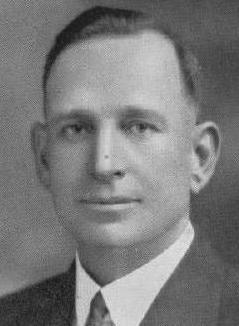

Postmaster-General of Australia
- In office 26 June 1941 – 7 October 1941
- Prime Minister: Robert Menzies; Arthur Fadden
- Preceded by: George McLeay
- Succeeded by: Bill Ashley

Member of the Australian Parliament for Hume
- In office 9 December 1931 – 21 August 1943
- Preceded by: Parker Moloney
- Succeeded by: Arthur Fuller

Personal details
- Born: 6 April 1884 Yass, New South Wales, Australia
- Died: 15 April 1945 (aged 61) Young, New South Wales, Australia
- Party: Country
- Spouse: Ruby Violet Summerhayes
- Occupation: Company manager

Thomas Joseph Collins (6 April 1884 – 15 April 1945) was an Australian politician and businessman. He was a member of the Country Party and served in the House of Representatives from 1931 to 1943. He briefly served as Postmaster-General of Australia in 1941.

== Early life ==
Collins was born at Yass, New South Wales to storekeeper John Collins and Mary, née Hartigan. In 1902, having attended the local Catholic school, he enlisted in the 5th Battalion, Australian Commonwealth Horse, to fight in the Boer War. However, by the time Collins's unit arrived, the war had finished.

Collins moved to Young in 1906, where in 1911 he began his own business, which prospered. On 17 February 1914 he married Ruby Violet Summerhayes. He built his firm Collins, Ellerman & Co., to one of the largest stock and property businesses in New South Wales.

== Politics ==
Collins had always been interested in politics and had contested the federal seat of Newcastle in 1913, being a close associate of Charles Hardy, leader of the Riverina Movement. At the 1931 Australian federal election, he defeated Parker Moloney for the federal seat of Hume for the Country Party. He was never a significant parliamentarian, despite his entertaining manner, and was mainly a representative of rural issues.

Collins was embroiled in the United Australia Party-Country Party leadership conflict which ensued after the death of Prime Minister Joseph Lyons in 1939. The Country Party leader, Sir Earle Page, attempted to prevent Sir Robert Menzies from becoming prime minister by exploiting UAP divisions. Collins voiced support of Page on radio, but the following day Page attacked Menzies in parliament, causing Sir Arthur Fadden and Bernard Corser to resign from the Country Party. Collins too distanced himself from Page and, together with Oliver Badman, announced he would not attend party meetings headed by Page.

On 26 April Menzies formed a government, and Page resigned as leader of the Country Party. Collins, Fadden, Corser and Badman were not permitted to vote in the subsequent leadership ballot, in which Page supporter Archie Cameron became leader. Menzies, perhaps in gratitude, made Collins Minister Assisting the Prime Minister (dealing with external territories) and Minister Assisting the Minister for the Interior. In June 1941 he was appointed Postmaster-General, but only held the portfolio office until October that year, when the Curtin Labor government assumed office. Collins lost his seat at the 1943 federal election.

== Later life ==
Known for his charity, skill and support of many sports, Collins considered standing again for parliament, but died on 15 April 1945 of a sudden coronary sclerosis. He was survived by his wife and daughter, Mary Isabella Collins, who died on 22 October 1988.

Political offices
Preceded by George McLeay	Postmaster-General; 1941	Succeeded by Bill Ashley
Parliament of Australia
Preceded by Parker Moloney	Member for Hume; 1931–1943	Succeeded by Arthur Fuller
