= Stephen Lusher =

Australian politician

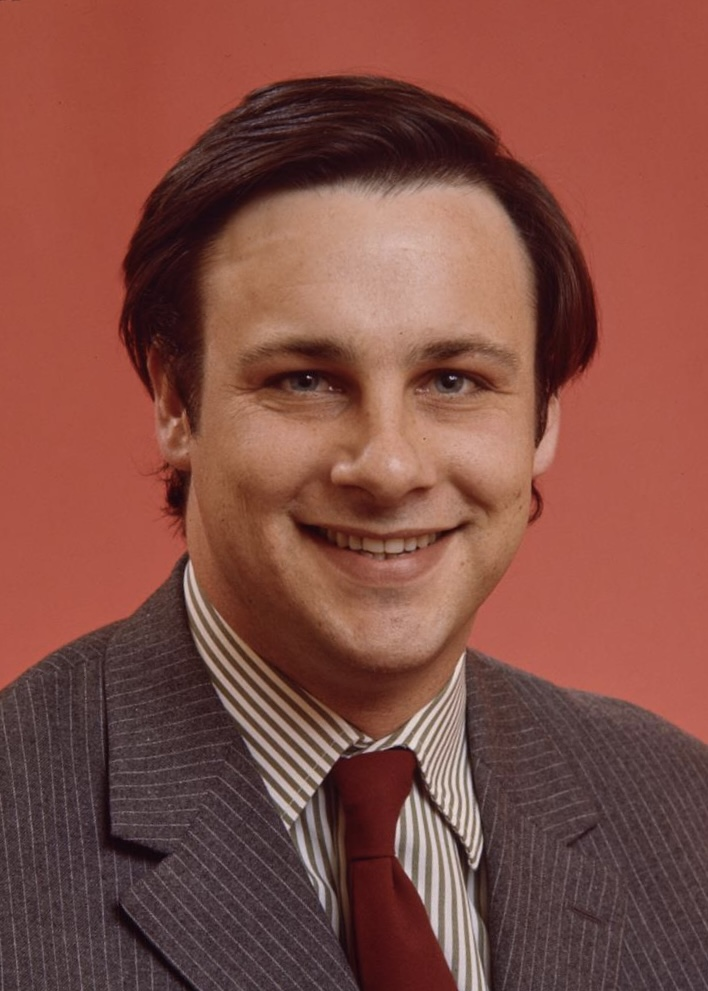
- Lusher in 1974

Member of the Australian Parliament for Hume
- In office 18 May 1974 – 1 December 1984
- Preceded by: Frank Olley
- Succeeded by: Wal Fife

Personal details
- Born: 18 October 1945 (age 80) North Sydney, New South Wales, Australia
- Party: National
- Parent: Edwin Lusher (father)
- Occupation: Stockbroker; Farmer

Stephen Augustus Lusher (born 18 October 1945) is a former Australian politician. He was a member of the House of Representatives from 1974 to 1984, representing the National Party.

== Early life ==
Lusher was born on 18 October 1945 in North Sydney, New South Wales. He is one of five children born to Gloria (née Lush) and Edwin Lusher. His father was a Sydney barrister who was appointed to the Supreme Court of New South Wales in the 1970s.

Lusher attended Saint Ignatius' College, Riverview. After leaving school he worked as a stockbroker in Sydney for a period and later was a sheep farmer near Goulburn, New South Wales.

== Politics ==
Lusher was involved with the Country Party from a young age and became assistant federal director of the party's national secretariat in Canberra. In April 1974, aged 28, he won preselection for the New South Wales seat of Hume against ten other candidates. He defeated the incumbent Australian Labor Party MP Frank Olley in Hume at the 1974 federal election, becoming the new parliament's youngest member.

In parliament, Lusher served on a number of committees. He was a member of the House Standing Committee on Expenditure from 1976 to 1984. He was the committee's chair from 1980 to 1983 and deputy chair from 1983 to 1984. Following the Coalition's defeat at the 1983 election, Lusher was given the transport portfolio in Andrew Peacock's shadow ministry. In January 1984, following the retirement of National Party leader Doug Anthony, he stood unsuccessfully for the party leadership and was defeated by Ian Sinclair. He then stood unsuccessfully for the deputy leadership, losing to Ralph Hunt.

Lusher lost his seat to incumbent Liberal Party MP Wal Fife at the 1984 election, which followed a major redistribution that impacted Fife's seat of Farrer.

== Personal life ==
Lusher had four children with his wife Cherie. After leaving politics, he established Lush on Bondi, a bar at the Bondi Pavilion. In 2008 he bought a villa in the Chianti Hills of Tuscany.

Parliament of Australia
Preceded by Frank Olley	Member for Hume; 1974–1984	Succeeded by Wal Fife
