= Health and environmental effects of transport =

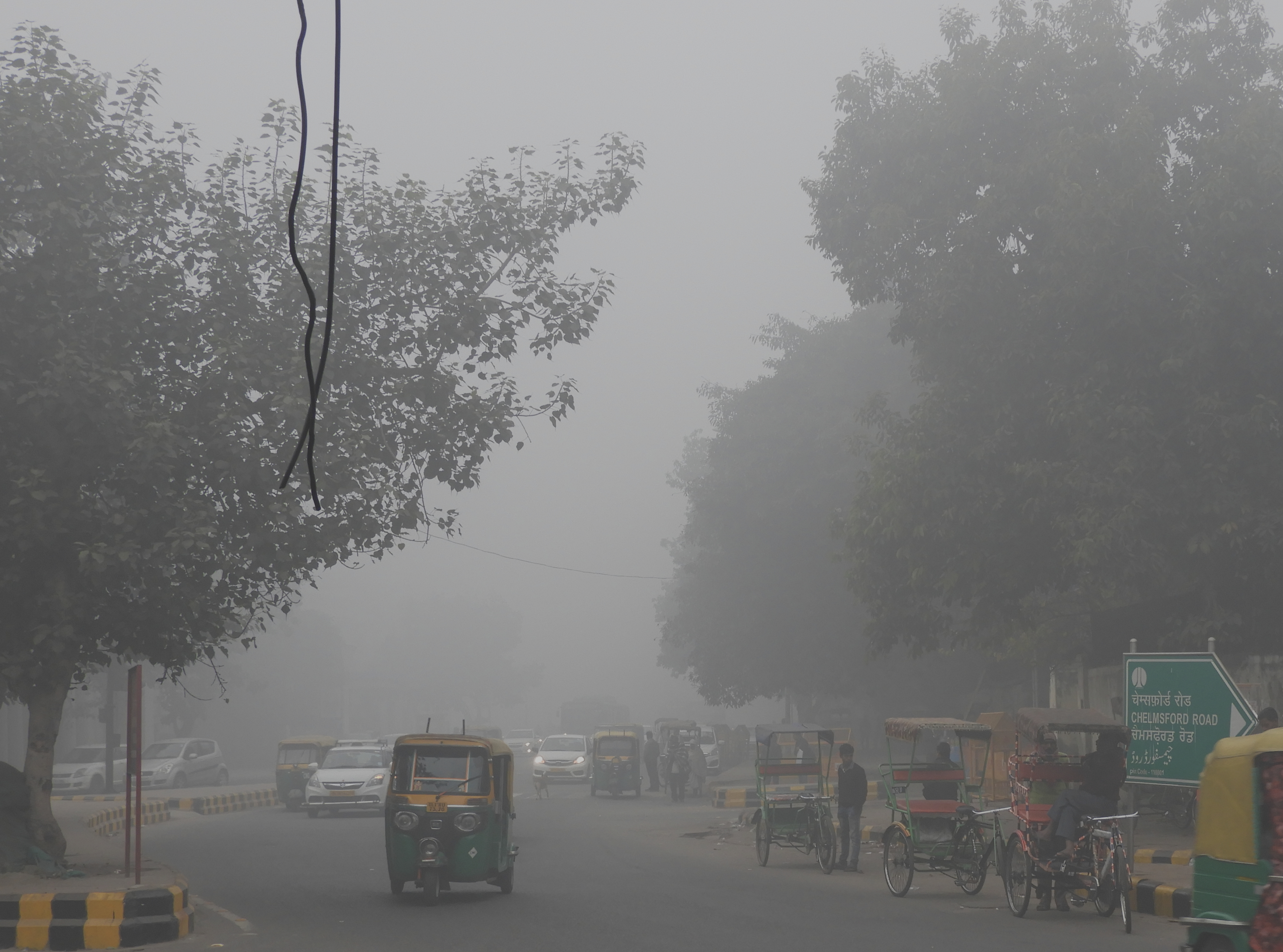
Diesel road vehicles are one cause of smog, pictured in Delhi

The health and environmental impact of transport is significant because transport burns most of the world's petroleum. This causes illness and deaths from air pollution, including nitrous oxides and particulates, and is a significant cause of climate change through emission of carbon dioxide. Within the transport sector, road transport is the largest contributor to climate change.

Environmental regulations in developed countries have reduced the individual vehicle's emission. However, this has been offset by an increase in the number of vehicles, and increased use of each vehicle (an effect known as the Jevons paradox). Some pathways to reduce the carbon emissions of road vehicles have been considerably studied. Energy use and emissions vary largely between modes, causing environmentalists to call for a transition from air and road to rail and human-powered transport, and increase transport electrification and energy efficiency.

Other environmental impacts of transport systems include traffic congestion and automobile-oriented urban sprawl, which can consume natural habitat and agricultural lands. By reducing transport emissions globally, it is predicted that there will be significant positive effects on Earth's air quality, acid rain, smog, and climate change. Health effects of transport include noise pollution and carbon monoxide emissions.

While electric cars are being built to cut down CO_{2} emission at the point of use, an approach that is becoming popular among cities worldwide is to prioritize public transport, bicycles, and pedestrian movement. Redirecting vehicle movement to create 20-minute neighbourhoods that promotes exercise while greatly reducing vehicle dependency and pollution. Some policies include levying a congestion charge on cars travelling within congested areas during rush hour.

== Types of effects ==
The most important impacts of transportation involve several dimensions: climate change, air quality, noise, water quality, soil quality, biodiversity, and land take.

=== Emissions ===
The transportation sector is a major source of greenhouse gas emissions (GHGs) globally. An estimated 30 percent of national GHGs are directly attributable to transportation—and in some regions, the proportion is even higher. According to the International Energy Agency (IEA), the transportation sector accounts for more than one-third of CO_{2} emissions globally.

Transportation methods are the greatest contributing source of GHGs in the U.S., accounting for 47 percent of the net increase in total U.S. emissions since 1990.

=== Land ===
Other environmental effects of transport systems include traffic congestion and automobile-oriented urban sprawl, which can consume natural habitat and agricultural lands. By reducing transportation emissions globally, it is predicted that there will be significant positive effects on Earth's air quality, acid rain, smog and climate change.

=== Health ===
The health effects of transport emissions are also of concern. A recent survey of the studies on the effect of traffic emissions on pregnancy outcomes has linked exposure to emissions to adverse effects on gestational duration and possibly also intrauterine growth.

Noise pollution and carbon monoxide emissions create direct and harmful effects on the environment, along with indirect effects. The indirect effects are often of higher consequence which leads to the misconception that it's the opposite since it is frequently understood that initial effects cause the most damage. For example, particulates which are the outcome of incomplete combustion done by an internal combustion engine, are not linked with respiratory and cardiovascular problems since they contribute to other factors not only to that specific condition. Even though the environmental effects are usually listed individually there are also cumulative effects.

== Mode ==
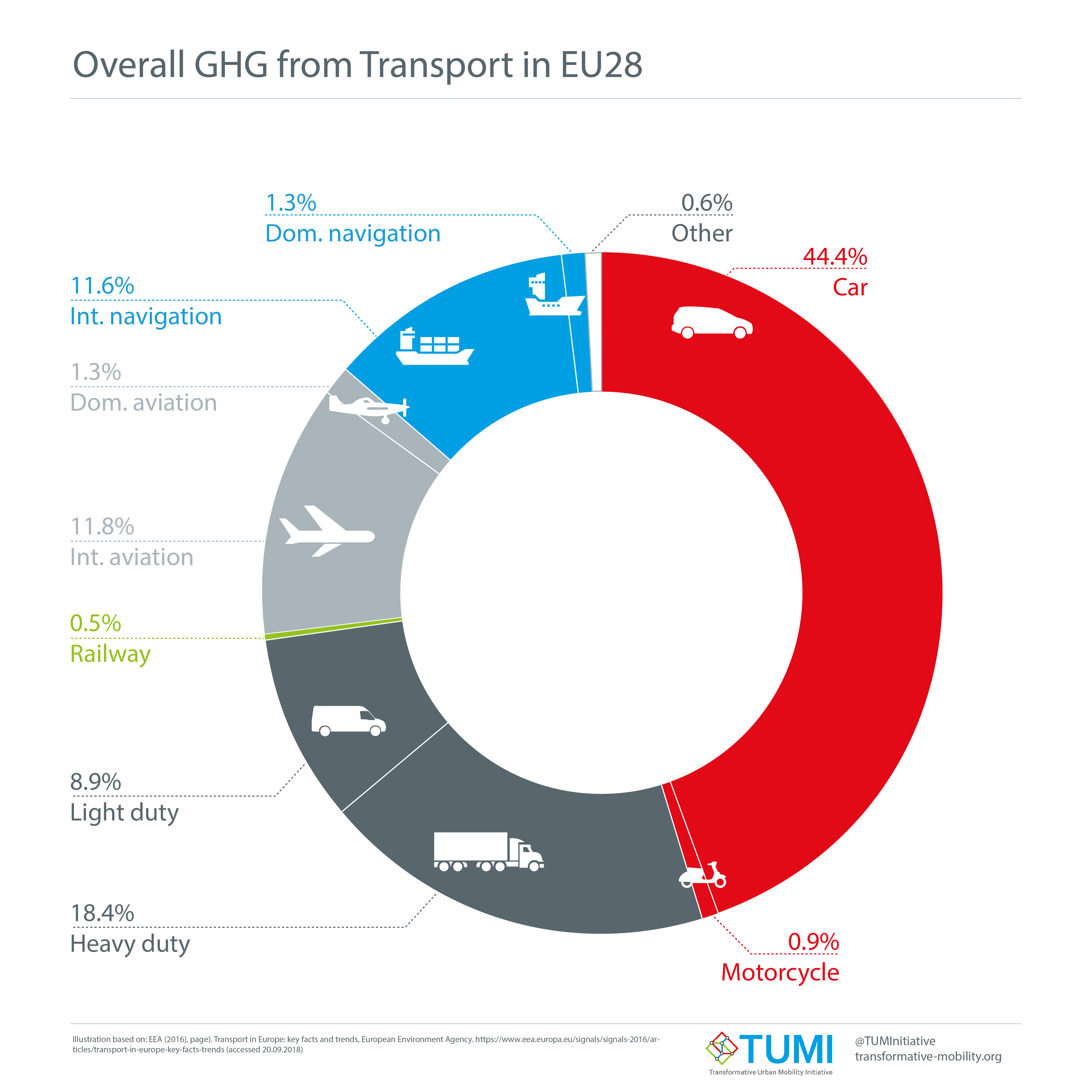
Overall GHG from transport in the European Union

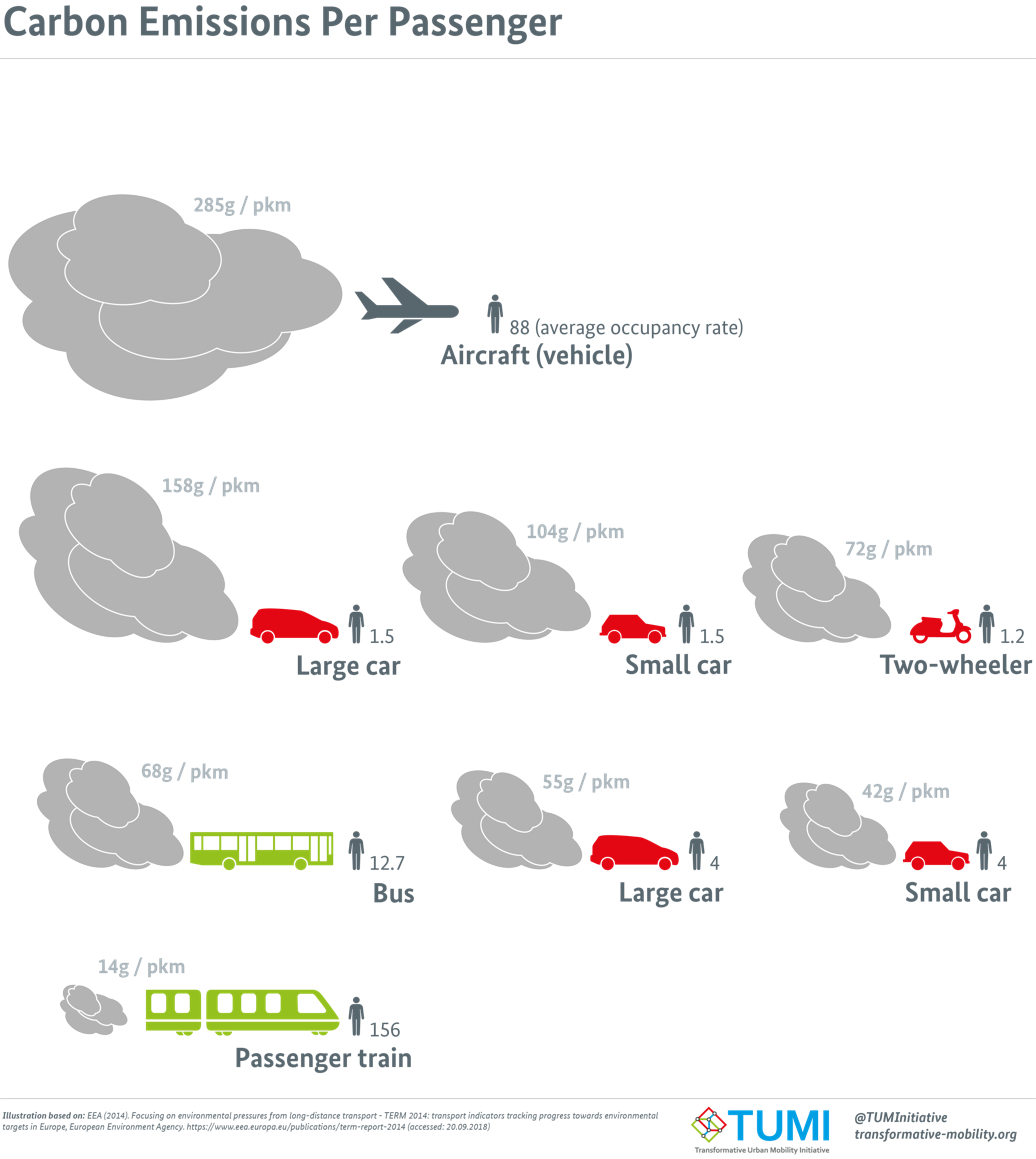
Carbon emissions per passenger in the European Union

The following table compares the emissions of the different transport means for passenger transport in Europe:

Transport means	Passengers average	Emissions (g CO_{2}/(km*pax))
Train	156	14
Small car	4	42
Big car	4	55
Bus	12.7	68
Motorbike	1.2	72
Small car	1.5	104
Big car	1.5	158
Plane	88	285

=== Aviation ===
Aviation emissions vary based on length of flight. For covering long distances, longer flights are a better investment of the high energy costs of take-off and landing than very short flights, yet by nature of their length inevitably use much more energy. CO_{2} emissions from air travel range from 0.24 kg CO_{2} per passenger mile (0.15 kg/km per passenger) for short flights down to 0.18 kg CO_{2} per passenger mile (0.11 kg/km per passenger) for long flights. Researchers have been raising concern about the globally increasing hypermobility of society, involving frequent and often long-distance air travel and the resulting environmental and climate effects. This threatens to overcome gains made in the efficiency of aircraft and their operations. Climate scientist Kevin Anderson raised concern about the growing effect of air transport on the climate in a paper[13] and a presentation[14] in 2008. He has pointed out that even at a reduced annual rate of increase in UK passenger air travel and with the government's targeted emissions reductions in other energy use sectors, by 2030 aviation would be causing 70% of the UK's allowable CO_{2} emissions.

Worse, aircraft emissions at stratospheric altitudes have a greater contribution to radiative forcing than do emissions at sea level, due to the effects of several greenhouses gases in the emissions, apart from CO_{2}. The other GHGs include methane (CH_{4}), NO_{x} which leads to ozone [O_{3}], and water vapor. Overall, in 2005 the radiative forcing caused by aviation amounted to 4.9% of all human-caused radiative forcing on Earth's heat balance.

=== Road transport ===
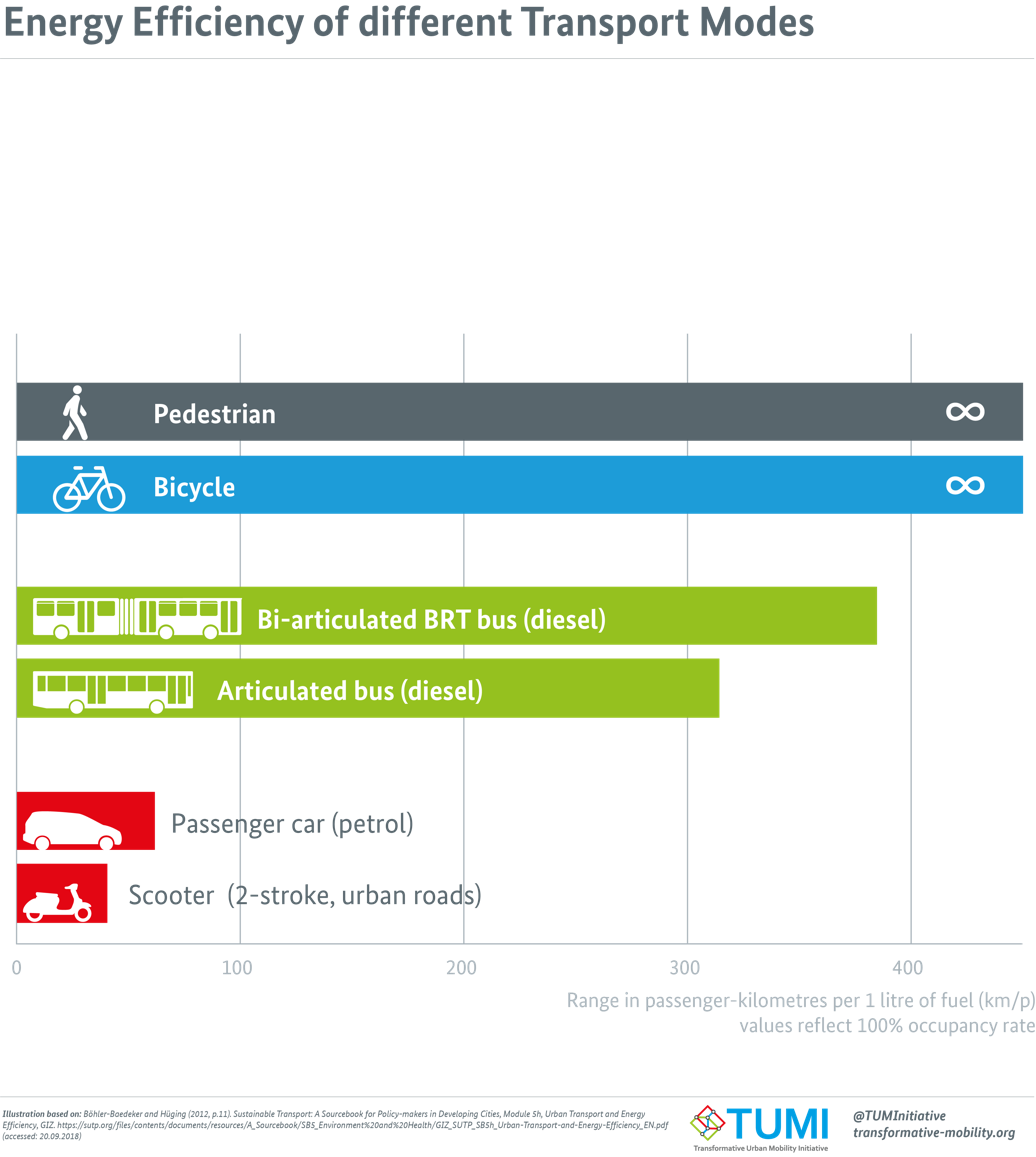

==== Cycling ====
Cycling has a low carbon-emission and low environmental footprint. A European study of thousands of urban dwellers found that daily mobility-related CO_{2} emissions were 3.2 kg (7.1 lb) of CO_{2} per person, with car travel contributing 70% and cycling 1% (including the entire lifecycle of vehicles and fuels). 'Cyclists' had 84% lower lifecycle CO_{2} emissions from all daily travel than 'non-cyclists', and the more people cycled on a daily basis, the lower was their mobility-related carbon footprint. Motorists who shifted travel modes from cars to bikes as their 'main method of travel' emitted 7.1 kg (16 lb) less CO_{2} per day. Regular cycling was most strongly associated with reduced life cycle CO_{2} emissions for commuting and social trips.

Changing from motorised to non-motorised travel behaviour can also have significant effects. A European study of nearly 2000 participants showed that an average person cycling 1 trip/day more and driving 1 trip/day less for 200 days a year would decrease mobility-related lifecycle CO_{2} emissions by about 0.5 tonnes over a year, representing a substantial share of average per capita CO_{2} emissions from transport (which are about 1.5 to 2.5 tonnes per year, depending on where you live).

==== Cars ====
Trucks' share of US vehicles produced, has tripled since 1975. Though vehicle fuel efficiency has increased within each category, the overall trend toward less efficient types of vehicles has offset some of the benefits of greater fuel economy and reduction of pollution and carbon dioxide emissions. Without the shift towards SUVs, energy use per unit distance could have fallen 30% more than it did from 2010 to 2022.

When burned, unleaded gasoline produces 8.91 kg (19.6 lb) of CO_{2} per gallon, while diesel produces 10.15 kg (22.4 lb). CO_{2} emissions originating from ethanol are disregarded by international agreements however so gasoline containing 10% ethanol would only be considered to produce 8.02 kg (17.7 lb) of CO_{2} per gallon. The average fuel economy for new light-duty vehicles sold in the US of the 2017 model year was about 24.9 MPG giving around 0.36 kg (0.79 lb) of CO_{2} per mile. The Department of Transportation's MOBILE 6.2 model, used by regional governments to model air quality, uses a fleet average (all cars, old and new) of 20.3 mpg giving around 0.44 kg (0.97 lb) of CO_{2} per mile.

In Europe, the European Commission enforced that from 2015 all new cars registered shall not emit more than an average of 0.13 kg (0.29 lb) of CO_{2} per kilometre (kg CO_{2}/km). The target is that by 2021 the average emissions for all new cars is 0.095 kg (0.21 lb) of CO_{2} per kilometre.

==== Buses ====
On average, inner city commuting buses emit 0.3 kg (0.66 lb) of CO_{2} per passenger mile (0.18 kg/km per passenger), and long distance (>20 mi, >32 km) bus trips emit 0.08 kg of CO_{2} per passenger mile (0.05 kg/km per passenger). Road and transportation conditions vary, so some carbon calculations add 10% to the total distance of the trip to account for potential traffic jams, detours, and pit-stops that may arise.

=== Rail ===
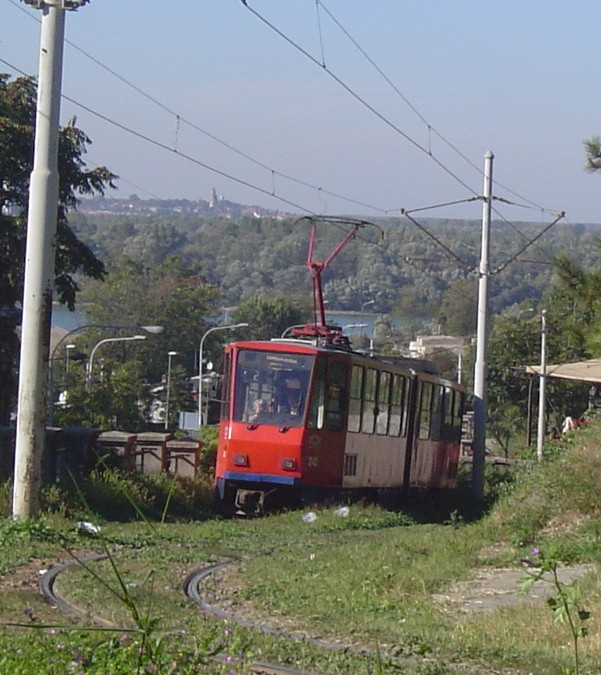
Green tramway track in Belgrade, Serbia

On average, commuter rail and subway trains emit 0.17 kg (0.37 lb) of CO_{2} per passenger mile (0.11 kg/km per passenger), and long distance (>20 mi, >32 km) trains emit 0.19 kg (0.42 lb) of CO_{2} per passenger mile (0.12 kg/km per passenger). Some carbon calculations add 10% to the total trip distance to account for detours, stop-overs, and other issues that may arise.

Electric trains contributes relatively less to the pollution as pollution happens in the power plants which are lot more efficient than diesel driven engines. Generally electric motors even when accounting for transmission losses are more efficient than internal combustion engines with efficiency further improving through recuperative braking.

Trains contain many different parts that have the potential to create noise. Wheels, engines and non-aerodynamic cargo are prone to vibrate at certain speeds. Noise caused from directly neighboring railways has the potential to lessen value to nearby property. In order to combat unbearable volumes resulting from railways, US diesel locomotives are required to be quieter than 90 decibels at 25 meters away since 1979. This noise, however, has been shown to be harmless to animals, except for horses who will become skittish.

Railway cargo can be a cause of pollution. Air pollution can occur from boxcars carrying materials such as iron ore, coal, soil, or aggregates and exposing these materials to the air. This can release nitrogen oxide, carbon monoxide, sulphur dioxide, or hydrocarbons into the air. Liquid pollution can come from railways contributing to a runoff into water sources, like groundwater or rivers and can result from spillage of fuels like oil into water supplies or onto land or discharge of human waste.

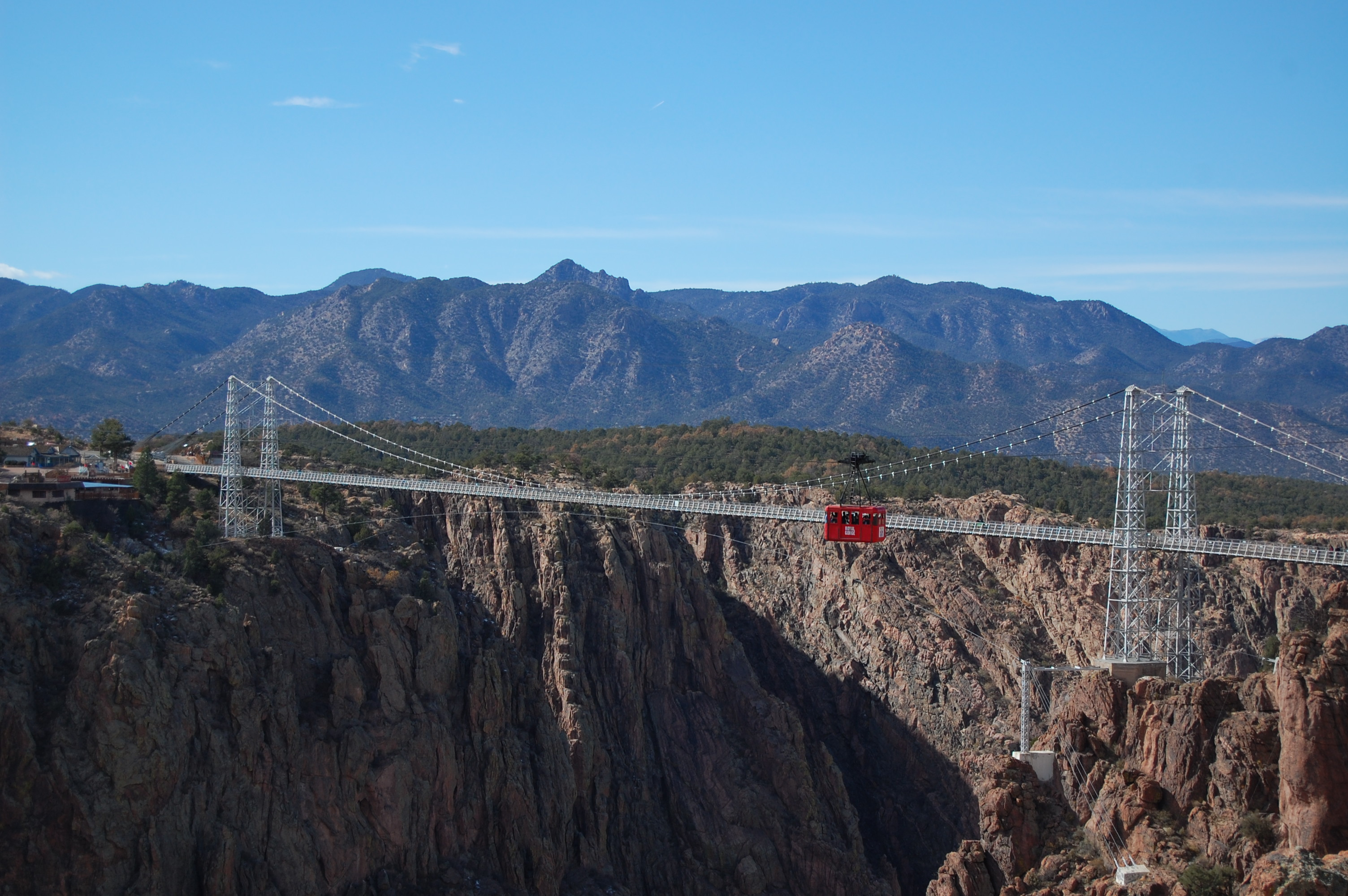
Royal Gorge Bridge, Canon City, Colorado

When railways are built in wilderness areas, the environment is visually altered by cuttings, embankments, dikes, and stilts.

== Shipping ==
Ballast water discharge from other sides of the world cause a certain type of pollution different from an emission type pollution as it introduces invasive species that can cause domestic species to go extinct.

Discharges of sewage into water bodies can come from many sources, including wastewater treatment facilities, runoff from livestock operations, and vessels. These discharges have the potential to impair water quality, adversely affecting aquatic environments and increasing the risks to human health. While sewage discharges have potentially wide-ranging effects on all aquatic environments, the effects may be especially problematic in marinas, slow-moving rivers, lakes and other bodies of water with low flushing rates. Environmentally this creates invasive species that often drive other species to their extinction and cause harm to the environment and local businesses.

Emissions from ships have much more significant environmental effects; many ships go internationally from port to port and are not seen for weeks, contributing to air and water pollution on its voyage. Emission of greenhouse gases displaces the amount of gas that allows for UV-rays through the ozone. Sulfur and nitrogen compounds emitted from ship will oxidize in the atmosphere to form sulfate and nitrate. Emissions of nitrogen oxides, carbon monoxide, and volatile organic compounds (VOC) will lead to enhanced surface ozone formation and methane oxidation, depleting the ozone. The effect of the international ship emission on the distribution of chemical compounds such as NO_{x}, CO, O_{3}, ^{•}OH, SO_{2}, HNO_{3}, and sulfate is studied using a global chemical transport model (CTM), the Oslo CTM2. In particular, the large-scale distribution and diurnal variation of the oxidants and sulfur compounds are studied interactively. Meteorological data (winds, temperature, precipitation, clouds, etc.) used as input for the CTM calculations are provided by a weather prediction model.

Shipping Emissions Factors:

Mode of Transport	kg of CO_{2} per Ton-Mile
Air cargo	0.8063
Truck	0.1693
Train	0.1048
Sea freight	0.0403

The road haulage industry is contributing around 20% of the UK's total carbon emissions a year, with only the energy industry having a larger contribution, at around 39%. Road haulage is a significant consumer of fossil fuels and associated carbon emissions – HGV vehicles account for almost 20 percent of total emissions.

== Influence of e-commerce ==
As large retail corporations in recent years have focused attention on eCommerce, many have begun to offer fast (e.g. 2-day) shipping. These fast shipping options get products and services to the hands of buyers faster than ever before, but they are negative externalities on public roads and climate change.. E-commerce shopping can be seen as the best way to reduce one's carbon footprint. Yet, this is only true to some extent. Shopping online is less energy intensive than driving to a physical store location and then driving back home. This is because shipping can take advantage of economies of scale. However, these benefits are diminished when e-commerce stores package items separately or when customers buy items separately and do not take the time to one stop shop or choose rush delivery. M. Sanjayan, the CEO of Conservation International, explains that getting your online purchase delivered at home in just two days puts more polluting vehicles on the road.

In the 2010s, consumers were demanding the fast delivery of goods and services. A survey in 2016 by UPS showed that 46% of online shoppers abandoned an unused shopping cart due to a shipping time that was way too long and that 1 and 3 online shoppers look at the speed of delivery from the marketplaces they buy from. However, a 2024 Mac Kinsey survey revealed new trends regarding delivery preferences of US consumers, with less prioritization of speed whilst more attention given to sensitivy to costs, reliability and return services as well as an interest in sustainability. Nevertheless average parcel delivery speed has accelerated by about 40 percent, going from 6.6 days to 4.2 days between 2020 and 2023.

In addition to standard shipping, consumers must be satisfied with their purchases so that they do not constantly returns items. By returning shipments on standard shipping, the positive contribution to environment is being taken back.

Since 2009, UPS deliveries have increased by 65%. With the increase in deliveries, there is an increased demand for trucks on the road, resulting in more carbon emissions. Through truck platooning, trucks are able to send signals to nearby trucks going a similar speed. This communication between vehicles reduces congestion on the roads, increasing fuel savings by 10 to 20%.

The growth of e-commerce has meant more packaging being used inefficiently.

Attempts to reduce the environmental impact of e-commerce have been explored, including through changes to companies’ business models:

- Lockers, involve a parcel pick up/return system from lockers located throughout a city which customers can easily access. It eliminates the particularly significant “last mile” issue
- The omnichannel retail strategy allows consumers to buy online but pick up their purchase in-store. Examples include IKEA, which has opened stores in cities for pick-up
- Incorporation of electric vehicles into company fleets
- Multiplying returns channels, in particular using in-store returns with in-store packaging

== Mitigation of environmental effects ==
European Investment Bank Climate survey result on countries that want to make public transport more efficient and ban high-emissions vehicles

=== Sustainable transport ===
Sustainable transport is transport with either lower environmental footprint per passenger, per distance or higher capacity. Typically sustainable transport modes are rail, bicycle and walking.

=== Sustainable rail ===
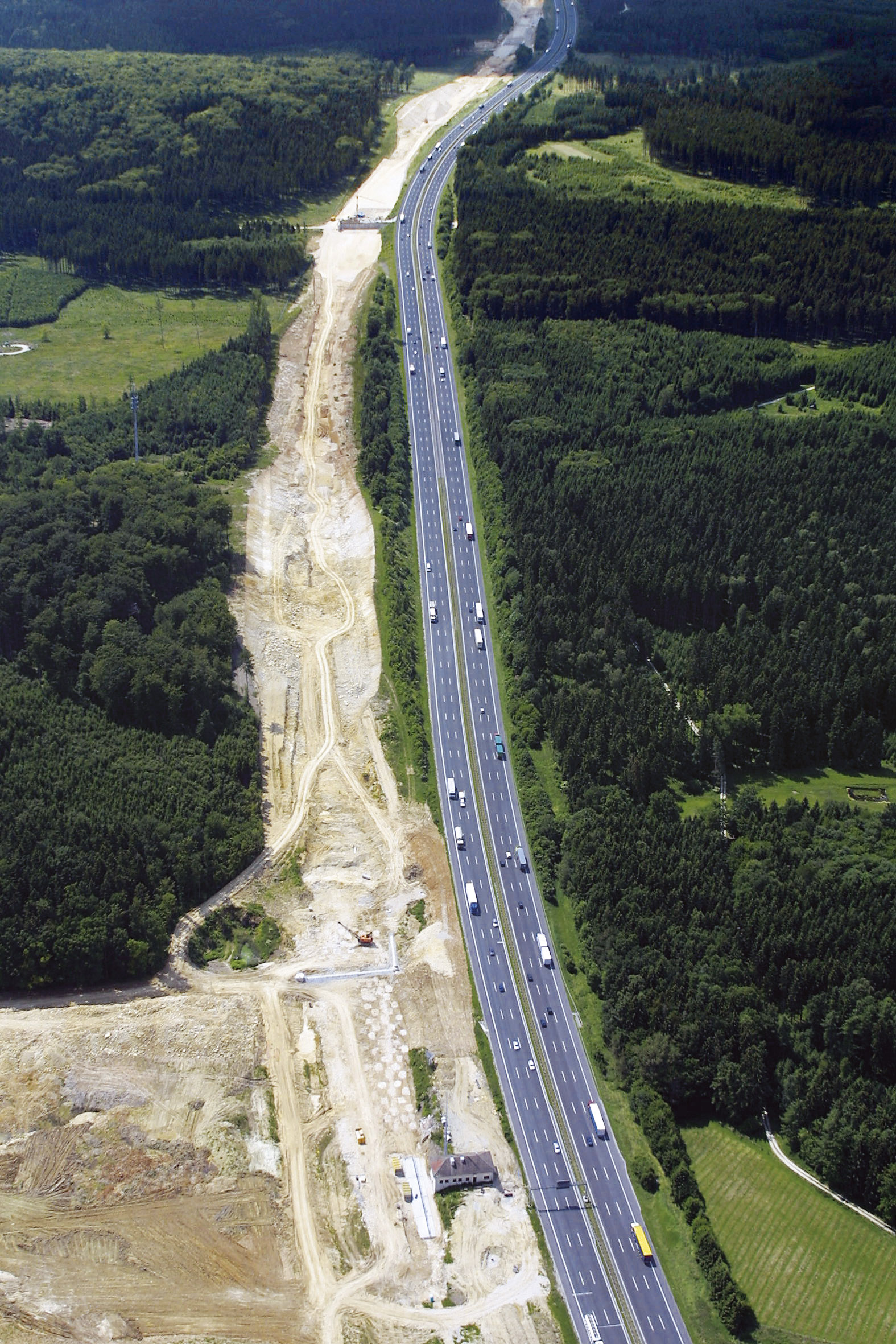
Construction of the route through the Kösching forest, north of Ingolstadt, Germany, had a large environmental footprint but with Road-Rail Parallel Layout this would be less than using multiple routes.

Road-Rail Parallel Layout is a design option to reduce the environmental effects of new transportation routes by locating railway tracks alongside a highway. In 1984 the Paris—Lyon high-speed rail route in France had about 14% parallel layout with the highway, and in 2002, 70% parallel layout was achieved with the Cologne–Frankfurt high-speed rail line.

Following the COVID-19 pandemic, the European Investment Bank Climate survey found that if travel restrictions were lifted, flying less frequently would become the norm.

Induced humidity and ventilation both can greatly dampen air pollution in enclosed spaces, which was found to be relatively high inside subway lines due to braking and friction and relatively less inside transit buses than lower sitting passenger automobiles or subways.

=== Involvement ===
Mitigation does not entirely involve large-scale changes such as road construction, but everyday people can contribute. Walking, cycling trips, short or non-commute trips, can be an alternate mode of transportation when travelling short or even long distances. A multi-modal trip involving walking, a bus ride, and bicycling may be counted solely as a transit trip. Economic evaluations of transportation investments often ignore the true effects of increased vehicular traffic—incremental parking, traffic accidents, and consumer costs—and the real benefits of alternative modes of transport. Most travel models do not account for the negative effects of additional vehicular traffic that result from roadway capacity expansion and overestimate the economic benefits of urban highway projects. Transportation planning indicators, such as average traffic speeds, congestion delays, and roadway level of service, measure mobility rather than accessibility.

Climate change is a factor that 67% of Europeans consider when choosing where to go on holiday. Specifically, people under the age of 30 are more likely to consider climate implications of travelling to vacation spots. 52% of young Europeans, 37% of people ages 30–64 and 25% of people aged above 65, state that in 2022 they will choose to travel by plane. 27% of young people claim they will travel to a faraway destination.

Europeans expect lifestyle changes to experience great transformation in the next 20 years. 31% of respondents to a climate survey conducted in 2021 believe that most people will no longer own their own vehicle, while 63% believe that teleworking will become the norm to reduce emissions and mitigate the effects of climate change. 48% predict that energy quotas will be individually assigned.

The European Investment Bank's Climate survey found that two-thirds of Europeans plan to sacrifice the trip of their dreams to reduce emissions and combat climate change.

== See also ==
- Bicycle commuting – Bicycling as transportation
- Carbon footprint – Concept for greenhouse gas emissions analysis
- Car-free movement – Movement to reduce the use of private vehicles
- Circular economy#Automotive industry – Production model to minimise wastage and emissions
- Durability – Ability of a product to continue to function
- Emission intensity – Emission rate of a pollutant
- Environmental effects of transport in Australia
- Externalities of automobiles – Impacts of car use
- Free public transport – Public transport not funded by fares from passengers
- Health impact of light rail systems
- List of most-polluted cities by particulate matter concentration
- Mobile source air pollution – Air pollution emitted by motor vehicles, airplanes, locomotives, and other engines
- Planned obsolescence – Product design with limited useful life
- Remote work – Employees working from any location
- Service life – Period of time where an object can fulfill a function
- Sustainable product – Environmentally-beneficial products
- Throwaway society – Human society strongly influenced by consumerism
- Vehicle recycling – Dismantling of vehicles for spare parts
