= Health and environmental effects of transport in Australia =

The environmental impact of transport in Australia have been reported in several research findings. Australia subsidizes fossil fuel energy, keeping prices artificially low and raising greenhouse gas emissions due to the increased use of fossil fuels as a result of the subsidies. The Australian Energy Regulator and state agencies, such as the New South Wales' Independent Pricing and Regulatory Tribunal, set and regulate electricity prices, which lower production and consumer cost.

== Subsidies ==
Subsidies are given in order to aid in the impact that fossil fuel is making on the environment. Australia actively participates in programs to decrease fossil fuel energy. The Greenhouse Gas Abatement Program (GGAP) subsidizes the coal power industries.

Direct financial transfers are the simplest type of subsidy to recognize. Governments normally declare these in yearly budget reports. They include rebates, direct subsidies, grants, or low-interest loans. Tax expenditures are incentives, rebates, exemptions, and benefits offered by the tax system. Energy related services are provided by the public service at lower than the actual cost. It includes government spending in energy infrastructure and services, public grants for studies conducted on energy-related subjects, and to run facilities and services that fall below reaching the supposed return on investment. Capital cost subsidies are interest rates, debts, and liability guarantees. Trade restrictions are restrictions on embargoes, quotas, and increased production costs. Energy sector regulation includes price controls, market protection policies, and demand guarantees.

The National Roads and Motorists' Association (NRMA) is pushing for Australian petrol consumption to be reduced by 50% by 2050. It is advocating a move towards greener transport and has called for a reduction of the A$10 billion subsidies given to the nation's fossil fuel industry.

== Research reports ==
=== "Energy and Transport Subsidies in Australia" ===
According to a report by The Institute for Sustainable Futures (ISF) at University of Technology Sydney, titled: "Energy and Transport Subsidies in Australia", roughly 70% of the country's greenhouse gas emissions are caused by the energy and transport industries. The uptake of renewable energy in these sectors is slow because of subsidies to fossil fuels and the high cost of acquiring the sophisticated technology required to produce cleaner fuels.

Furthermore, fossil fuels are easier to transport and use, compared to renewable energy, which often requires sophisticated instruments to acquire and store. The report revealed that for the 2005–2006 financial year, transport subsidies were measured to reach up to $10.1 billion, of which 74% related to transport, 18% to electricity, and 4% to renewable and efficient energy. These subsidies help energy generation companies increase their profits, therefore encouraging the building of additional coal-fuel power plants. Investing in other, more sustainable, types of electricity generation plants would have cost less than continuing to subsidize the building of these power plants. On a positive note, alternative transport fuels such as natural gas and liquefied petroleum gas are excused from fuel excise/tax.

=== "A Roadmap for Alternative Fuels in Australia" ===
The Jamison Report was published by the NRMA in July 2008, and focused on alternative fuels and reducing emissions from motor vehicles. It was written by the Jamison Group: CSIRO energy advisor David Lamb, University of New South Wales environmental science professor Mark Diesendorf, Macquarie University management professor John Mathews and Monash University Honorary Senior Research Fellow, Graeme Pearman. The report is titled: "A Roadmap for Alternative Fuels in Australia: Ending our Dependence on Oil".

The report suggests a 12-step 'roadmap' to address the issue of fossil fuel usage in motor vehicles. The goal is to reduce oil dependence in Australia by 20 percent by 2020; 30 percent by 2030; and by 50 percent by 2050. This would complement the National Emissions Trading Scheme. The roadmap begins desiring to promote and develop alternative fuels. Standards must then be set for compulsory fuel consumption and carbon dioxide, and further compulsory emissions standards. The roadmap continues to suggest alternative fuel market mandates.

According to the report, the targets are required to fuel the growth of investment in sustainable fuel industries and wrest the grip of the energy market away from the small group of large oil and coal companies that dominate the industry. The report states its desires to add tax incentives for vehicles running on alternative fuels or propulsion systems. It recommends tax incentives be given to producers of greener cars, and to consumers who purchase such vehicles. There is also the suggestion for tax incentives on alternative fuels and infrastructure. Tax intensives should be given to any establishment that comes up with clean fuels or constructs the infrastructure required to develop the industry.

The report continues to recommend to give exemptions to fuel tax for those who use alternative fuel. Wind back subsidies that reinforce oil dependence aid the $10 billion worth of subsidies handed out to producers and users of fossil-fuel transport fuel. The federal government's pre-election promise to provide a Green Car Fund for the country's motor industry. Here, the Group suggests that state governments adjust their taxes and tariffs. For example, consumers who drive vehicles that consume lesser amounts of fuel should be made to pay lower registration fees. Allow carbon credits to grow alternative fuel industries. The idea is that to encourage growth in the alternative fuels industry, the government should allow carbon credits to be awarded to players in that industry. The final step is to foster urban public transport and sustainable mobility options. Here, the group calls for improved public transport infrastructure and for better facilities for walking and cycling.

== See also ==
- Climate change in Australia
- Carbon Pollution Reduction Scheme
- Carbon capture and storage in Australia
- Effects of global warming on Australia
- Energy policy of Australia
- Feed-in tariffs in Australia
- Garnaut Climate Change Review
- Greenhouse Mafia
- Greenhouse Solutions with Sustainable Energy
- Mandatory renewable energy targets
- Mitigation of global warming in Australia
- New South Wales Greenhouse Gas Abatement Scheme
- Renewable energy in Australia
