= Monitoring of geological carbon dioxide storage =

Carbon dioxide (CO_{2}) from carbon capture and storage and direct air capture operations is often injected into deep geologic formations. These storage sites can be monitored for CO_{2} leakage. Monitoring can be done at both the surface and subsurface levels. The dominant monitoring technique is seismic imaging, where vibrations are generated that propagate through the subsurface. The geologic structure can be imaged from the refracted/reflected waves.

== Subsurface ==
Subsurface monitoring can directly and/or indirectly track the reservoir's status. One direct method involves drilling deep enough to collect a sample. This drilling can be expensive due to the rock's physical properties. It also provides data only at a specific location.

One indirect method sends sound or electromagnetic waves into the reservoir which reflects back for interpretation. This approach provides data over a much larger region; although with less precision.

Both direct and indirect monitoring can be done intermittently or continuously.

=== Seismic ===
Seismic monitoring is a type of indirect monitoring.

Examples of seismic monitoring of geological sequestration are the Sleipner sequestration project, the Frio CO_{2} injection test and the CO2CRC Otway Project. Seismic monitoring can confirm the presence of CO_{2} in a given region and map its lateral distribution, but is not sensitive to the concentration.

== Tracer ==
Organic chemical tracers, using no radioactive or Cadmium components, can be used during the injection phase in a CCS project where CO_{2} is injected into an existing oil or gas field, either for EOR, pressure support or storage. Tracers and methodologies are compatible with CO_{2} – and at the same time unique and distinguishable from the CO_{2} itself or other molecules present in the sub-surface. Using laboratory methodology with an extreme detectability for tracer, regular samples at the producing wells will detect if injected CO_{2} has migrated from the injection point to the producing well. Therefore, a small tracer amount is sufficient to monitor large scale subsurface flow patterns. For this reason, tracer methodology is well-suited to monitor the state and possible movements of CO_{2} in CCS projects. Tracers can therefore be an aid in CCS projects by acting as an assurance that CO_{2} is contained in the desired location sub-surface. In the past, this technology has been used to monitor and study movements in CCS projects in Algeria, the Netherlands and Norway (Snøhvit).

== Surface ==
This provides a measure of the vertical CO_{2} flux. Eddy covariance towers could potentially detect leaks, after accounting for the natural carbon cycle, such as photosynthesis and plant respiration. An example of eddy covariance techniques is the Shallow Release test. Another similar approach is to use accumulation chambers for spot monitoring. These chambers are sealed to the ground with an inlet and outlet flow stream connected to a gas analyzer. They also measure vertical flux. Monitoring a large site would require a network of chambers.

=== InSAR ===
Interferometric synthetic aperture radar (InSAR), is a radar technique used in geodesy and remote sensing.
