= Greenhouse gas emissions by Australia =

Release of gases from Australia which contribute to global warming

Australian Greenhouse Gas Emissions by Source Sector (Sept. 2023)
1. Electricity (28.3%)
2. Stationary energy (19.5%)
3. Transport (18.5%)
4. Fugitive emissions (9.00%)
5. Industrial processes (6.30%)
6. Agriculture (15.6%)
7. Waste (2.60%)

Emissions of carbon dioxide, a greenhouse gas, per capita by country

Greenhouse gas emissions by Australia totalled 533 million tonnes CO_{2}-equivalent based on greenhouse gas national inventory report data for 2019; representing per capita CO_{2}e emissions of 21 tons, three times the global average. Coal was responsible for 30% of emissions. The national Greenhouse Gas Inventory estimates for the year to March 2021 were 494.2 million tonnes, which is 27.8 million tonnes, or 5.3%, lower than the previous year. It is 20.8% lower than in 2005 (the baseline year for the Paris Agreement). According to the government, the result reflects the decrease in transport emissions due to COVID-19 pandemic restrictions, reduced fugitive emissions, and reductions in emissions from electricity; however, there were increased greenhouse gas emissions from the land and agriculture sectors.

Australia uses principally coal power for electricity, accounting for 66% of grid-connected electricity generation in 2020, but this is rapidly decreasing with a growing share of renewables making up the energy supply mix, and most existing coal-fired power station scheduled to cease operation between 2022 and 2048. Emissions by the country have started to fall and are expected to continue to fall in coming years as more renewable projects come online.

Climate Action Tracker rates Australia's overall commitment to emissions reduction as "insufficient". Policies and action is "insufficient", domestic target is "almost sufficient", fair share target is "insufficient", and climate finance is "critically insufficient". This is because the Australian government has continued to invest in natural gas projects, refused to increase its 2030 domestic emissions target, and is not on track to meet its current target.

Climate change in Australia is caused by greenhouse gas emissions, and the country is generally becoming hotter, and more prone to extreme heat, bushfires, droughts, floods and longer fire seasons because of climate change. As of 2024, the emissions totaled to 378.73 million tons

== Contribution ==
=== Total contributions ===
The Australian government calculates that Australia's net emissions (including Land use, land-use change, and forestry) for the 12-month period to September 2020 were 510.10 million tons CO_{2}-equivalent. The sectoral contributions based on the IPCC Fifth Assessment Report metrics were as follows: electricity 170.36Mt, 33.4%; stationary energy (excluding electricity) 101.83Mt, 20.%; transport 89.83Mt, 17.6%; agriculture 72.04Mt, 14.1%; fugitive emissions 51.23Mt, 10.0%; industrial processes 30.29Mt, 5.9%; waste 13.28Mt, 2.6%, and LULUCF -18.76Mt, -3.7% (due to carbon sequestration).

In 2017, the electricity sector emissions totaled 190 million tons, of which 20 million tons was for primary industry, 49 million tons for manufacturing (which might include aluminum smelting), 51 million tons Commercial, Construction and Transport, and 33 million tons Residential.

The Australian National Greenhouse Gas Inventory (NGGI) indicated in 2006 that the energy sector accounts for 69% of Australia's emissions, agriculture 16 per cent and LULUCF six per cent. Since 1990, however, emissions from the energy sector have increased 35% (stationary energy up 43% and transport up 23%). By comparison, emissions from LULUCF have fallen by 73%. However, questions have been raised about the veracity of the estimates of emissions from the LULUCF sector because of discrepancies between the Australian Federal and Queensland Governments’ land clearing data. Data published by the Statewide Landcover and Trees Study (SLATS) in Queensland, for example, show that the total amount of land clearing in Queensland identified under SLATS between 1989/90 and 2000/01 is approximately 50% higher than the amount estimated by the Australian Federal Government’s National Carbon Accounting System (NCAS) between 1990 and 2001.

=== Cumulative historical contribution ===
The World Resources Institute estimates that Australia was responsible for 1.1% of all CO_{2} emissions between 1850 and 2002. Consolidated historical data measures Australia's total fossil fuels and cement production emissions (excluding LULUCF) at 18.18 billion tons out of the world's 1.65 trillion tons, or 1.10%. However noting that Australia has significant negative emissions from LULUCF relative to other countries, it is likely the net cumulative contribution proportion of Australia is much lower.

=== Projected contribution ===
According to the no-mitigation scenario in the Garnaut Climate Change Review, Australia's share of world emissions, at 1.5% in 2005, will decline to 1.1% by 2030, and to 1% by 2100.

=== Responsibility ===
Cumulative (since 1850) and projected (2030) national and regional contributions to greenhouse gas emissions

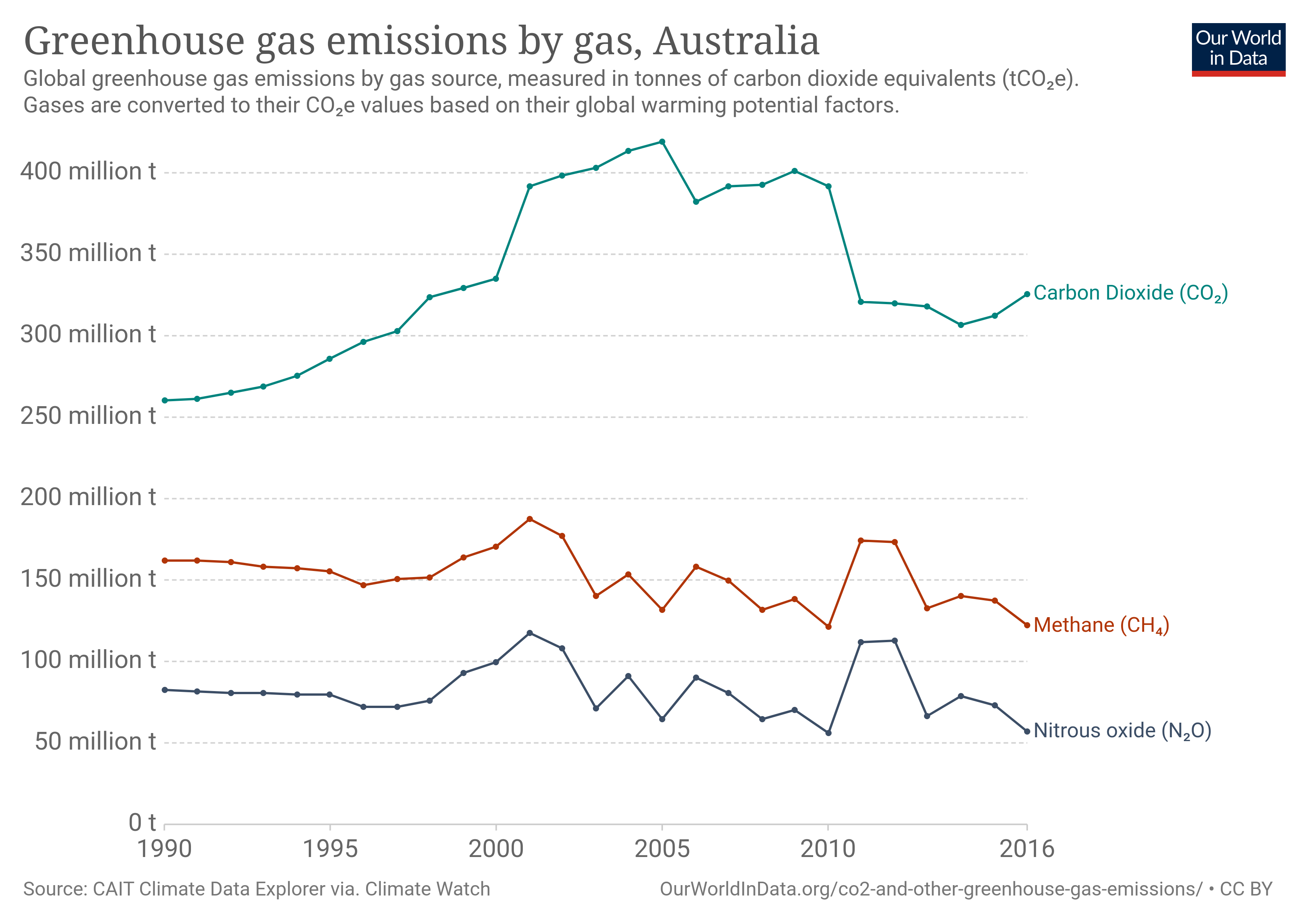
Australia greenhouse emission of gas from 1990 - 2016

According to the polluter pays principle, the polluter has ecological and financial responsibility for the climate change consequences. The climate change is caused cumulatively and today's emissions will have effect for decades forward.

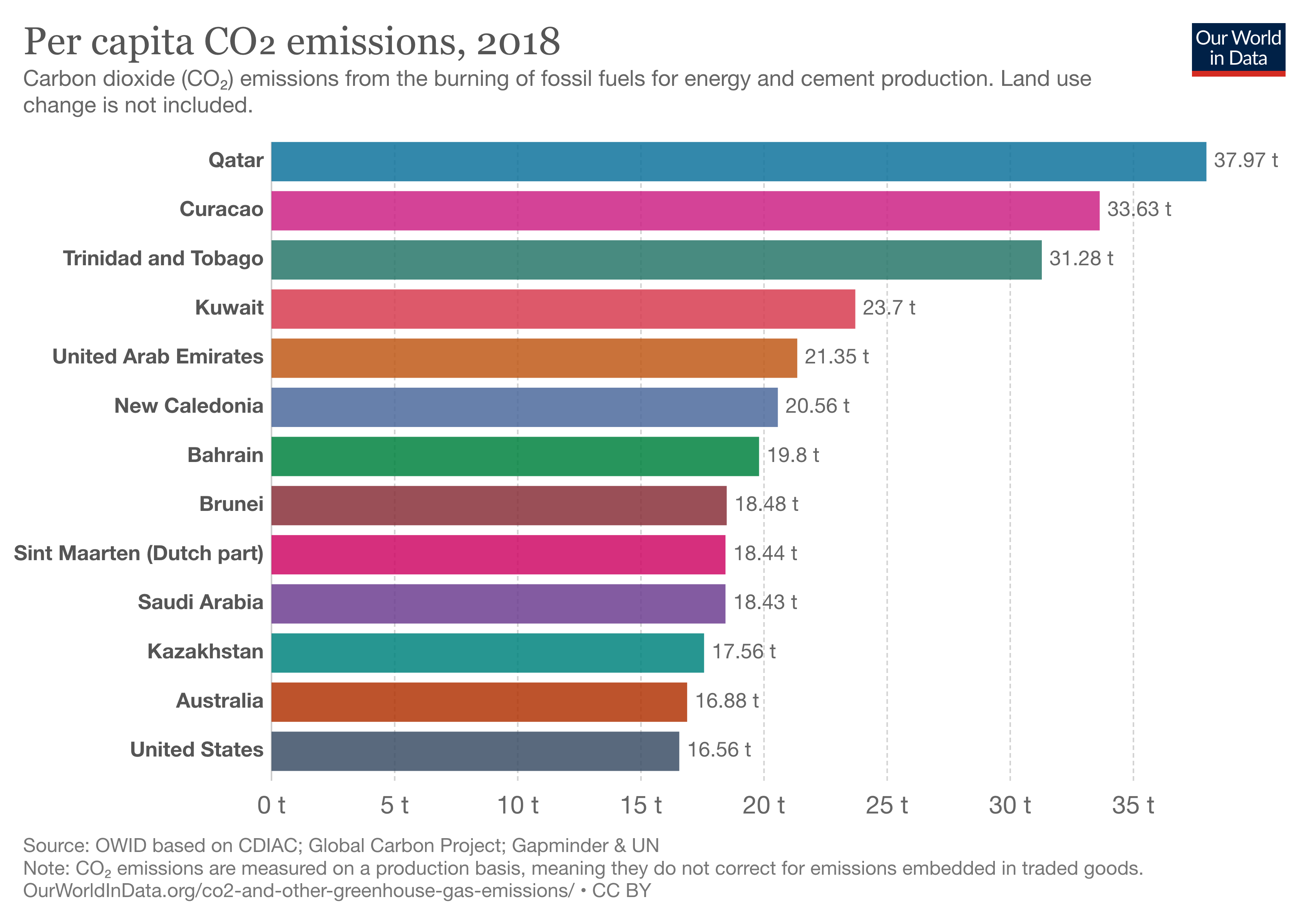
CO_{2} emissions per capita from 2018

The CO_{2} emissions per capita was 15.22-15.37 tons in 2020, which made Australia the 11th largest CO2 emissions per capita just ahead of the United Arab Emirates and United States.(Citation 15 does not match new data)

Some of the reasons for Australia's high levels of emissions include:

- In 2020, 73.5% of electricity was generated from fossil fuels (66% of electricity was generated from coal, and 7.5% from gas).
- A warm climate results in high use of air conditioning.
- Agriculture, such as methane from sheep and cow belches.
- High levels of automobile and aeroplane use among the population.
- Continued deforestation.

=== Production and export of carbon products ===
Australian emissions are monitored on a production rather than a consumption basis. This means that the emissions from the manufacture of goods imported into and consumed within Australia, for example many motor vehicles, are allocated to the country of manufacture. Similarly, Australia produces aluminium for export, which emits carbon dioxide during refining. While the aluminium is mainly consumed overseas, the emissions of its production are allocated to Australia.

==== Coal ====
In 2018, Australia was the world's 2nd largest exporter of coal. Australia is the world's largest exporter of metallurgical coal accounting for 55% of the world's supply in 2019.

==== LNG ====
Australia became the world's largest exporter of liquefied natural gas in 2020.

List of known high Emissions Sources

This is a list of known high Emissions sources. The list is dominated by mines (many are a source for local Power Stations) because of their high emissions identified by carbonmapper.org. Other known high emission sources include fossil fuelled power stations: List of power stations in New South Wales.

Source	City	Location	Reference
Mandalong Coal Mine	Mandalong, New South Wales, Australia	http://maps.google.com/maps?t=k&q=loc:-33.11393463733301+151.46079478074444	
Coal Mine Exhaust	Chain Valley Bay, New South Wales, Australia	http://maps.google.com/maps?t=k&q=loc:-33.15102397528699+151.5698602034713	
Bulga Coal Mine	Mount Thorley, New South Wales, Australia	http://maps.google.com/maps?t=k&q=loc:-32.685668923534294+151.0756835796241	
Bulga Coal Mine	Bulga, New South Wales, Australia	http://maps.google.com/maps?t=k&q=loc:-32.63034639600391+151.054209955296	
Ashton Coal Mine	Camberwell, New South Wales, Australia	http://maps.google.com/maps?t=k&q=loc:-32.46873908543299+151.07423446418647	
Tahmoor Coal Mine	Tahmoor, New South Wales, Australia	http://maps.google.com/maps?t=k&q=loc:-34.244749316628365+150.60419492860012	
Appin Coal Mine	Appin, New South Wales, Australia	http://maps.google.com/maps?t=k&q=loc:-34.207901055070614+150.77027617480553	
Appin Coal Mine	Douglas Park, New South Wales, Australia	http://maps.google.com/maps?t=k&q=loc:-34.181155925510744+150.72023243342824	
Bluewaters Mine and Powerstation	Palmer, Western Australia, Australia	http://maps.google.com/maps?t=k&q=loc:-33.33194548109565+116.22761312305147	
Boddington Gold Mine	Bannister, Western Australia, Australia	http://maps.google.com/maps?t=k&q=loc:-32.75757476415293+116.36349733672625	
Barrow Island Gorgon LPG Plant	Barrow Island, Western Australia, Australia	http://maps.google.com/maps?t=k&q=loc:-20.786140370459066+115.44722003767538	
Yara Pilbara Fertilisers	Burrup, Western Australia, Australia	http://maps.google.com/maps?t=k&q=loc:-20.62589156859967+116.78011901633477	
Moomba Gas and Oil Fields	Gidgealpa, South Australia, Australia	http://maps.google.com/maps?t=k&q=loc:-28.112421691583176+140.2060700836777	
Grosvenor Coal Mine	Moranbah, Queensland, Australia	http://maps.google.com/maps?t=k&q=loc:-21.88797568306518+147.9952562451636	
Grasstree Mine	Bundoora, Queensland, Australia	http://maps.google.com/maps?t=k&q=loc:-22.989010612261975+148.58061868759995	
Coal Mine	Crinum, Queensland, Australia	http://maps.google.com/maps?t=k&q=loc:-23.299667785766914+148.32315704897331	

== Mitigation (technology aspects) ==
Mitigation of global warming involves taking actions to reduce greenhouse gas emissions and to enhance sinks aimed at reducing the extent of global warming. This is in distinction to adaptation to global warming, which involves taking action to minimize the effects of global warming. Scientific consensus on global warming, together with the precautionary principle and the fear of non-linear climate transitions, is leading to increased effort to develop new technologies and sciences and carefully manage others in an attempt to mitigate global warming.

In order to make a significant change, coal from Australia needs to be replaced with alternatives.

Carbon capture and storage in Australia has been put forward as a solution for production of clean hydrogen from natural gas. Following the introduction of government mandatory renewable energy targets, more opportunities have opened up for renewable energy technologies such as wind power, photovoltaics, and solar thermal technologies. Accelerating deployment of these technologies provides opportunities for mitigating greenhouse gases.

A carbon price was introduced in 2012 by the government of Julia Gillard with the purpose of reducing Australia's carbon emissions. It required large businesses (defined as those with annual carbon dioxide equivalent emissions over 25,000 tonnes annually) to pay a price for emissions permits. The tax was scrapped by the Abbott government in 2014 in what was a widely criticised and highly publicized move.

=== Coal ===
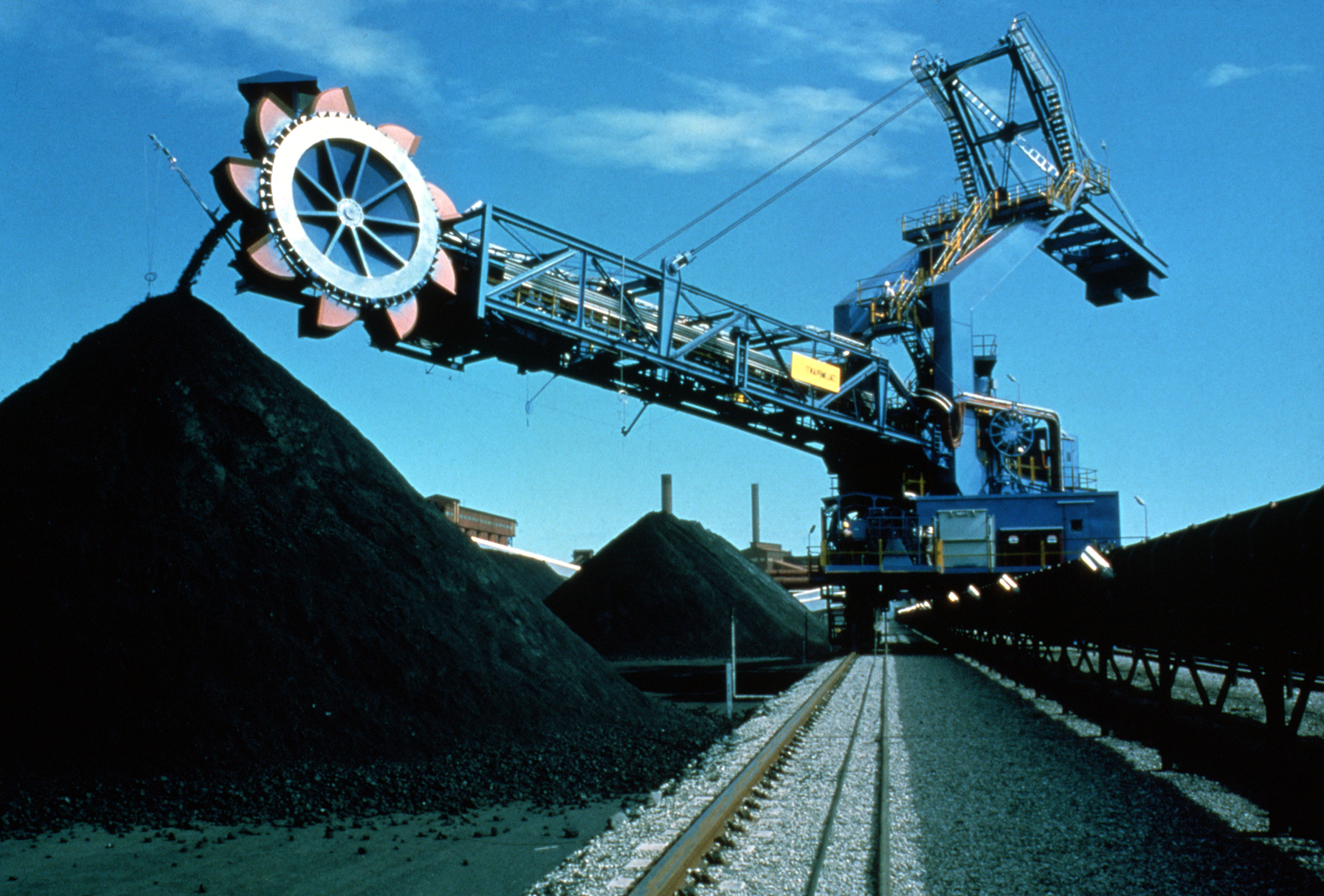
Coal in Australia is a large emitter.

Coal is the most polluting of all fossil fuels, and the single greatest threat to the climate. Every stage of coal use brings substantial environmental damage. Phasing out fossil fuel energy is one of the most important elements to climate change mitigation. Today coal supplies over one third of the Australia's energy. Brown coal is by far the most polluting, and is currently used in Victoria. In order to have significant effects on greenhouse gas emissions, there needs to be a replacement of coal with alternatives.

Reduction in the mining, use and export of coal is favored by environmental groups such as Greenpeace. Almost all of the coal emissions were emitted by coal fired power stations. Coal was responsible for 30% (164 million tonnes) of Australia's greenhouse gas emissions, not counting methane and export coal, based on 2019 GHG inventory.

Two forms of coal are mined in Australia, depending on the region: high quality black coal and lower quality brown coal. Black coal is mainly found in Queensland and New South Wales, and is used for both domestic power generation and for export overseas. It is normally mined underground before being transported to power stations, or export shipping terminals. Brown coal is mainly found in Victoria and South Australia, and is of lower quality due a higher ash and water content. Today there are three open cut brown coal mines in Victoria used for baseload power generation.

=== Carbon capture and storage ===
The Rudd-Gillard government stated support for research into carbon capture and storage CCS as a possible solution to rising greenhouse gas emissions. CCS is an integrated process, made up of three distinct parts: carbon capture, transport, and storage (including measurement, monitoring and verification). Capture technology aims to produce a concentrated stream of CO_{2} that can be compressed, transported, and stored. Transport of captured CO_{2} to storage locations is most likely to be via pipeline. Storage of the captured carbon is the final part of the process. The vast majority of CO_{2} storage is expected to occur in geological sites on land, or below the seabed.

However, according to the Greenpeace False Hope Report, CCS cannot deliver in time to avoid a dangerous increase in world temperatures.

The Report also states that CCS wastes energy, and uses between 10 and 40% of the energy produced by a power station. It also asserts that CCS is expensive, potentially doubling plant costs, and is very risky, as permanent storage cannot be guaranteed.

=== Nuclear energy ===
Australia has approximately 40% of the world's uranium deposits, and is the world's third largest producer of uranium. Life-cycle greenhouse-gas emissions from nuclear power are low.

The only nuclear reactor in Australia is currently operated by ANSTO in the Sydney suburb of Lucas Heights. The main argument against building more is that the cost of electricity from new nuclear is more expensive than new solar power. Other perceived problems include that enriched uranium can also be used as a nuclear weapon, prompting security issues such as nuclear proliferation. Also, nuclear waste requires extensive waste management because it can remain radioactive for centuries.

=== Renewable energy ===
Renewable energy technologies currently contribute about 6.2% of Australia's total energy supply and 21.3% of Australia's electricity supply, with hydro-electricity the largest single contributor and wind power a close second. Initiatives are also being taken with ethanol fuel and geothermal energy exploration.

==== Renewable energy targets ====
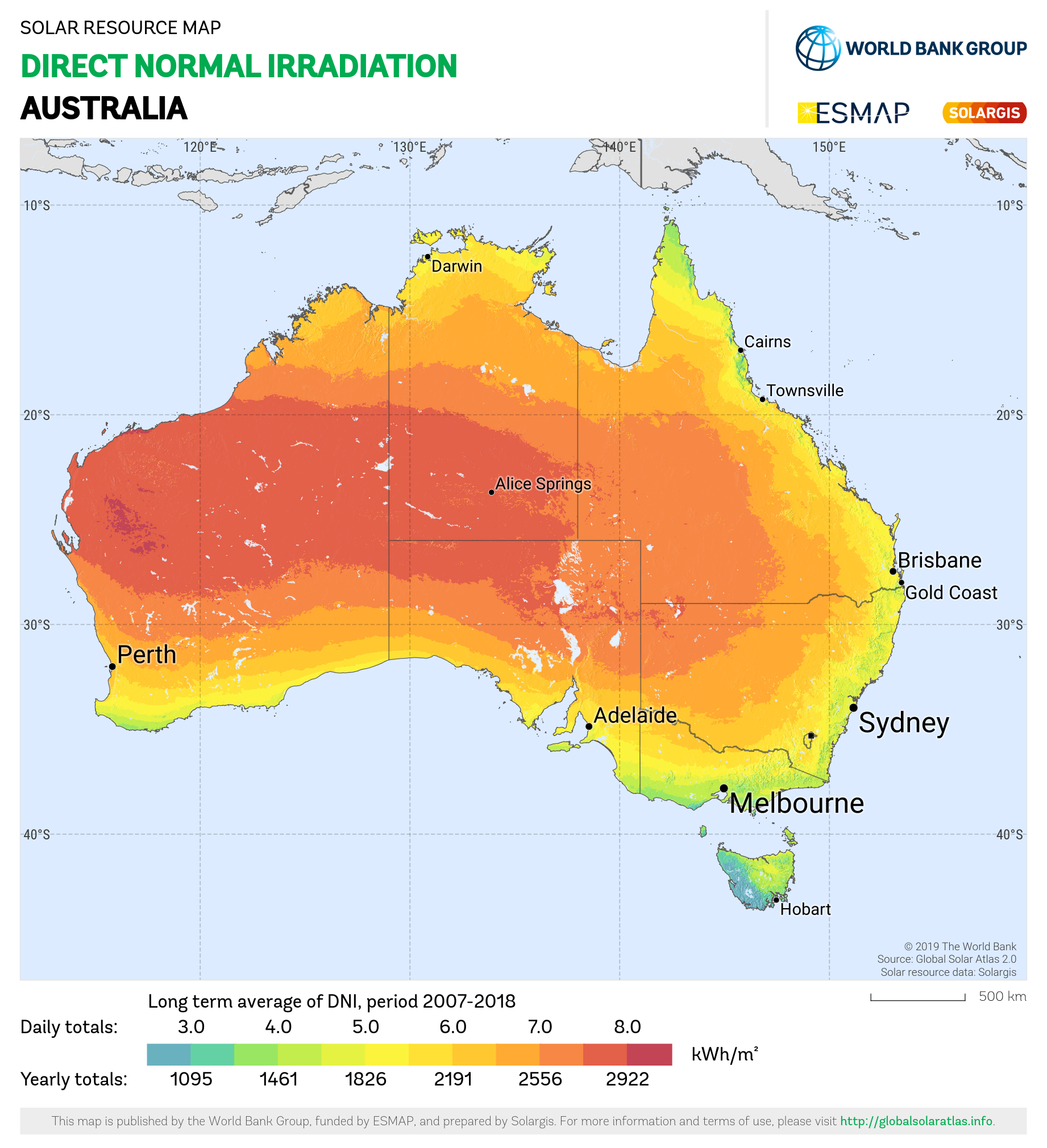
Vast solar potential is little used except on rooftops.

Moving towards long-term mitigation policies is a requirement of government, and the Australian energy sectors remains a central area in national emissions. The International Energy Agency (IEA) reviewed the Australian energy sectors policies in 2018, the findings identified needed improvements to the country's emissions reduction targets, and further the energy sectors resilience. The IEA identified needed improvements in government leadership by establishing a well-defined long-term integrated energy policy and climate toolkit for policy development and deployment.

The Australian Government has announced a mandatory renewable energy target (MRET) to ensure that renewable energy obtains a 20% share of electricity supply in Australia by 2020. To ensure this, the government has committed that the MRET will increase from 9,500 gigawatt-hours to 45,000 gigawatt-hours by 2020. After 2020, the proposed ETS and improved efficiencies from innovation and in manufacture are expected to allow the MRET to be phased out by 2030.

Following the introduction of government Mandatory Renewable Energy Targets, more opportunities have opened up for renewable energies such as wind power, photovoltaics, and solar thermal technologies. The deployment of these technologies provides opportunities for mitigating greenhouse gases.

==== Solar power ====
By 2020 installed solar power by country was more in each of Italy, Japan and Germany than Australia despite their lower potentials.

==== Wind power ====
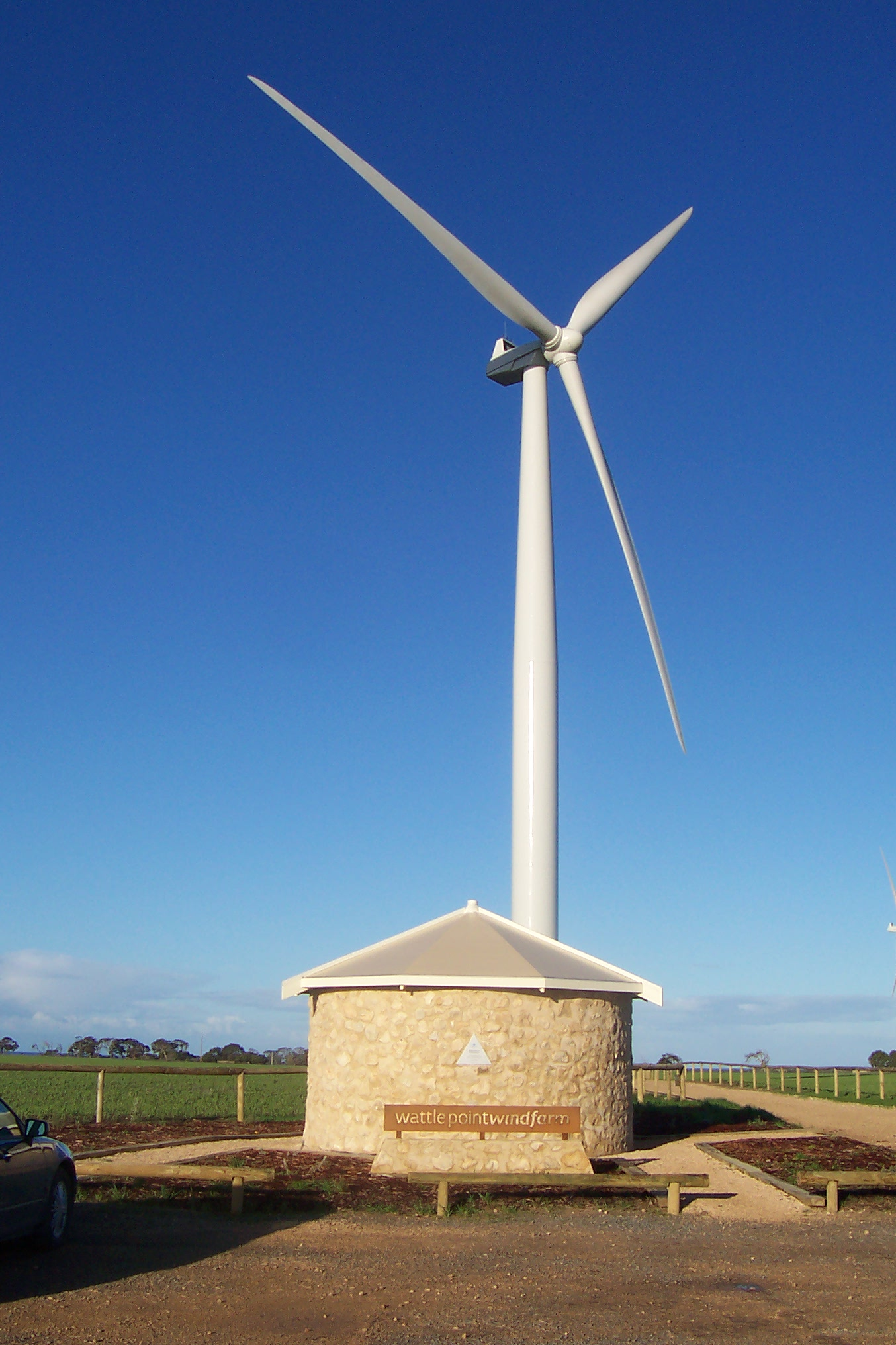
The information centre near the base of one of the towers at Wattle Point Wind Farm

Wind farms are highly compatible with agricultural and pastoral land use.

==== Bioenergy ====
Bioenergy is energy produced from biomass. Biomass is material produced by photosynthesis, or is an organic by-product from a waste stream. Thus it can be seen as stored solar energy. In terms of reducing greenhouse gas emissions, biomass offers four different types of contribution:

- liquid and gaseous biofuels can substitute for oil in transportation;
- biomass can be used in place of many greenhouse intensive materials;
- biomass can be converted to biochar, an organic char coal that greatly enhances the ability of soil to sequester carbon.

Sustainable energy expert Mark Diesendorf suggests that bioenergy could produce 39% of Australia's electricity generation.

==== Solar heat and electricity ====
Solar heat and electricity together have the potential for supplying all of Australia's energy, whilst using less than 0.1% of land. With suitable government policies, particularly at the state and local levels, solar hot water could cost-effectively provide the vast majority of hot water systems in Australia, and make considerable reductions in residential electricity consumption. Solar electricity's potential scale of application is huge and its prospects for further substantial cost reductions are excellent.

=== Energy efficiency ===
The most important energy saving options include improved thermal insulation and building design, super efficient electrical machines and drives, and a reduction in energy consumption by vehicles used for goods and passenger traffic. Industrialized countries such as Australia, which currently use energy in the least efficient way, can reduce their consumption drastically without the loss of either housing comfort or amenity. Increased energy efficiency of buildings had the support of the former leader of the federal opposition, Malcolm Turnbull.

=== Energy storage ===
Hydrogen may become an important export.

=== Biochar ===
Biochar has been promoted as a technique for mitigation of global warming. The former leader of the federal opposition, and future prime minister, Malcolm Turnbull brought biochar into the political debate by announcing that burying agricultural waste was one of three under-invested areas that his mitigation strategy was committed to opening up.

Publications and interest groups which track the fledgling Australian industry are divided over the suitability of biochar to the economy. Brian Toohey of The Australian Financial Review has said it is yet to be proven commercially viable. Friends of the Earth Australia, one of the larger environmental lobby groups, is fundamentally opposed to biochar, calling it "part of a series of false solutions to climate change" which will be "based on large-scale industrial plantations and will lead to the acquisition of large tracts of land, furthering the erosion of indigenous peoples' and community rights while not adequately addressing the climate crisis".

Green Left Weekly has published several editorials supporting the development of a large-scale biochar industry.

=== Reforestation ===
Reforestation programs have adaptation and mitigation strategy overlap, and in 2014, the "20 million Trees Programme" was announced as a national strategy. The plan aimed to further native resilience against climatic changes by creating a self-sustaining tree-based ecosystem by planting 20 million native trees across Australia by 2020. The Programme falls under the authority of the Australian Government's National Landcare Programme. Increasing the coverage of flora range has the potential and capability to increase the habitability potential of areas threatened by climatic change and improve ecological communities that may be threatened or endangered.

The Commonwealth government announced a plan in 2019 which would invest in Australia's forestry industry by planting 1 billion trees in nine forestry hubs throughout Australia by 2030. Land management and biodiversity programs have emissions reduction benefits to both agricultural and environmental. Advantages stem from the land's ability to adapt to climatic changes by helping to fight soil erosion and stabilize soil as well as providing shelter to native and agricultural animals. AUD 1 billion will be invested the National Landcare program between 2018 and 2019 and 2022–23.

== Mitigation (policy aspects) ==
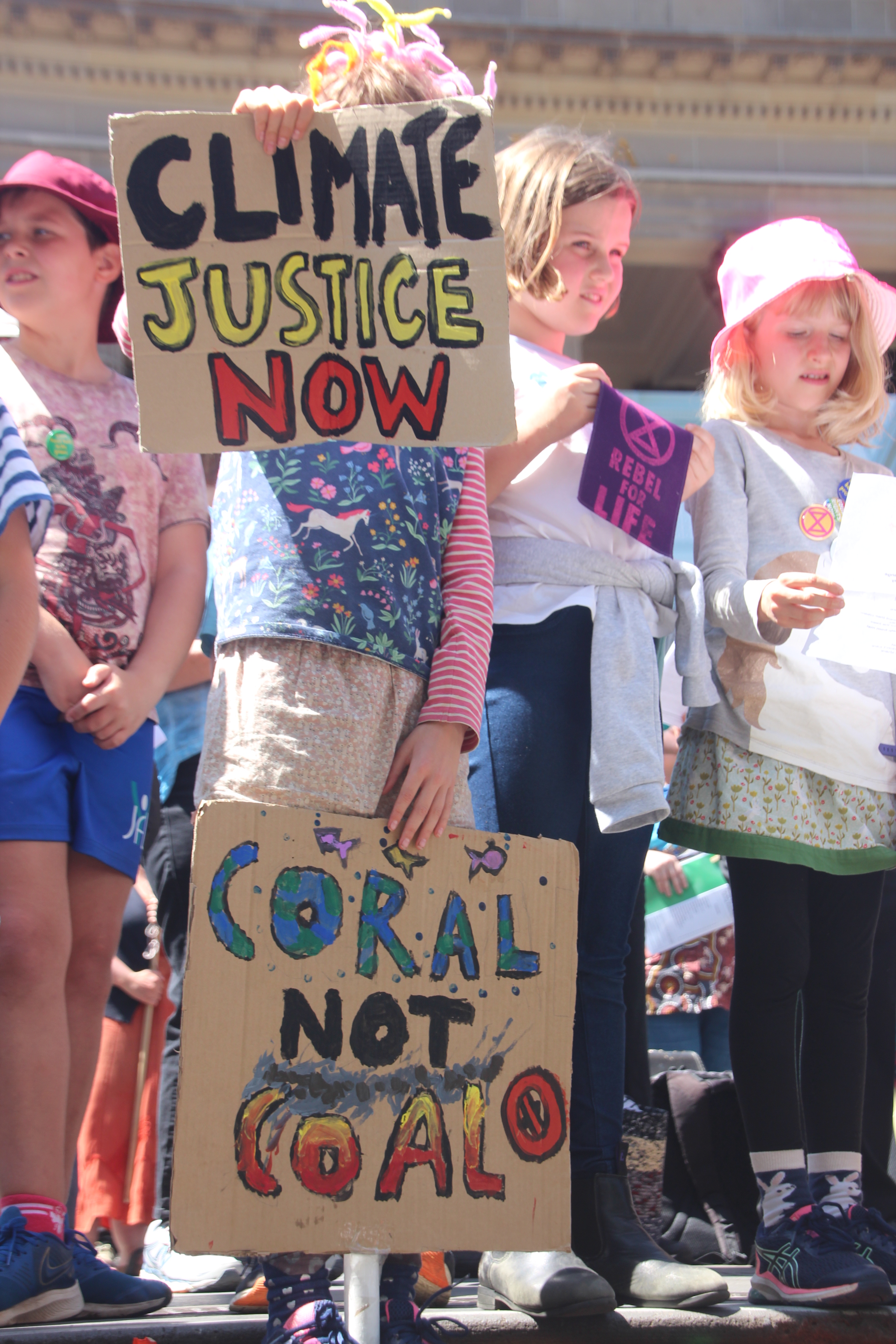
Coal policy is controversial.

The economic impact of a 60% reduction of emissions by 2050 was modeled in 2006 in a study commissioned by the Australian Business Roundtable on Climate Change. The World Resources Institute identifies policy uncertainty and over-reliance on international markets as the top threats to Australia's GHG mitigation.

=== Domestic ===
After contributing to the development of, then signing but not ratifying the Kyoto Protocol, action to address climate change was coordinated through the Australian Greenhouse Office. The Australian Greenhouse Office released the National Greenhouse Strategy in 1998. The report recognized climate change was of global significance and that Australia had an international obligation to address the problem. In 2000 the Senate Environment, Communications, Information Technology and the Arts References Committee conducted an inquiry that produced The Heat is On: Australia's Greenhouse Future.

One of Australia's first national attempt to reduce emissions was the voluntary-based initiative called the Greenhouse Challenge Program which began in 1995. A collection of measures which focused on reducing the environmental impacts of the energy sector were released by Prime Minister John Howard on 20 November 1997 in a policy statement called Safeguarding Our Future: Australia's Response to Climate Change. One measure was the establishment of the Australian Greenhouse Office, which was set up as the world's first dedicated greenhouse office in April 1998.

Domestically, the Clean Energy Act 2011 addresses GHG with an emissions cap, carbon price, and subsidies. Emissions by the electric sector are addressed by Renewable Energy targets at multiple scales, Australian Renewable Energy Agency (ARENA), Clean Energy Finance Corporation (CEFC), carbon capture and storage flagships, and feed-in tariffs on solar panels. Emissions by the industrial sector are addressed by the Energy Efficiency Opportunities (EEO) program. Emissions by the building sector are addressed by building codes, minimum energy performance standards, Commercial Building Disclosure program, state energy-saving obligations, and the National Energy Saving Initiative. Emissions by the transportation sector are addressed by reduced fuel tax credits and vehicle emissions performance standards. Emissions by the agricultural sector are addressed by the Carbon Farming Initiative and state land-clearing laws. Emissions by the land use sector are addressed by the Clean Energy Future Package, which consists of the Carbon Farming Futures program, Diversity Fund, Regional Natural Resources Management Planning for Climate Change Fund, Indigenous Carbon Farming Fund, Carbon Pollution Reduction Scheme (CPRS), and Carbon Farming Skills program. State energy saving schemes vary by state, with the Energy Saving Scheme (ESS) in North South Wales, Residential Energy Efficiency Scheme (REES) in South Australia, Energy Saver Incentive Scheme (ESI) in Victoria, and Energy Efficiency Improvement Scheme (EEIS) in Australian Capital Territory.

=== Net Zero ===
Labor and the Greens support net zero by 2050.

On 2 November 2025, The National Party of Australia abandoned its support for net zero by 2050.

On 13 November 2025, The Liberal Party of Australia abandoned its support for net zero by 2050.

=== Carbon taxation ===
Another method of mitigation of global warming considered by the Australian Government is a carbon tax. This method would involve imposing an additional tax on the use of fossil fuels to generate energy. Compared to the CPRS and CTS/ETS, a carbon tax would set the cost for all carbon emissions, while the cap itself would be left unattended, allowing free market movements.

This tax would primarily be aimed to reduce the use of fossil fuels for energy generation, and also look to increase efficient energy use and increase demand for alternative energies.

A carbon tax was introduced by the government of Julia Gillard on 1 July 2012. It requires businesses emitting over 25,000 tonnes of carbon dioxide equivalent emissions annually to purchase emissions permits, which initially cost A$23 for one tonne of CO_{2} equivalent. The tax was repealed by the Australian senate on 17 July 2014. The reason given for the repeal by Australia's 2014 prime minister Tony Abbot was that the tax cost jobs and increased energy prices. Opponents to the repeal say that there has been an increase in Australian pollution since the tax's repeal. Since the repeal there has been several calls to re-implement the tax from multiple public figures, including Woodside Petroleum CEO Peter Coleman.

=== Carbon Trading and Emission Trading Scheme ===
In June 2007, former Australian Prime Minister, John Howard, announced that Australia would adopt a Carbon Trading Scheme by 2012. The scheme was expected to be the same as the counterpart in United States and European Union using carbon credits, where businesses must purchase a license in order to generate pollution.

The scheme received broad criticism from both the ALP and Greens. The ALP believed that the scheme was too weak as well as a bad political move by the government. The lack of clear target by the government for this scheme before the 2007 federal election produced a high degree of skepticism on the willingness of the government on mitigation of global warming in Australia.

In March 2008, the newly elected Labor government of Prime Minister Kevin Rudd announced that the Carbon Pollution Reduction Scheme (a cap-and-trade emissions trading system) would be introduced in 2010, however this scheme was initially delayed by a year to mid-2011, and subsequently delayed further until 2013.

In April 2010, Kevin Rudd announced the delay the CPRS until after the commitment period of the Kyoto Protocol, which ends in 2012. Reasons given were the lack of bipartisan support for the CPRS and slow international progress on climate action for the delay.

The Federal Opposition strongly criticised the delay as did community and grassroots action groups such as GetUp.

=== Pathways for climate change mitigation ===
==== Greenpeace energy revolution ====
Greenpeace calls for a complete energy revolution. There are some fundamental aspects to this revolution, aimed as changing the way that energy is produced, distributed and consumed. The five principles of this revolution are:

- implement renewable solutions, especially through decentralized energy systems;
- respect the natural limits of the environment;
- phase out dirty, unsustainable energy sources;
- create greater equity in the use of resources;
- decouple economic growth from the consumption of fossil fuels.

Other goals of the energy revolution are:

- renewable energy: 40% of electricity provided by renewable sources by 2020;
- coal-fired power will be phased out entirely by 2030;
- using electricity for the transport system and cutting consumption of fossil fuels through efficiency.

The energy revolution report also looks at policy suggestions for the Australian Government in regards to climate change. Policy suggestions of the report include:

- legislate a greenhouse gas reduction target of greater than 40% below 1990 levels by 2020;
- establish an emissions trading scheme that delivers a decrease of our emissions in line with legislated interim targets;
- legislate a national target for 40% of electricity to be generated by renewable energy sources by 2020;
- massively invest in the deployment of renewable energy and strongly regulate for energy efficiency measures;
- establish an immediate moratorium on new coal-fired power stations and extensions to existing coal-fired power stations, and phase out existing coal-fired power stations in Australia by 2030;
- set a target of 2% per year to reduce Australia's primary energy demand;
- ensure transitional arrangements for coal dependent communities that might be affected by the transition to a clean energy economy;
- redirect all public subsidies that encourage the use and production of fossil fuels towards implementing energy efficiency programs, deploying renewable energy and supporting the upgrading of public transport infrastructure;
- develop a highly trained “green” workforce through investment in training programs and apprenticeships.

==== Climate Code Red: The case for a sustainability emergency ====
Climate Code Red states that the key strategies for cutting greenhouse gas emissions to zero are resource efficiency backed up by the substitution of renewable energy for fossil fuel sources. The report sites ultra-efficient technologies and synergies, and wind power as ways in which to tackle the climate change problem within Australia.

Climate Code Red also has an outline for a rapid transition to a safe-climate economy. This plan includes:

- having the building capacity to plan, coordinate and allocate resources for high priority infrastructure projects and to invest sufficiently in the means to make safe-climate producer and consumer goods;
- fostering research and innovation to produce, develop and scale up the necessary technologies, products and processes;
- national building and industry energy efficiency programmes, including mandatory and enforceable minimum standards for domestic and commercial buildings, and the allocation of public resources to help householders, especially those with limited financial capacity, to reduce energy use;
- the rapid construction of capacity across a range of renewable technologies at both a national and micro level to produce sufficient electricity to allow the closure of the fossil fuel-fired generating industry;
- the conversion and expansion of Australia's car industry to manufacture zero-emission vehicles for public and private transport;
- the renewal and electrification of national and regional train networks to provide the capacity to shift all long-distance freight from road and air to rail;

Further information: High-speed rail in Australia

- providing safe-climate expertise, technologies, goods and services to less developed nations to support their transition to the post-carbon world;
- adjustment and reskilling programmes for workers, communities and industries affected by the impacts of global warming and by the transition to the new economy.

==== Climate Change Authority review ====
The Australian Climate Change Authority made recommendations to the Commonwealth government in 2016 to develop a toolkit of policies to guide the country into the future, the focal point for the 'toolkit' is Australia's Paris Agreement obligations. In 2017, the Commonwealth government commissioned an effectiveness' assessment of emissions reductions policies to meet its Paris Agreement obligations by 2030. The results of the evaluation were to develop both adaptation and mitigation measure which would cover all sectors of the economy, under the Paris Agreement these measure fall under "ratchet mechanism". To meet the 2030 Paris Agreements 2 °C limit of global median temperature rise a five-year review and adjustment cycle will commence beginning in 2023.

=== Timeline of major Australian climate and mitigation policy developments (1992–2025) ===
Year	Event	Source
1992	Australia signs the UN Framework Convention on Climate Change (UNFCCC) at the Rio Earth Summit.	
1997	Australia signs the Kyoto Protocol; policy debates continue about ratification and targets.	
1998	Australian Greenhouse Office established as a dedicated federal climate agency.	
2007	Rudd government establishes Department of Climate Change and ratifies Kyoto Protocol.	
2011	Clean Energy Act 2011 enacted, introducing a carbon price, emissions cap, and related measures.	
2012–2014	Carbon tax introduced (2012) under Gillard and repealed (2014) under Abbott.	
2015	Australia signs and ratifies the Paris Agreement; submits first Nationally Determined Contribution (NDC).	
2016	Safeguard Mechanism and other industrial emissions policies introduced under Turnbull.	
2021	Australia updates its NDC to include net zero emissions by 2050 and 26-28% emissions reductions by 2030.	
2022 (Sept)	Climate Change Act 2022 passed: 43% emissions reduction by 2030; net zero emissions by 2050; Climate Change Authority to recommend future targets.	
2022–2023	Albanese government submits revised NDC (43% by 2030) and reforms Safeguard Mechanism.	
2025 (Sep)	Australia sets a new 2035 emissions reduction target of 62-70% below 2005 levels to meet Paris Agreement obligations.	
2025 (Nov)	National Party formally abandons its support for net zero by 2050.	
2025 (Nov)	Liberal Party formally abandons net zero by 2050 commitment, proposing an "energy affordability" approach.	
2025 (Dec)	Reports warn approving new coal mine expansions would breach state climate targets (NSW).	
2025 (Dec)	Queensland government repeals renewable energy targets (70% by 2032, 80% by 2035) and plans coal plant operations until 2049.	

=== Solutions ===
There are a number of ways to achieve the goals outlined above. This includes implementing clean, renewable solutions and decentralizing energy systems. Existing technologies are available to use energy effectively and ecologically, including the use of solar, wind, and other renewable technologies, which have experienced double digit market growth globally in the last decade.

A large section of the scientific community believe that one of the real solutions to avoiding dangerous climate change lies in renewable energy and energy efficiency that can start protecting the climate today. Technically accessible renewable energy sources such as wind, wave, and solar, are capable of providing six times more energy than the world currently consumes. As coal is one of the highest emitters of greenhouse gases, closing coal power stations is one of the most powerful tools for carbon emission reduction.

The city of Melbourne is working with the wider Australian government to make Melbourne carbon neutral by the year 2050. The name of the plan is Melbourne Together for 1.5°C. The plan includes ways for Melbourne to reduce the impact of waste, and models for how to reduce transport and building emissions to zero. This is a continuation off of a plan created in 2003 to have Melbourne carbon neutral by 2020, but this did not succeed.

=== Federal Government action ===
==== Howard government ====
The Howard government was resistant to taking action to prevent global warming that would harm Australia's economy, a policy continued from the prior Keating government. In 1996 in the lead up to the Kyoto treaty this slow going attitude caused conflict with the US and EU who at that time were proposing legally binding emissions targets as part of Kyoto. Australia was unwilling to accept stricter timeframes and emissions reductions targets, such as the 20% cut (from 1990 to 2005) proposed by smaller pacific island states, because of its carbon-intensive economy. Increasingly, in the lead up to the Kyoto conference, the Howard government became internationally isolated on its climate change policy. With Australia's opposition to binding targets "figur[ing] prominently in the prime minister's [recent] discussions in Washington and London" as highlighted in a Cabinet memo. In 1997 the Cabinet agreed to establish a climate change taskforce to strengthen its Kyoto bargaining position. In 1998 the Australian Government, under Prime Minister John Howard, established the Australian Greenhouse Office, which was then the world's first government agency dedicated to cutting greenhouse gas emissions, And, also in 1998, Australia signed but did not ratify the Kyoto protocols.

The Australian Greenhouse Office put forward proposals for emissions reductions in 2000 (rejected in cabinet), 2003 (vetoed by Howard) and 2006 which was accepted by Howard and became the basis for his pre election emissions trading scheme proposal.

Rudd government

In 2007, after the first Rudd government was sworn in, the new Department of Climate Change was established under the Prime Minister and Cabinet portfolio and entrusted with coordinating and leading climate policy. The Kyoto protocol was ratified nine days after. The 2009 budget committed the government to a 25% reduction by 2020 on 2000 levels if "the world agrees to an ambitious global deal to stabilise levels of CO_{2} equivalent at 450 parts per million or lower by mid-century".

On 1 December 2009, Malcolm Turnbull the then opposition leader was unseated by Tony Abbot, voiding a speculated deal on an emissions trading scheme between the opposition and the government. This happened a day before the second rejection of the Carbon Pollution Reduction Scheme bill by the Senate on 2 December 2009. On 2 February 2010, the Emissions Trading Scheme legislation was introduced for the third time, it was voted down again and the Liberal party unveiled its own climate mitigation legislation, the Direct Action Plan.

On 27 April 2010, the Prime Minister Kevin Rudd announced that the Government has decided to delay the implementation of the Carbon Pollution Reduction Scheme (CPRS) until the end of the first commitment period of the Kyoto Protocol (ending in 2012). The government cited the lack of bipartisan support for the CPRS and the withdrawal of support by the Greens, and slow international progress on climate action after the Copenhagen Summit, as the reasons for the decision. The delay of the implementation of the CPRS was strongly criticised by the Federal Opposition under Abbott and by community and grassroots action groups such as GetUp.

Gillard (and second Rudd) government

To reduce Australia's carbon emissions, the government of Julia Gillard introduced a carbon tax on 1 July 2012, which required large businesses, defined as those emitting over 25,000 tons of carbon dioxide equivalent annually, to purchase emissions permits. The Carbon Tax reduced Australia's carbon dioxide emissions, with coal generation down 11% since 2008–09.

Abbot government

The subsequent Australian Government, elected in 2013 under then Prime Minister Tony Abbott was criticised for being "in complete denial about climate change". Abbott became known for his anti-climate change positions as was evident in a number of policies adopted by his administration. In a global warming meeting held in the United Kingdom, he reportedly said that proponents of climate change are alarmists, underscoring a need for "evidence-based" policymaking. The Abbott government repealed the carbon tax on 17 July 2014 in a heavily criticised move. The renewable energy target (RET), launched in 2001, was also modified.

Turnbull government

However, under the government of Malcolm Turnbull, Australia attended the 2015 United Nations Climate Change Conference and adopted the Paris Agreement, which includes a review of emission reduction targets every 5 years from 2020.

Australia's Clean Energy Target (CET) came under threat in October 2017 from former Prime Minister Tony Abbott. This could lead to the Australian Labor Party withdrawing support from the Turnbull government's new energy policy.

Climate policy continues to be controversial. Following the repeal of the carbon price in the last parliament, the Emissions Reduction Fund (ERF) is now Australia's main mechanism to reduce greenhouse gas emissions. However, two-thirds of the ERF's allocated $2.5 billion funding has now been spent. The ERF, and other policies, will need further funding to achieve our climate targets.

Morrison government

Under the Morrison government, Australia experienced some criticism as it plans to use a carbon accounting loophole from the expiring Kyoto Protocol agreement to fulfill its (already modest) Paris commitments. According to Climate Analytics, Australia pledged in Paris to cut its emissions between 26% and 28% below 2005 levels by 2030 but it is currently on track for a 7% cut.

The Coalition government repeatedly claimed in 2019 that it turned around Australia's greenhouse gas emissions that it inherited from the Labor government. Scott Morrison, Angus Taylor and other senior Coalition figures repeated this claim. The Coalition actually inherited a strong position from the Labor government which had enacted the carbon tax.

There are suggestions that disinformation is spread about the cause of Australia bushfires.

On 1 November 2019, Scott Morrison outlined in a speech of mining delegates at the Queensland Resources Council that he planned to legislate to outlaw climate boycotts.

=== State government actions ===
Per person emissions vary considerably by state.

==== Victoria ====
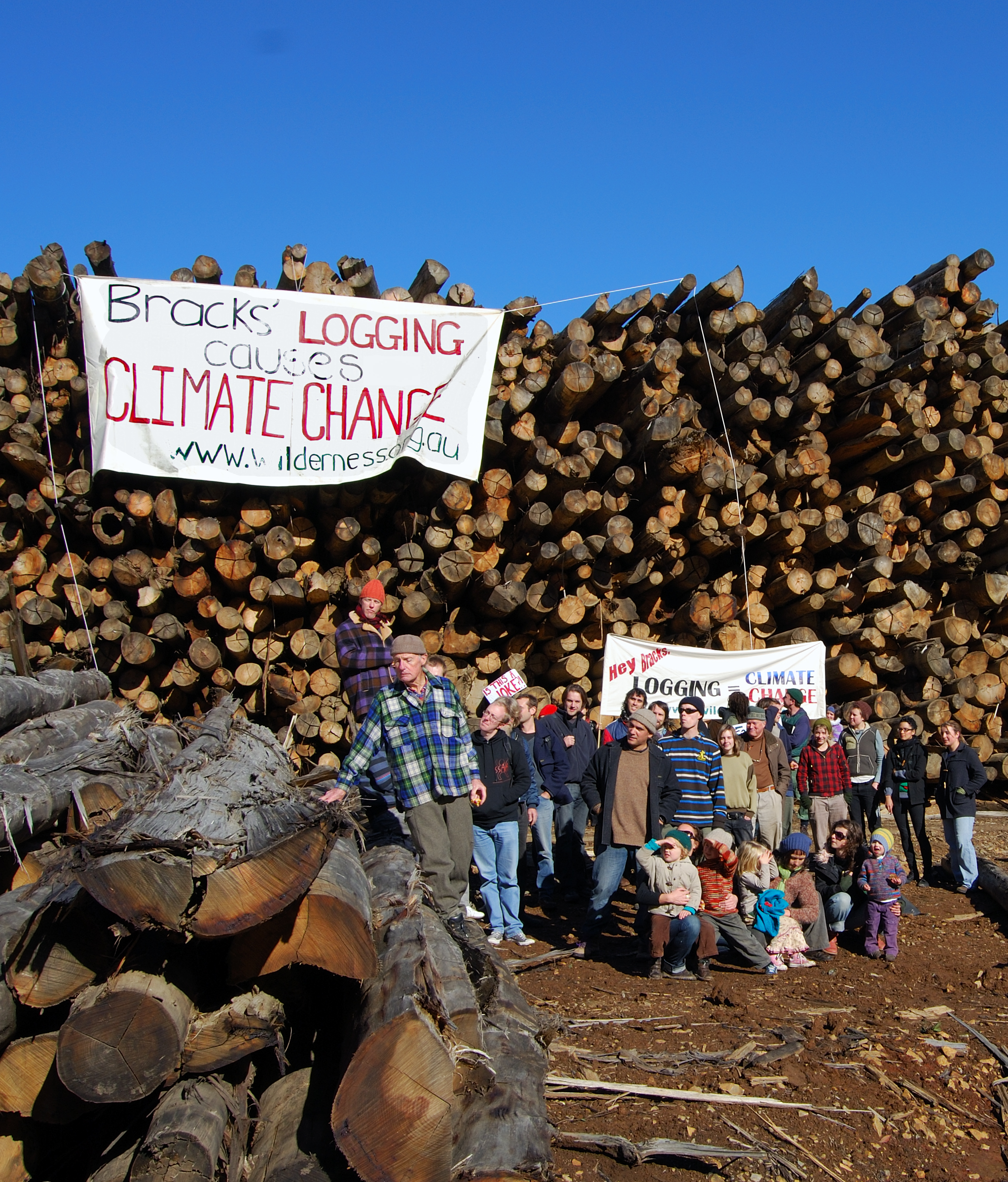
A protest on World Environment Day in Victoria

The state of Victoria, in particular, has been proactive in pursuing reductions in GHG through a range of initiatives. In 1989 it produced the first state climate change strategy, "The Greenhouse Challenge". Other states have also taken a more proactive stance than the federal government. One such initiative undertaken by the Victorian Government is the 2002 Greenhouse Challenge for Energy Policy package, which aims to reduce Victorian emissions through a mandated renewable energy target. Initially, it aimed to have a 10 per cent share of Victoria's energy consumption being produced by renewable technologies by 2010, with 1000 MW of wind power under construction by 2006. The government legislated to ensure that by 2016 electricity retailers in Victoria purchase 10 per cent of their energy from renewables. This was ultimately overtaken by the national Renewable Energy Target (RET). By providing a market incentive for the development of renewables, the government helps foster the development of the renewable energy sector. A Green Paper and White Paper on Climate Change was produced in 2010, including funding for a number of programs. A Climate Change Act was passed including targets for 50% reduction in emissions. A recent review of this Act has recommended further changes.

The supreme court of Australia stopped a logging project in Victoria because it will be particularly destructive after the bushfires. The premier of Victoria Daniel Andrews announced that by 2030 logging in the state will be banned.

==== South Australia ====
Former Premier Mike Rann (2002–2011) was Australia's first Climate Change Minister and passed legislation committing South Australia to renewable energy and emissions reduction targets. Announced in March 2006, this was the first legislation passed anywhere in Australia committed to cutting emissions. By the end of 2011, 26% of South Australia's electricity generation derived from wind power, edging out coal-fired power for the first time. Although only 7.2% of Australia's population live in South Australia, in 2011, it had 54% of Australia's installed wind capacity. Following the introduction of solar feed-in tariff legislation South Australia also had the highest per-capita take-up of household rooftop photo-voltaic installations in Australia. In an educative program, the Rann government invested in installing rooftop solar arrays on the major public buildings including the Parliament, Museum, Adelaide Airport, Adelaide Showgrounds pavilion and public schools. About 31% of South Australia's total power is derived from renewables. In the five years to the end of 2011, South Australia experienced a 15% drop in emissions, despite strong employment and economic growth during this period.

In 2010, the Solar Art Prize was created by Pip Fletcher, and has run annually since, inviting artists from South Australia to reflect subjects of climate change and environmentalism in their work. Some winning artists receive renewable energy service prizes which can be redeemed as solar panels, solar hot water or battery storage systems.

== See also ==
- Climate change in Australia
- Coal mining in Australia
- Environmental issues in Australia
- Impact of the COVID-19 pandemic on the environment
- Plug-in electric vehicles in Australia
