= Solar art prize =

Australian art award

The Solar art prize is an annual art exhibition hosted by the Royal Society of the Arts, South Australia. The prize was established by Pip Fletcher in 2010, and has consistently invited artists to respond to the subject of climate change. The event's recurring theme is "Caring for Our Planet". Artists are invited to submit new works for consideration, and various prizes are offered. Prizes include cash and sponsor offerings, including tens of thousands of dollars in credits to be redeemed on solar power system services and installations, which include solar panels, hot water systems and batteries.

In 2014, 51 artists submitted 66 different works.

The prize endeavors to "maintain Global Warming and its ramifications in the public eye when some are tempted to be fatalistic and give up trying to do anything" and "gives the artists the chance to win solar vouchers for themselves or their friends in South Australia, thereby lowering their carbon footprint and at the same time saving them money."

Past overall winners of the prize are listed on the event's Facebook page.

Year	Overall winner	Artwork	Medium
2016	Babs Sinclair	Channel Country	Painting
2015	Daniel Hurditch	Earth Patterns	Painting
2014	Frey Micklethwait	Homin-ID	Unpublished book
2013	Peter Noble	Dangerzone	Painting
2012	Uta Mooney	On the edge	Painting
2011	Hans Koppan	Salisbury Wetlands	Painting
2010	Jack Briner	Just a drop in the ocean	Painting
2019	David Braun	Rocky Top, Mount Lofty	Pen drawing
2020	Terry MacDermot	The Deep Shadow of Ocean Drillin	
2021	Elizabeth Doidge	Man Leaving the Land and Windmill	Acrylic triptych
2022	Mirjana Dobson	A Whiter Shade	porcelain/slip/lustre
2023	Wendy Jennings (joint winner)	They will just disappear	
2023	Paul Whitehead (joint winner)	Healing (Galahs at Mt Chambers Gorge)	Photograph
2024	Terry McDermot	Terra Mater	

	People's Choice Award	
Year	Winner	Artwork
2024	David Braun	The regrowth begins
