= Carbon capture and storage in Australia =

As in many developed countries, the number of patents in Australia covering CCS technologies surged in the late 2000s, but declined in the 2010s.

Carbon capture and storage (CCS) is a technology that can capture carbon dioxide CO_{2} emissions produced from fossil fuels in electricity, industrial processes which prevents CO_{2} from entering the atmosphere. Carbon capture and storage is also used to sequester CO_{2} filtered out of natural gas from certain natural gas fields. While typically the CO_{2} has no value after being stored, Enhanced Oil Recovery uses CO_{2} to increase yield from declining oil fields.

There are no currently-operating large-scale CCS projects in Australia, although the Gorgon gas project will qualify when it is fully operational. Despite multiple CCS demonstration projects at Australian coal-fired power stations, none of Australia's coal plants are currently capturing CO_{2} or have a time frame for doing so. Australian Treasury modelling finds that CCS is not expected to be commercially viable until the 2030s. The Intergovernmental Panel on Climate Change (IPCC) estimates that the economic potential of CCS could be between 10% and 55% of the total carbon mitigation effort until 2100.

In the 2017 budget, the Turnbull government announced the cessation of the Low Emissions Technology Demonstration Fund in the 2017 financial year and the cessation of business case funding for the Carbon Capture and Storage Flagships program in financial year 2019. This is on top of the 2015 budget, where the Abbott government cut $460m from CCS research projects leaving $191.7m to continue existing projects for the next seven years. The program had already been cut by the previous Labor government and much of the funding remained unallocated.

== Challenges ==
1. Cost of CCS will make coal-fired electricity more expensive than wind power
2. Potential leakage from underground or undersea reservoirs
3. Scarcity of potential sites and capacity compared to volumes of greenhouse gas needed to be sequestered on an ongoing basis
4. CCS currently requires up to 30% more coal than conventional plants to cover the energy needs of CCS (although R&D is rapidly improving efficiencies), and that extra coal must first be mined (which has environmental effects) and transported to the plant (which takes energy)
5. Infrastructure required would take years to build
6. emissions of acid rain-causing gases like nitrogen oxides and sulfur oxides of a plant that captures CO_{2} will be up to 40 percent greater than the total cradle-to-grave emissions of a modern plant that doesn't capture its CO_{2} because of the extra coal burnt

=== Transport of CO_{2} ===
In Australia, the major emissions sites are in the Latrobe and Hunter valleys. The Latrobe Valley has considerable potential storage within a few hundred kilometres in Bass Strait which the CarbonNet Project was investigating (see below). There are no particularly promising large storage prospects near the Hunter Valley. Geologically prospective areas include the North West Shelf (see the Gorgon gas project below) and Bass Strait. Australia has very extensive basins with deep saline formations, both onshore and particularly offshore, in which large quantities of carbon dioxide can dissolve. In such formations Australia has a potential carbon dioxide storage resource equivalent to many hundreds of years of emissions at the current rate. Work is now underway to fully assess storage potential.

== Government involvement ==
In November 2008, the Australian Commonwealth Government passed the Offshore Petroleum Amendment (Greenhouse Gas Storage) Act 2008, which provides a regulatory framework for carbon dioxide storage in federal offshore waters.

The Victorian Greenhouse Gas Geological Sequestration Act 2008 (No. 61 of 2008) received Royal Assent on 5 November 2008. It provides a dedicated legal framework enabling the onshore injection and permanent storage of greenhouse gas substances. The state government has also developed a regulatory framework for offshore storage sites (i.e. those sites falling within the 3 nautical mile extent of state jurisdiction; the Offshore Petroleum and Greenhouse Gas Storage Act 2010.

Both Australia's state and federal governments have been major contributors to CCS research and development. Federal government CCS initiatives include the CO2CRC (founded 2003), the Low Emission Technology Demonstration Fund (2004–2017), funding for the Asia-Pacific Partnership on Clean Development and Climate (2006–2011, renewables, CCS and other), National Low Emissions Coal Initiative (founded 2008), Global CCS Institute (founded 2009), Carbon Capture and Storage Flagships (2009–2019), the Carbon Capture and Storage Research Development and Demonstration Fund (2015–2016) and the National CO_{2} Infrastructure Plan operated by Geoscience Australia (2012–2016).

Federal funding commitments to these initiatives total $3.5–3.6 billion, of which $1.3–$1.6 billion has been committed or is expected to be committed.

In February 2017, Prime Minister Malcolm Turnbull said:

We've invested $590 million since 2009 in clean coal technology research and demonstration and yet we do not have one modern high-efficiency low-emissions coal-fired power station, let alone one with carbon capture and storage.

In April 2018, a parliamentary inquiry heard from energy researchers that carbon capture and storage requires a price on carbon to be viable.

== Commercial projects in operation ==
There are no large-scale commercial CCS projects within Australia. The Global CCS Institute defines "large-scale" as 400,000 tonnes of CO_{2} per annum, or 800,000 tonnes per annum for a coal plant. It previously used a one million tonnes per annum threshold.

Demonstration and proposed projects and projects under construction are listed below with brief descriptions.

== Demonstration projects ==
=== CO2CRC Otway Project ===
The CO2CRC Otway Project in Western Victoria is a demonstration project which has injected and stored over 65,000 tonnes of carbon dioxide in a depleted natural gas reservoir 2 km below the Earth's surface. The project was first proposed to the Board of the then Australian Petroleum Cooperative Research Centre (APCRC) in March 1998. There has been no sign of leakage according to a comprehensive monitoring and verification program. A mixture of Carbon dioxide and methane gas is extracted from a well in the Bathurst field, then compressed and transported via dedicated pipeline to the Naylor field two kilometres away. The gases are then injected into the depleted gas reservoir through a dedicated injection well. A nearby well (previously used to produce natural gas) is used to monitor the injected carbon dioxide. A second stage of the project, involving evaluation of carbon dioxide storage in deep saline formations, has been highly successful and provided data on estimating CO_{2} storage capacity using an innovative single well test. The project is Australia's first demonstration of geosequestration and one of the world's largest geosequestration research projects. This area has active exploration for geothermal and petroleum resources and has been supported by geotechnical work completed by the public sector and the private sector.

=== Post combustion capture projects in the Latrobe Valley ===
The Latrobe Valley Post Combustion Capture Project was a joint collaboration between Loy Yang Power, International Power Hazelwood, government and researchers from CSIRO's Energy Transformed Flagship and CO2CRC (including Monash and Melbourne Universities), involving research at both Loy Yang and Hazelwood power stations. The 10.5-metre-high pilot plant at Loy Yang was designed to capture up to 1,000 tonnes of CO_{2} per annum from the power station's exhaust-gas flues. Future trials were expected to involve the use of a range of different CO_{2}-capture liquids. On 9 July 2008, CSIRO Energy Technology Chief Dr David Brockway announced that carbon dioxide (CO_{2}) had been captured from power station flue gases in a post-combustion-capture (PCC) pilot plant at Loy Yang Power Station in Victoria's Latrobe Valley. The purpose of the pilot plant is to conduct research, not to capture all the emissions from the power station.

Further government projects in this area led to many geo-technical studies that review gas and liquid migration, trapping and leakage. While the Gippsland area has been described as a basin margin, this is somewhat vague. The area defines a major fold belt onshore and offshore. The key risk to injection of CO_{2} in the area is the ability to keep gas in the ground. Multiple regional and local studies over the area have been completed by government and private companies.

In 2016, the PICA Post-Combustion Project was announced. This is a joint collaboration between CSIRO, IHI Corporation (Japanese technology provider) and AGL. It will use a pilot plant to test CO_{2}-capture liquids over a two-year period.

=== The CO2CRC/HRL Mulgrave Capture Project ===
CO2CRC commissioned three carbon dioxide capture research rigs at HRL's gasifier research facility at Mulgrave in Melbourne, Victoria. The CO2CRC rigs captured carbon dioxide from syngas, the product of the brown coal gasifier, using solvent, membrane and adsorbent technologies. The capture technologies are equally applicable to syngas from brown and black coal, gas or biomass fuels. During the project, researchers evaluated each technology for efficiency and cost-effectiveness. Advanced gasifier technologies are highly suitable for carbon dioxide capture for CCS as they produce a concentrated stream of carbon dioxide.

=== Liquid Fuel Carrier Research and Development Project ===
The CO_{2} to liquid fuel project proposes a game changing technology for conversion of solar energy to liquid fuels. Both solar heat and solar PV electricity will be used to drive a solid oxide electrolyser device for a production of hydrogen and syngas which then can be converted onsite into transportable liquid fuels enabling large-scale energy export and storage.

== Proposed projects ==
=== Gorgon gas field, Barrow Island ===
This project led by Chevron will be designed to capture 3.5 Mt of carbon dioxide per annum from Greater Gorgon gas fields and store it in the Dupuy formation beneath the Barrow Island. The project will be the largest carbon dioxide sequestration operation in the world. Chevron is liable for leaks and other damage during the project's lifetime and for 15 years afterwards, but in 2009 the state and federal governments agreed to indemnify Chevron against liability for the project after that time, with the Commonwealth in 2015 confirming it would adopt 80% of the liability and WA the remaining 20%.

When construction on the project began in 2009, it was expected to be completed by 2014 - including carbon capture and storage. The project ultimately started extracting gas in February 2017 but carbon capture and storage was delayed multiple times. A delay until March 2019 resulted in a further five million tonnes of CO_{2} to be released, because:

A Chevron report to the State Government released yesterday said start-up checks this year found leaking valves, valves that could corrode and excess water in the pipeline from the LNG plant to the injection wells that could cause the pipeline to corrode.

In May 2018, the WA Environmental Protection Authority announced an investigation into whether Gorgon could meet its storage commitments given the delays. In March 2019, Chevron announced that carbon capture and storage was delayed by another nine months, which would result in the release of a further 7.9 to 11.1 million tonnes of CO_{2}.

WWF claims that the Gorgon geosequestration project is potentially unsafe as the area has over 700 wells drilled in the area, 50 of which reach the area proposed for geosequestration of CO_{2}. Fault lines compound the problems. Barrow Island is also an A class nature reserve of global importance.

=== Hydrogen Energy Supply Chain project ===
In April 2018, the federal and Victorian governments announced a brown coal-to-hydrogen project that would operate out of AGL Energy's Loy Yang A power station. Construction is expected to begin in 2019, and hydrogen production by 2020 or 2021.

The pilot program will not include carbon capture and storage, but it is expected if the project is expanded, with proponent Kawasaki Heavy Industries says that coal-to-hydrogen technology is not commercial without it.

=== The CarbonNet Project ===
CarbonNet was established by the Victorian Government in 2009 to investigate the potential for establishing a world class, large-scale, multi-user carbon capture and storage network in Victoria. In 2012 the Australian Government selected CarbonNet as one of only two CCS flagship projects under its Clean Energy Initiative and, with the State of Victoria, awarded the project a further $100 million in joint funding to undertake feasibility. The Global CCS Institute provided $2.3 million in support.

In 2016 it was reported that "When Australia repealed the carbon price the project did not advance", but as of January 2018 the project was conducting a 17-day seismic survey of former oil wells in the Gippsland Basin.

== Completed projects ==
=== Callide Oxyfuel Project, Queensland ===
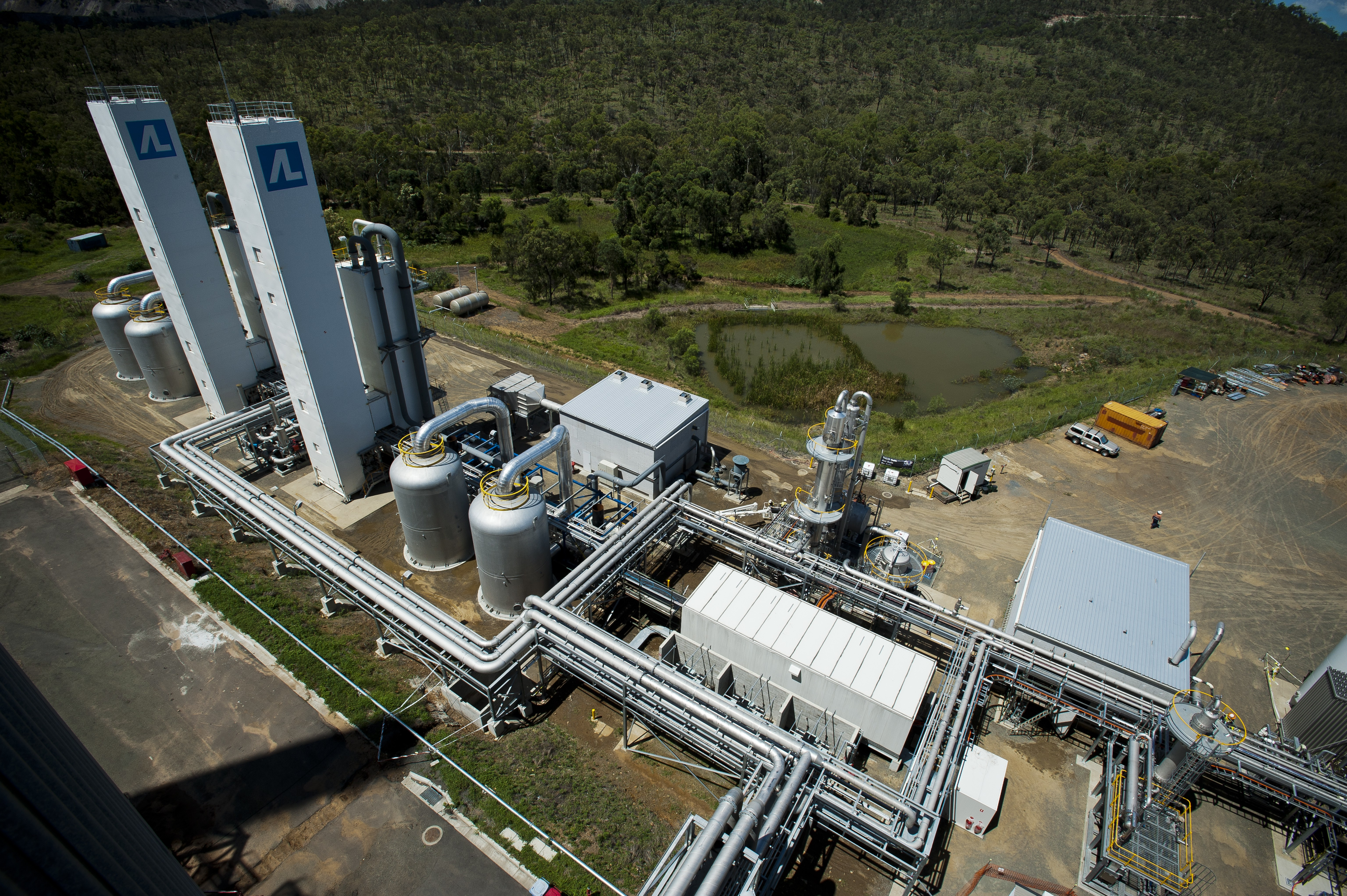
Overview of the Callide Oxyfuel Project

The Callide Oxyfuel Project was the largest oxyfuel demonstration in the world when it completed its demonstration phase in March 2015. It demonstrated carbon capture using oxyfuel combustion, but did not attempt carbon storage. Oxyfuel technology enables coal to burn efficiently in oxygen (rather than air as in a conventional power station), reducing emissions and producing carbon dioxide in a more concentrated form, allowing it to be stored and extracted.

The Oxyfuel boiler operated for two years and nine months, beyond the project's expected duration, and achieved a capture of 75 tonnes of CO_{2} per day (27,300 tonnes per annum). The project team assessed eight potential carbon storage sites but these were unsuitable because of location, availability and geological profile.

By capturing the CO_{2} produced from the combustion of the feed coal, which would otherwise be released to the atmosphere, the project demonstrated that using carbon capture technology, deep cuts could be made to power station emissions to help slow the process of climate change whilst maintaining the use of fossil fuels as major energy sources.

The project was a joint venture partnership comprising CS Energy, ACA Low Emissions Technologies (ACALET) (now called COAL21), Glencore, Schlumberger Carbon Services, and Japanese participants J-Power, Mitsui & Co., Ltd and IHI Corporation. The project was awarded $63 million from the Commonwealth Government under the Low Emissions Technology Demonstration Fund and received additional financial support from ACALET and the Japanese and Queensland governments, and technical support from JCOAL. Total investment in the project, covering capital works and operations and maintenance was $250 million. It was a project for the Asia-Pacific Partnership on Clean Development and Climate.

The Callide Oxyfuel Project demonstrated the production of electricity from coal with almost no power station emissions to the atmosphere by capturing a major portion of the flue gas CO_{2} as liquefied gas, and other waste gases such as oxides of nitrogen (NOx), oxides of sulphur (SOx), and heavy metals in condensate form. The project involved the following key technologies and activities:

1. oxyfuel combustion of coal to achieve a 60 percent to 70 percent reduction in the actual volume of flue gas and a proportionate increase in the CO_{2} concentration, from around 20% to around 80%. For a new build power station, it is believed that his value would be further increased to around 95%.
2. cryogenic separation and recovery of industrial grade CO_{2} from the power station flue gas stream, which could either be partially utilised in industry or potentially in enhanced oil recovery (EOR), which assists in maximising oil production from an oil well.
3. assessment of CO_{2} storage capacity in Queensland, and injection testing of Callide Oxyfuel CO_{2}.

The project demonstrated more than 10,000 hours of oxy-combustion and more than 5,000 hours of carbon capture.

The Callide Oxyfuel Project demonstrated that new technology could be applied to an old power station to produce cleaner electricity. Built in the 1960s, the Callide A Power Station near Biloela in Central Queensland was chosen as the project’s demonstration site. Retrofitting the Callide A Power Station with oxyfuel technology represented a low-risk and cost- and time-effective way to demonstrate clean coal technology on an industrial scale, and represented a new stage in the station’s history.

In 2017, Martin Moore, chief executive officer of project proponent CS Energy said of the Callide project:

We proved that technologically it’s possible to retrofit [CCS] to existing coal-fired plants, but commercially, the numbers don’t stack up … It’s unlikely there will be [a commercial operation for CCS in Australia], I think that technology may well be bypassed … simply because of the economics. … If you could decarbonise coal by capturing and sequestering the emissions, then you’d have clean coal. It sounds easy if you say it fast enough, but it’s not that simple.

=== International Power Carbon Capture Plant, Victoria (Hazelwood 2030) ===
A post-combustion capture plant operated at the International Power GDF Suez Hazelwood Power Station.

When announced in 2007, the project was originally planned as a retro-fit of one of Hazelwood's eight generating units, which would have reduced its emissions intensity by 20% (500,000 tonnes per annum). It was offered a $50 million federal government grant from the Low Emissions Technology Development Fund and a $30 million Victorian government grant from the Energy Technology Innovation Strategy.

A pilot program with a more modest capture objective was completed. The solvent capture plant cost $10 million (including grants from state and federal governments) and began operation in 2009, capturing and chemically sequestered CO_{2} at a nominal rate of 10,000 tonnes per annum.

Hazelwood Power Station closed in March 2017.

== Delayed projects ==
=== Monash coal-to-liquids ===
On 2 December 2008 Shell and Anglo American announced that this possible brown coal project in the Latrobe Valley will not proceed at present. They have described it as a "long term" opportunity.

The planned project was planned to have some CCS, storing the gas captured in depleted off-shore oil fields in the Gippsland Basin in east Bass Strait.

== Cancelled projects ==
=== BP Kwinana (WA) coal to gas plant ===
A proposed $2 billion "hydrogen energy" coal-to-gas plant will not proceed because the geological formations off Perth, which were intended to sequester the CO_{2}, contain gas "chimneys" that "mean it is next to impossible to establish a seal in the strata that could contain the CO_{2}".

=== Zerogen power station ===
The Zerogen powerstation project near Stanwell power station in Queensland is proposed to be a 100 MW "Integrated Gasification Combined Cycle" power station with CCS. In late 2010, the Government of Queensland announced it would not fund the Zerogen project because it was not economically viable and that it would be sold off.

=== Fairview project ===
The Fairview Project, near Roma in South West Queensland, was intended to capture 1/3 of the CO_{2} emissions from a 100 MW coal seam methane gas-fired power station. In 2006 it was selected to receive federal government funding, but as of September 2017 it does not appear on the Global CCS Institute's list of projects.

== See also ==
- Coal mining in Australia
- Emissions trading
- Mandatory renewable energy targets
- Mitigation of global warming in Australia
- Renewable energy commercialization in Australia
