= Climate change in Queensland =

Climate change in Queensland affects various environments and industries, including agriculture.

== Greenhouse gas emissions ==
Queensland's emissions decreased from 191.94 million tonnes in 2005 to 124.1million tonnes in 2022 representing a reduction of 35.3% over this time period.

== Impacts of climate change ==
=== Flooding ===
Large areas across north Queensland experienced significant flooding in 2025.

=== Tourism ===
Of all the states of Australia, Queensland has the highest proportion of tourism assets which are at risk due to climate.

== Response ==
=== Policies ===
The Queensland government approved new projects for gas exploration. The Queensland government blocked the public release of a report, which recommended that gas wells in floodplains in the western Queensland channel country should be excluded and that unconventional petroleum should be designated as an unacceptable use in the area.

=== Legislation ===
==== Clean Economy Jobs Act 2024 ====
Electricity Infrastructure Investment Act 2020

Parliament of Queensland
- Long title: An Act to provide for the reduction of greenhouse gas emissions in Queensland by stating emissions reduction targets and for related purposes
- Citation: 2024, No. 16
- Assented to: 2024-04-26

Legislative history
- Bill title: Clean Economy Jobs Bill 2024

Keywords
- emissions targets
- Status: In force

The Act requires Queensland to cut emissions by 30% on 2005 levels by 2030, 75% by 2035 and reach net zero emissions by 2050. The Act also entrenches public ownership of energy assets.

The bill had been supported by the Liberal National Party opposition. There had been speculation that the LNP would not support the bill, and they had wanted to consider modelling on the impacts of the policy before they made their final decision.

== See also ==
- Climate change in Australia
