= Climate change in the Northern Territory =

Climate change in the Northern Territory affects various environments and industries, including agriculture.

== Greenhouse gas emissions ==
The state's emissions amounted to 11.21 million tonnes in 2005 compared to 16.73 million tonnes in 2022.

The Northern Territory had the highest emissions per capita out of Australia's 6 states and 2 self-governing territories.

== Impacts of climate change ==
In 2023, "more than 100,000 hectares" burned in the MacDonnell Ranges area.

== Response ==
=== Policies ===
In 2024, a leaked consultation paper revealed plans to give the Chief Minister the ability to exempt major projects from Northern Territory regulatory policies, including both renewables projects and gas projects. In 2024, the Northern Territory government approved a project which could potentially increase the territory's emissions by 150% by 2050.

The Northern Territory's home and business solar battery had an increase in uptake after the allocation was increased from $5,000 to $12,000, which had been implemented to increase usage of renewables. The Northern Territory government approved a 12,000-hectare solar farm project.

== See also ==
- Climate change in Australia
