= Climate change in South Australia =

Climate change in South Australia affects various environments and industries, including agriculture.

== Greenhouse gas emissions ==
The state's emissions amounted to 76.23 million tonnes in 2005 compared to 82.64 million tonnes in 2022.

== Impacts of climate change ==
=== Forest fires ===
Soaring temperatures led to catastrophic forest fires during the 2019–20 bushfire season.

== Response ==
=== Policies ===
South Australia's deployment of renewables during 2011 and 2020 is considered "significant". South Australia's tree-planting laws are considered to be the weakest in Australia. The Whyalla were put into administration and it is planned that the South Australian government will fund its conversion to renewable energy.

=== Legislation ===
Climate Change and Greenhouse Emissions Reduction Act 2007

Parliament of South Australia
- Long title: An Act to provide for measures to address climate change with a view to assisting to achieve a sustainable future for the State; to set targets to achieve a reduction in greenhouse gas emissions within the State; to promote the use of renewable sources of energy; to promote business and community understanding about issues surrounding climate change; to facilitate the early development of policies and programs to address climate change; and for other purposes
- Citation: No 22 of 2007
- Assented to: 2007-06-28
- Commenced: 2007-07-02

Legislative history
- Bill title: Climate Change and Greenhouse Emissions Reduction Bill 2006
- Bill citation: No 83 of 2006

Keywords
- emissions targets
- Status: In force

==== Climate Change and Greenhouse Emissions Reduction Act 2007 ====
The Act was the first climate legislation in Australia. This made South Australia the first state in Australia to commit to greenhouse gas emissions cuts, one of the first commonwealth jurisdictions with climate laws and the first jurisdiction in the world with a binding 2050 target. The Act facilitates the early development of policies and programmes to support renewables and promotes the uptake of renewables by wholesale purchasers.

The Act legislates that the state has a legal obligation to ensure that emissions are reduced by 60% to an amount that is equal to or less than 40% of 1990 emissions levels.

In 2024, an amendment bill was tabled in the South Australian Parliament to further strengthen the targets - net zero emissions by 2027.

Under the legislation the government of South Australia also made a commitment to make Adelaide "the world's first carbon neutral city" by 2020.

By 2018 local generation of wind and solar electricity had reached 52% and emissions had fallen 32% compared to 2005 levels. Local generation of electricity is expected to reach 100% by 2025.

== See also ==
- Climate change in Australia
