= Dalforce =

Singapore Oversea Chinese Anti-Japanese Volunteer Army
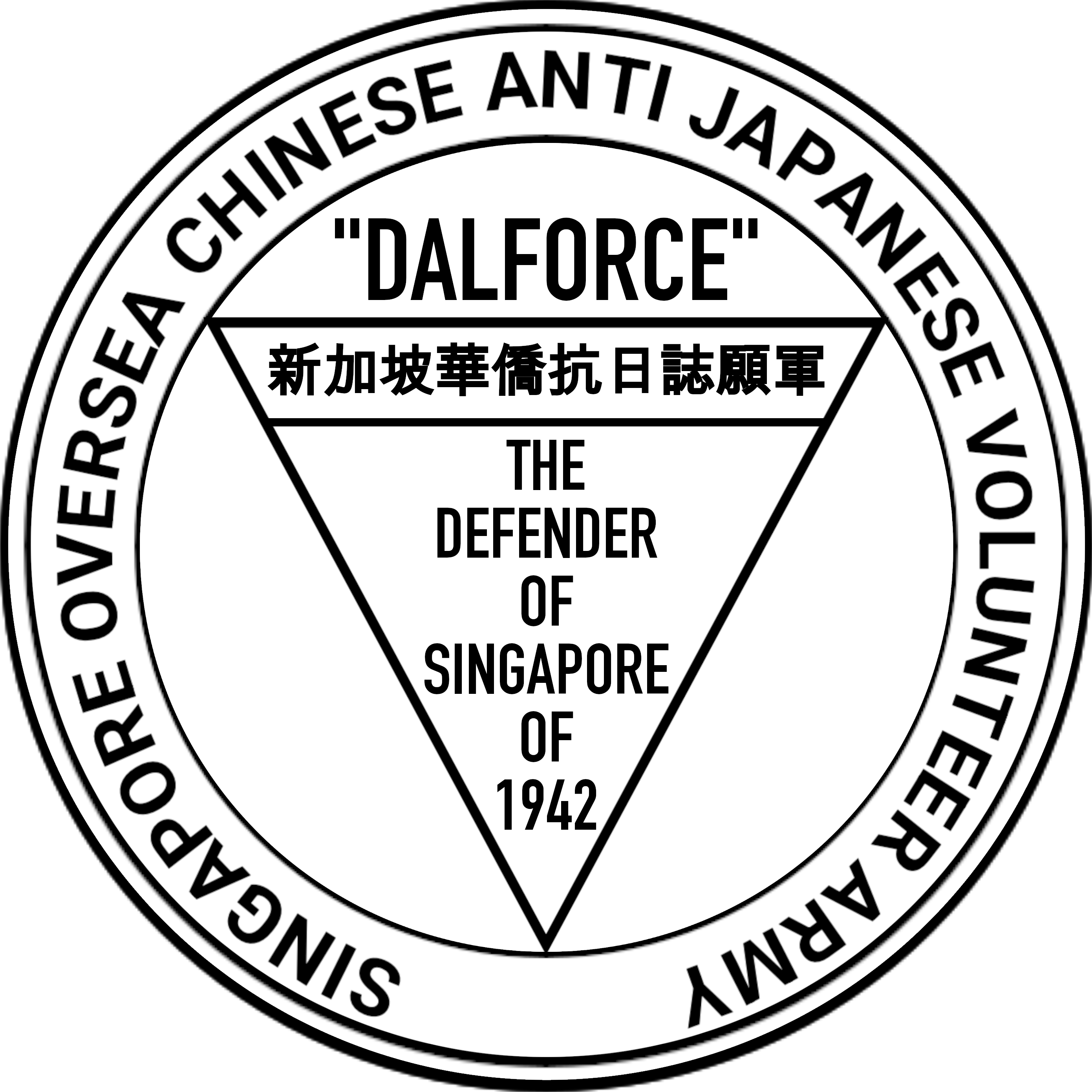
- Active: 25 December 1941 – 13 February 1942
- Allegiance: Malaya Command
- Type: Irregular military
- Role: Resistance, Guerrilla
- Size: 4,000 (1,250 armed)
- Part of: Australian 22nd Brigade; 1st Malaya Infantry Brigade
- Garrison/HQ: Kim Yam Road HQ; Ee Hoe Hean Club
- Nickname: "Dalley's Desperadoes"
- Engagements: Battle of Singapore

Commanders
- Notable commanders: Lt. Col. John Dalley

Dalforce, officially the Singapore Oversea Chinese Anti-Japanese Volunteer Army (Chinese: 星華義勇軍; pinyin: Xīnghuá yìyǒngjūn, commonly spelled as "overseas") was an irregular forces/guerrilla unit within the British Straits Settlements Volunteer Force during World War II. Its members were recruited among the ethnic Chinese people of Singapore. It was created on 25 December 1941 by Lieutenant Colonel John Dalley of the Federated Malay States Police Force. The unit was known to the British colonial administration as Dalforce, after its chief instructor and commanding officer, John Dalley, whereas the Chinese in Singapore only knew it as the Singapore Overseas Chinese Anti-Japanese Volunteer Army. This formation took part in the Battle of Singapore and some members conducted a guerrilla campaign against Japanese forces during the Japanese occupation. The British noted how ferociously the Chinese volunteers in Dalforce fought, earning them the nickname Dalley's Desperadoes.

== Origins ==
Dalley had suggested creating a guerrilla network in 1940 but it was not until about a year later, when the Japanese invasion was imminent, did it become apparent that the official recruitment of the local Chinese against the Japanese was essential. The British Government relented and on 25 December 1941, Dalforce was officially established, ignoring the fact that the existing Singapore Overseas Chinese Anti-Japanese Volunteer Army had been in existence under Chinese leadership since at least 1939. John Dalley, together with his fellow British officers, began training in Johore in mid-January 1942 with a force of 200 men. By the time the Japanese invaded, Dalforce numbered 4,000 resistance fighters.

Due to the divided leadership between the Communist Chinese and the Kuomintang, the army was divided into two sections. One is the Singapore Overseas Chinese Volunteer Army, which was mainly Communist and under direct command of Dalley, and the smaller Kuomintang Overseas Chinese Guard Force under the command of Chinese Nationalist Major Hu Tie Jun. Both sections comprised a total strength not exceeding 1,500 men, and the Overseas Chinese Guard Force was also trained by British officers. Ian Morrison, the Malayan correspondent for The Times in 1942, also noted that they were "trained, and placed in formations according to their political sympathies. There was one school where the Kuomintang adherents were trained, another where the Communists were trained".

== Development ==
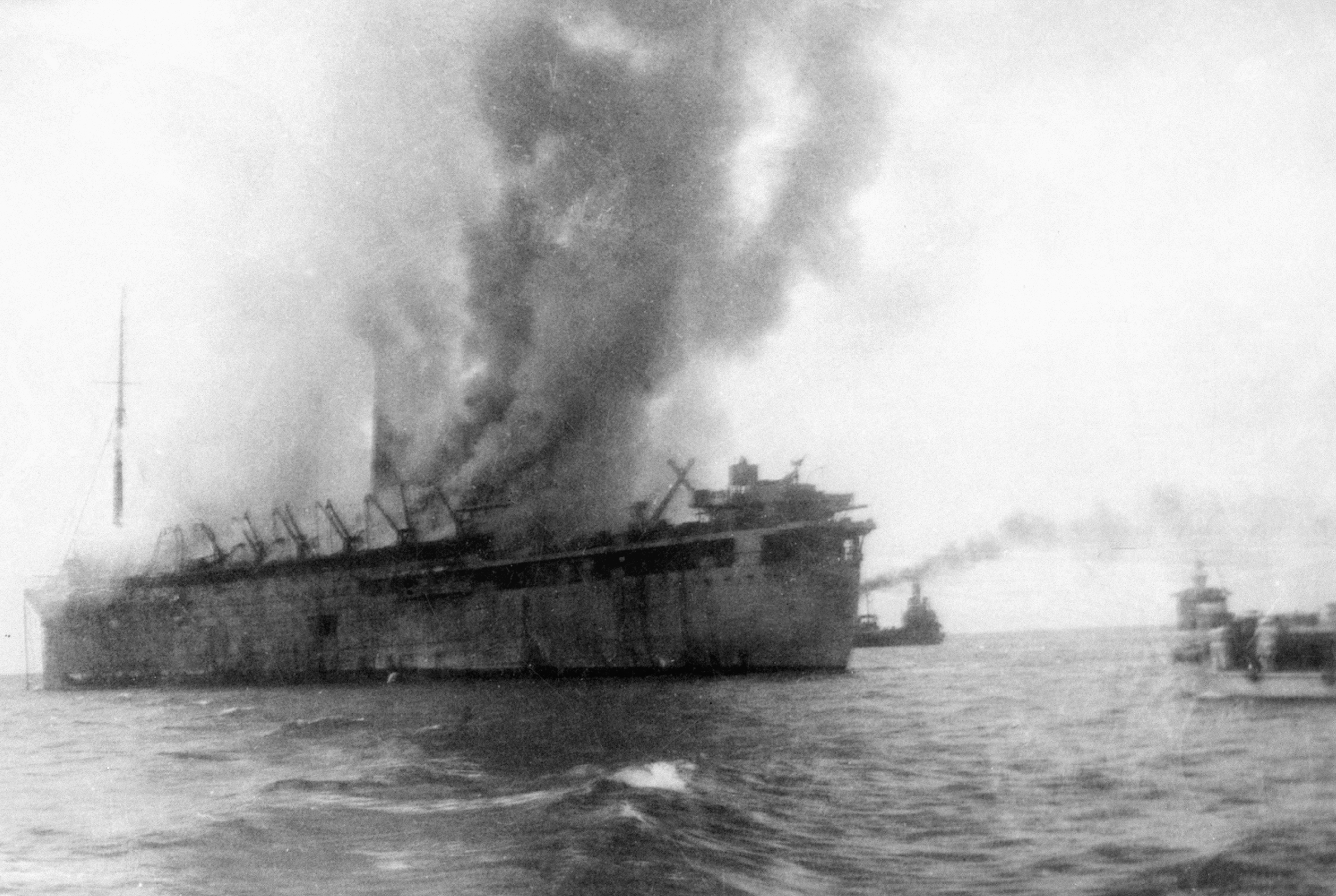
The SS Empress of Asia ablaze after being attacked by Japanese aircraft. A significant part of the military equipment and other supplies which sank with the Empress were said to have been intended for the ill-equipped Dalforce fighters.

Dalforce was not issued uniforms worn by Commonwealth troops. Instead, they had to wear tailored clothing and bandanas to prevent friendly fire. A few men tied a piece of red cloth to their right arms and a yellow one around their heads to reflect the unity of the Overseas Chinese with the Republic of China and Chinese traditions.

Most were issued Lee–Enfield No.I Mk.III rifles, bayonets and about 7–20 bullets each for those in the Communist wing and 24 bullets for those in the Chinese Nationalist wing. Only a small number wielded grenades and Bren light machine guns. Others had to carry weapons used for hunting animals, such as sporting rifles and parangs. Military training lasted until the Japanese invaded Singapore. Female members were given the responsibility of simple tasks like first aid, cooking, relaying messages and other menial tasks.

The British actually intended to fully equip the troops in preparation for the invasion. This became impossible when the liner SS Empress of Asia, which carried the supplies, was sunk by Japanese aircraft en route to Singapore from Bombay. According to officer Frank Brewer, the standard issue for each soldier would have been a combat shotgun, seven rounds of ammunition and two grenades.

There weren't enough ordinary rifles to be handed out to them. I know one company had as many as three different types of sporting guns, this made it very difficult to try and teach [the men] how these things operate in a very short time.

— Frank Brewer

Training was also conducted at the Special Operations Executive (SOE) 101 Special Training School in Singapore, to prepare another unit of local Chinese for jungle warfare in Malaya in December 1941. Because it was no longer possible to deploy them to Malaya, many were incorporated into Dalforce.

=== Disposition of companies ===
Dalforce had a total of five companies in Singapore, each containing about a hundred troops:

1. 1× Company stationed at Jurong 18th Milestone.
2. 1× Company attached to the 2/20 Battalion, Australian 22nd Brigade at Sarimbun beach.
3. 1× Company at Causeway Sector.
4. 1× Company at area between Serangoon River and Pasir Ris (Also referred to as the company at Hougang).
5. 1× Overseas Chinese Guard Platoon stationed in Kranji.

== Combat history ==
Dalforce volunteers were deployed to the frontline on 5 February. They fought at Sarimbun Beach, Bukit Timah, as well as the Woodlands and Kranji areas. They were mostly used to patrol mangrove swamps where enemy landings might be made. A Dalforce unit was also attached to the 1st Malaya Infantry Brigade which took part in the Battle of Pasir Panjang.

Company No. 1, stationed at the end of Jurong Road was involved in action even before the invasion, repulsing two waves of Japanese patrol boats. In the first incident, the patrol boats retreated after taking fire. On the next day, the night of 6 February 1942, the company exchanged fire with about thirty Japanese soldiers, but was also involved in friendly fire with the 44th Indian Brigade while both were retreating along the lower areas of the Jurong river.

Company No. 2s first military engagement also occurred on the night of 6 February 1942. The company's first and second platoons were able to repulse an approaching group of Japanese rubber boats (each carrying one soldier), sinking three out of five of the rafts. They later returned with motorised rubber rafts, but were discovered and attacked by both the Australians and Dalforce, and were forced to retreat. Over sixty men (out of about 150) from the company managed to survive the initial Japanese landings on the night of 8 February by retreating down Lim Chu Kang Road and then swimming across the tributaries of the Kranji river to make it to Choa Chu Kang Road.

Madam Cheng Seang Ho, nicknamed the legendary Passionaria of Malaya (after La Pasionaria of the Spanish Civil War), fought the Japanese at Bukit Timah together with her husband. Both were over 60 years of age when they volunteered, making their last stand at Bukit Timah heights exchanging fire with the Japanese from behind trees. Madam Cheng and her husband's heroics at Bukit Timah earned them a certificate of recognition in 1948, signed by Lieutenant-Colonel Dalley himself. Madam Cheng's husband was later captured and executed by the Kempeitai.

The unit suffered severe casualties due to lack of training, equipment and armament. The Japanese despised Dalforce bitterly, deciding to use them as an excuse for their treatment of the Chinese population, although this behaviour was instigated by the Kempeitai rather than by Lieutenant-General Tomoyuki Yamashita.

== End of Dalforce ==
On 13 February 1942, two days before the surrender of Singapore by General Arthur Percival General Officer Commanding Malaya, Dalley assembled Dalforce troops at Kim Yam Road Headquarters and ordered them to disband. The surviving members were each paid ten Straits dollars for their services.

Dalforce is estimated to have suffered 300 casualties, of which 134 known killed were compiled by the Commonwealth War Graves Commission in 1956. Many men and women would be captured, tortured and executed in the Sook Ching massacre for their involvement in Dalforce. Quite a number of veterans were able to escape to India after Singapore fell. Others fled into the jungles and joined the Malayan Peoples' Anti-Japanese Army during the occupation.

After the war, Percival originally disparaged the Chinese community in his dispatches for not assisting the British enough during the invasion. He later changed his opinion in his book, The War in Malaya, after his dispatches circulated in Singapore, causing an outcry among the local Chinese. He praised Dalforce but still maintained that it had little impact in the battle.

Dalley was one of the people who was ordered to be evacuated from Singapore before its capitulation. He boarded a forty-foot Royal Navy motor launch known as the Mary Rose at Keppel Harbour, where it would sail to Palembang, Sumatra, part of the Dutch East Indies. The Mary Rose, commanded by veteran naval officer Captain George Mulock left Singapore a little before midnight on 14 February. They were caught by two Japanese patrol vessels and were forced to surrender. Dalley survived the war, and submitted a positive report on the unit in 1945–46.

== Media ==
Dalforce has appeared in the Singapore Broadcasting Corporation (SBC) 1984 television series The Awakening, Television Corporation Of Singapore (TCS) The Price Of Peace 1997, MediaCorp Channel 8 2001 drama In Pursuit of Peace, MediaCorp Channel 5 2001 drama A War Diary and in Canopy a 2013 film.
