= 2/18th Battalion (Australia) =

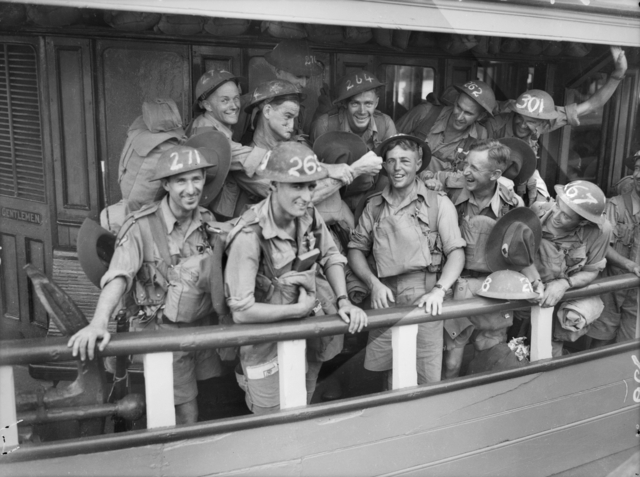
- Members of the 2/18th Battalion on board a ferry at Sydney, New South Wales, bound for the ship assigned to transport them to Malaya
- Active: 1940–1945
- Country: Australia
- Branch: Australian Army
- Type: Infantry
- Size: ~700–900 personnel (Note: At the beginning of the war, the authorised strength of an Australian infantry battalion was larger than that of the standard British infantry battalion. Following the dispatch of Australian troops to the Middle East, though, a reorganisation saw the authorised strength drop to 910 men all ranks. A further re-organisation in 1943 saw it fall to 803. Despite this, during the war the actual size of an Australian infantry battalion fluctuated between 700 and 900 men, notwithstanding combat losses.)
- Part of: 22nd Brigade, 8th Division
- Mottos: Legionis lampada tradamus (Hand on the Torch of the Legion)
- Engagements: World War II: Malayan Campaign; Battle of Singapore

Commanders
- Notable commanders: Arthur Varley

Insignia
- Unit colour patch

The 2/18th Battalion was an Australian Army infantry unit that served during World War II. Formed in June 1940, the battalion was assigned to the 22nd Brigade, which formed part of the Australian 8th Division. After completing basic training, the 2/18th was sent to Singapore and Malaya to strengthen the defences of the British colonies in February 1941 against a possible Japanese attack. The 2/18th Battalion subsequently undertook garrison duties throughout the year at various locations in Malaya, where it conducted jungle training and constructed defences along the eastern coast.

Following the outbreak of war in the Pacific in December 1941, the 2/18th saw action against Japanese forces in the Malayan campaign, during which they took part in a large-scale ambush of a Japanese force on the Malay Peninsula before joining the withdrawal to Singapore in early 1942. Assigned to defend part of the north-west coast of the island, the battalion participated in the unsuccessful defence of Singapore in early February 1942. Following the fall of Singapore the majority of the battalion's personnel were taken as prisoners of war. Many of these men died in captivity; the survivors were liberated in 1945 and returned to Australia where the battalion was disbanded.

== History ==
=== Formation ===
The 2/18th Battalion (Note: The numerical designation of 2nd AIF units was prefixed by "2/", which was used to set them apart from Militia units with corresponding numerical designations.) was raised around Sydney, in June 1940, with its first subunits being formed on 13 July at Wallgrove Camp. Formed as part of the Second Australian Imperial Force (2nd AIF) from volunteers for overseas service, the battalion's first commanding officer was Lieutenant Colonel Arthur Varley, a grazier from Inverell, New South Wales, and a World War I veteran who had previously commanded the 35th Battalion while serving in the Militia during the interwar years. The battalion concentrated at Wallgrove on 15 July, and a cadre of commissioned and senior non-commissioned officers (NCOs) who were selected from the Militia—in many cases personally by Varley—was established, while the remainder of the battalion's NCOs were appointed from recruits following their arrival.

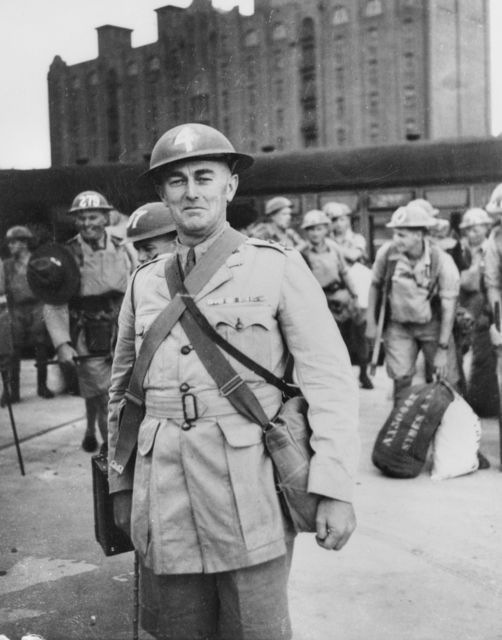
The 2/18th's first commanding officer, Lieutenant Colonel Arthur Varley, awaiting transport to Malaya with the battalion, February 1941

The majority of the battalion's personnel arrived on 27 and 28 July. Coming from across the state of New South Wales, the men were drawn from places such as Tamworth, Newcastle, Wagga, Goulburn, and Liverpool, with roughly 60 percent coming from rural backgrounds. With an authorised strength of around 900 men, the battalion was organised around a battalion headquarters, with a regimental aid post, four rifle companies and a headquarters company consisting of various support platoons and sections including signals, mortars, transport (later carriers), (Note: Shortly after being raised, the battalion received a quantity of trucks and sedans, but these were later replaced or augmented by tracked Bren carriers.) pioneers, anti-aircraft and administration.

Along with the 2/19th and 2/20th Battalions, it was assigned to the 22nd Brigade, which formed part of the 8th Division. The colours chosen for the battalion's unit colour patch (UCP) were the same as those of the 18th Battalion, a unit which had served during World War I before being raised as a Militia formation in 1921. These colours were purple over green, in a diamond shape, although a border of gray in an oval shape was added to the UCP to distinguish the battalion from its Militia counterpart; the oval shape designated the battalion as part of the 8th Division.

Basic training began at Wallgrove on 1 August, and was provided by experienced regular soldiers and personnel who had previously served in the Militia. In mid-August the battalion moved to Ingleburn, and by the end of the month individual training had been completed. Collective training followed, and on 5 October the battalion took part in a divisional march through Sydney. A further move came in November when the 2/18th was transported to Bathurst, where more complex exercises were undertaken, including at brigade and divisional levels.

Although the fighting had not yet spread to the Pacific, by late 1940 there were growing concerns among the Allies about the possibility of a war with Japan. After a review of the defences around Singapore and Malaya, the British government requested Australian troops be sent to garrison the region. In October, the Australian government committed the 22nd Brigade and supporting elements. As a result, the 2/18th—with a strength of 793 men—subsequently embarked upon the RMS Queen Mary and left Sydney on 4 February 1941, bound for Singapore. The Australian government wished to send the brigade to the Middle East to join the 6th, 7th and 9th Divisions, so the deployment was only intended to be short, as the British government pledged to release an Indian division to replace the Australians in May. Consequently, the Australian forces were deployed having only been partially trained and equipped and while they were still in the process of being brought up to full strength.

=== Malayan campaign ===
The men arrived in Singapore on 18 February 1941 and moved into barracks at Port Dickson, in the north of Malaya. While there, the battalion undertook further training to prepare it for jungle warfare, before moving to Seremban in March. Further drafts of reinforcements arrived during this time as the battalion was brought up to its wartime establishment. The rigours of jungle training and the tropical heat affected the men, and a number of personnel were hospitalised during this time with illnesses such as malaria, measles, mumps and serious tropical skin diseases. Some of these were repatriated back to Australia, and by the end of March, the 2/18th was still below its authorised establishment, with an actual strength of 898.

Amidst growing concerns among Australian military commanders about Japanese intentions, the scheduled replacement of the 22nd Brigade was cancelled, and the 2/18th remained in Seremban until they were transported east to Jemaluang in August. The following month they were sent north to Mersing, which, situated on the east coast of the Malay Peninsula, was considered a likely place for a Japanese landing as it offered a short route of advance towards Singapore. At Mersing, the battalion was set to work digging defensive positions and constructing wire obstacles, punctuated by familiarisation patrols and anti-aircraft, anti-gas and mortar training.

The battalion was placed on a war footing on 6 December as tensions in the region escalated. Two days later, the Japanese invasion of Malaya commenced; while the fighting raged elsewhere, the 2/18th remained unengaged around Mersing. On 26 December, a small group of 2/18th men were detached to an ad hoc British raiding force known as "Roseforce" to take part in a raid behind Japanese lines, ambushing a Japanese convoy. It was not until 3 January however that the battalion came into contact with the Japanese for the first time, with a patrol from the 2/18th capturing two Japanese airmen who had been shot down near the mouth of the Sekakap River. A fortnight later, Japanese advances along the peninsula to the west led to concerns about the coastal defences being outflanked and cut off. As result, on 17 January, the 2/18th was ordered to withdraw south 10 miles (16 km) to Jemaluang without having met the Japanese in battle. Following a landing around Mersing, the Japanese began to advance south towards Jemaluang in large numbers. In response, on 26 January the 2/18th Battalion, supported by two batteries of artillery from the 2/10th Field Regiment, was tasked with establishing an ambush near the Nithsdale Estate and the rubber plantation at Joo Lye.

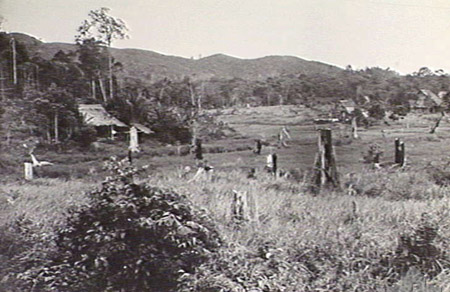
Part of the Nithsdale Estate where the 2/18th made contact with the advancing Japanese forces in January 1942. (As seen in 1945.)

Establishing themselves along the Mersing–Jemaluang road, 'D' Company was deployed to the north on the western side of the road as the lookout force, while 'B' Company was positioned further to the south on the opposite side of the road. South of them, 'A' Company formed the blocking force, with their position stretched across the road oriented to the north. Behind them, 'C' Company was positioned in reserve, further south. The plan had been for the ambush to be sprung during the day, but the Japanese advance had proceeded more slowly than thought, and it was not until after dark that they entered the ambush site. To inflict as many casualties as possible, the Japanese force, which was estimated to be battalion-sized, was allowed to pass through 'D' and 'B' Companies. By 3:00 am they came up against 'A' Company's blocking position and the ambush was finally initiated. Devastating indirect fire from artillery and mortars inflicted heavy casualties on the Japanese; however, as the northernmost company—'D'—turned south to attack the Japanese from the rear, they came up against determined resistance from a force of Japanese that had managed to infiltrate the ambush site and dig in on a small feature to the east of the estate's pig farm, north of 'B' Company. This effectively cut them off from the rest of the battalion.

Fighting raged throughout the early morning as 'B' Company vainly attempted to assist the cut-off 'D' Company. Varley decided to launch a counterattack with 'A' Company, but at 8:00 am the order to withdraw came from brigade headquarters, cancelling the attack. Covered by the reserve company, 'A' and some of 'B' Company were able to break contact and fall back. 'D' Company, along with those of 'B' Company that were still isolated and in contact, had to be left to fight their way back to the battalion's lines. By the time they arrived, there were only enough men left to form one platoon. The 2/18th's losses in this action amounted to about 90 men killed, wounded or missing. Japanese losses are unknown, but are thought to be significant (Note: Smith suggests a figure of up to 1,000 killed, but this seems high considering the probable size of the Japanese force, which was estimated at battalion-strength.) and they were unable to take Jemaluang for two more days.

=== Fighting in Singapore ===
After the withdrawal from Nithsdale, the battalion fell back along the Jemaluang–Kota Tinggi Road, before helping to cover the Allied withdrawal over the Johor–Singapore Causeway to Singapore Island. No engagements were fought during this phase, but the 2/18th patrolled constantly and provided rearguard detachments. During this time, the battalion was briefly commanded by Major William Fraser, when Varley temporarily took over Eastforce, which consisted of the 22nd Brigade and a number of Indian and Malay formations, filling in for Brigadier Harold Burfield Taylor, who was temporarily detached to organise a force to cover the withdrawal. Following its arrival on the island, Varley returned to the battalion, which received a small number of reinforcements—about 90 men—and was allocated to the defence of the Western Area along with the rest of the 8th Division. Forming part of the 22nd Brigade's defensive line in the north-west sector, stretching from the Causeway to the Sungei Berih, the battalion was responsible for defending a frontage of 3 miles (4.8 km). With a strength of 37 officers and 826 other ranks, the battalion occupied a position in the centre of the brigade that stretched from the 2/20th's position around Kranji to the 2/19th's around Sungei Sarimbun, north-east of the village of Ama Keng and Tengah Airfield.

Consisting of "tidal mud flats and mangrove swamps intersected with streams and inlets", there had been no work done to prepare the area that the battalion was allocated to defend prior to its arrival due to political concerns about alarming the local population. The wide frontage stretched the 2/18th thin on the ground, with no depth and large gaps between positions that were separated in places by tidal waterways. Due to the thick vegetation along the shoreline, the battalion's positions had the added handicap of poor visibility of the water and limited fields of fire that, combined with their isolation, meant that they were unable to support each other. After occupying their positions on 1 February, the battalion worked to improve them as best they could, working under the cover of darkness so as to avoid Japanese artillery and air attacks.

The Japanese attack on the north-west coast came on the night of 8/9 February, beginning with a heavy artillery and aerial bombardment of the 22nd Brigade's positions throughout the day, followed by a waterborne assault across the Johore Strait, which began around 10:30 pm. Confronted by 16 battalions from the Japanese 5th and 18th Divisions, which concentrated upon the 2/18th's and 2/20th's positions, the 2/18th's two forward companies—'A' and 'C'—strongly resisted two frontal assaults during the day. Heavy casualties were inflicted on the Japanese over the course of several hours, but the defenders were eventually forced back by heavy indirect fire and overwhelming numbers. Exploiting the holes in the battalion's perimeter to avoid resistance, by 1:30 am on 9 February the Japanese had penetrated towards battalion headquarters near the Lim Chau Kang road, threatening to roll up the battalion's rear. Varley then ordered the forward companies to make a fighting withdrawal and fall back on battalion headquarters. Heavy fighting followed, during which the Australians suffered grave losses as groups became lost in the darkness in the thick country, before the battalion was able to re-establish itself around Ama Keng.

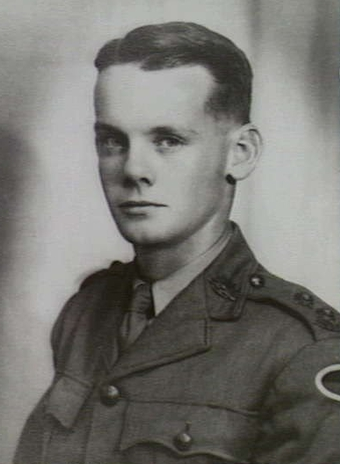
Lieutenant Iven John Mackay, who led a section from the 2/18th's carrier platoon in a counterattack up Reformatory Road during the fighting in Singapore on 11 February 1942.

The 2/18th attempted to defend the Tengah Airfield, but by 1:00 pm on 9 February they had been reduced to only 330 men and were withdrawn back to the south-east of the airfield, occupying a position around Bulim along the Chu Kang Road, with the 2/29th Battalion on their left. Throughout the night of 9/10 February, minor clashes occurred as patrols were sent out to fend off Japanese probes. The battalion continued to hold the line until 6:00 am when, following receipt of orders to withdraw, it moved back to Keat Hong village to take up the role of brigade reserve. The carrier platoon covered the battalion's withdrawal, and amidst heavy artillery shelling, they ambushed two Japanese columns, each roughly company-sized, inflicting heavy casualties upon them with their Vickers machine-guns before breaking contact.

As a result of a misinterpretation of orders, the 22nd Brigade fell back towards Reformatory Road where the 2/18th took up positions to the west between the junctions of the Ulu Pandan and Bukit Timah Roads. When the brigade launched a counterattack later that day, the majority of the battalion was held back in reserve, after suffering many casualties. A single company, though, was detached at this time to an ad hoc formation dubbed "X Battalion", tasked with launching a counterattack. Meanwhile, the rest of the battalion moved back into the reserve position along the Bukit Panjang Road.

That evening the 2/18th occupied a position north of a feature dubbed "127" (1°19'24.9"N, 103°46'14.6"E), but early on the morning of 11 February they were moved back south of there to gain better fields of fire. Shortly after this, the 2/18th came under attack from front and rear after the Japanese managed to infiltrate behind their position, forcing the 2/18th to fall back further under the cover of the fire from the carriers once again. Later during 11 February, the 22nd Brigade headquarters, situated around Wai Soon Gardens (1°19'16.6"N 103°46'13.2"E), came under attack from a Japanese force moving south from Bukit Timah. In response, the 2/18th launched a counterattack across Reformatory Road (now named Clementi Road) with bayonets. At the same time, a section from the battalion's carrier platoon, under the command of Lieutenant Iven John Mackay, son of Lieutenant General Iven Giffard Mackay, conducted a daring attack that stopped the Japanese advance. Rolling up the axis of the road, firing machine-guns and hurling grenades, they advanced to the Bukit Timah Road before heading south along Holland Road (now called Old Holland Road) and then returning to battalion headquarters.

After this, the 22nd Brigade moved back towards the junction of Holland and Ulu Padan Roads. Moving while under heavy fire, the battalion established itself in its new position before 9:00 am, but in the confusion of the move, some men found themselves separated from the main body and cut off. In the afternoon, after the brigade position was reoriented to the west, the battalion was placed in reserve. The battalion's positions in the north, situated on the high ground, experienced heavy attack from Japanese aircraft and artillery, as the brigade—supported by Australian and British artillery—fought off two regiments from the Japanese 18th Division during the course of the night of 11/12 February.

Early the following morning, Varley was promoted to brigadier and took over as commander of the 22nd Brigade from Taylor, who was taken ill. In Varley's place, Major Charles O'Brien, who had previously been the battalion second-in-command, took over command of the battalion. After a brief lull in the fighting in the 22nd Brigade's sector, the Japanese 18th Division attacked again, attempting to take the brigade on its left flank. In response, the 2/18th was sent to retake some of the high ground south-east of the Ulu Pandan and Reformatory Roads late in the afternoon. Attacking with about 60 men, supported by three British armoured cars and artillery fire, they were unable to retake the position after the light failed. The Japanese then pressed heavily against the 22nd Brigade's position, and they were forced to give ground, falling back to the junction of Buona Vista and Holland Roads (an area now called Holland Village where there was a Hakka cemetery on two hills), by which time the 2/18th was down to only 250 men.

On 13 February, in an attempt to gain room for a possible counterattack, the Allied commander, Lieutenant General Arthur Percival, ordered a shortening of the Allied lines towards the south-east and the formation of a 25-mile (40 km) perimeter around Singapore city. As a part of this, the Australian forces were concentrated into a 7-mile (11 km) perimeter centred around Farrer and Holland Roads, about 2 miles (3.2 km) west of the city, tasked with defending the north-east sector of the defensive line. The 2/18th was positioned among the gravestones of Cemetery Hill (Shuang Long Shan Hakka cemetery, which was on two hills around Holland Village), and apart from a few minor skirmishes and overflights by Japanese aircraft spotting for artillery, a period of respite followed in the Australian sector. The Japanese skirted the position, moving in an easterly direction towards the city, by way of gaps in the line which opened to the north and south of the Australians through positions held by British, Indian and Malay units.

The Japanese continued to advance into the outskirts of Singapore throughout 14 February. Threatened with being isolated, the Australians made plans to make a last stand. With the Japanese closing in, the island's civilian population began to suffer heavily as they were subjected to heavy artillery bombardment and aerial attacks from Japanese aircraft that were increasingly unopposed as anti-aircraft guns ran out of ammunition. Supplies of water and food also dwindled, and the water shortage was made worse by the loss of the island's reservoirs. Finally, in the morning of 15 February, after the Japanese had succeeded in infiltrating towards Mount Pleasant Ridge, Percival determined that a counterattack was not viable and instead decided to surrender the garrison. The battalion's final involvement in the fighting came that afternoon when 'A' and 'D' Companies were heavily shelled. A short time later, at 8:30 pm, the surrender came into effect and the men of the 2/18th received orders not to escape.

=== Prisoners of war ===
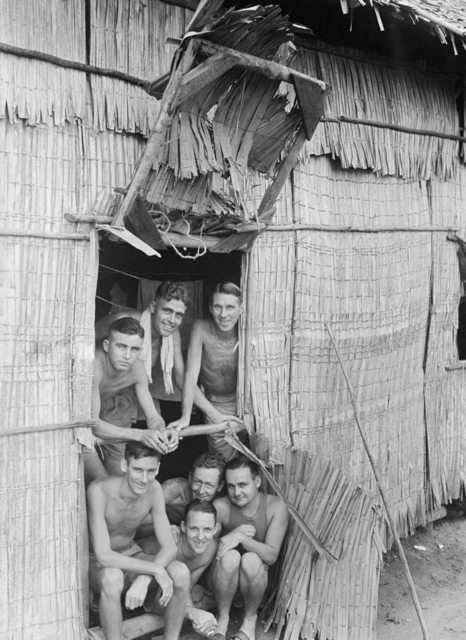
Members of the 2/18th in a hut at Changi at the end of the war

While the majority of the 2/18th obeyed the order not to escape following the surrender, a small number of men attempted to evade capture. Along with other members of the battalion who had found themselves cut off from the rest of the battalion earlier in the fighting, they attempted to make their way back to Allied lines via Sumatra. There, some were eventually captured, while others managed to get away to Ceylon. Of these, 24 eventually managed to return to Australia, some of whom were transferred to other units and later took part in further fighting in New Guinea. When the Japanese arrived to effect the capture of the 2/18th, six men from the carrier platoon, which had earlier inflicted heavy casualties upon the Japanese during the fighting, were ordered to move the battalion's carriers, before being tied up and executed. Four other 2/18th soldiers were killed in the massacre at the Alexandra Hospital. The surviving members of the battalion were then marched 25 miles (40 km) to the prisoner of war camp at Changi.

Shortly afterwards, the men were split up and sent to various locations to serve as forced labourers. The majority of the 2/18th's personnel were sent to Blakang Mati, but some remained in Changi, while others were sent to Japan or were sent to work on the Thai–Burma Railway. A total of 174 men were sent to Borneo where in 1945 they were subjected to the Sandakan Death Marches, which only about ten percent of the 2/18th men survived. Despite being separated, though, wherever possible the 2/18th men sought to stay together in their groups and the battalion structure was maintained even in captivity. The battalion's first commanding officer, Varley, was one of those sent to Burma where, as senior Allied officer, he worked to secure the welfare of over 9,000 men working on the railway, including many from the 2/18th. He was later sent to Thailand before being brought back to Singapore once work was completed. In late 1944 he was transferred to Formosa. On 12 September, while en route, SS Rakuyo Maru, the transport ship on which he and around 1,250 other prisoners were travelling was torpedoed by a US submarine, USS Sealion. Varley took charge of several lifeboats of prisoners during the evacuation, attempting to lead them to safety. They were never seen again and are believed to have been machine-gunned several days later by Japanese frigates that were in the area.

During their time in captivity, men from the 2/18th undertook a number of subversive activities including building a radio transmitter, which they used to contact local resistance groups who provided them with assistance in the form of medicine and intelligence. They were also involved in numerous escape attempts, some of which were successful, alongside Australians from other units. One of these successful escapes involved a group of eight men who escaped from the camp on Berhala Island in two groups. One group escaped while out of camp on a work detail, while the other simply walked out the front gate to use the ablutions and never came back. After meeting up outside the camp, the men split up again. One group included Lieutenant Charles Wagner, who had previously been decorated with the Distinguished Conduct Medal for his actions around the Nithsdale Estate and who had been commissioned in the field. Having bribed one of the camp guards, Wagner's group had contacted the local guerillas and arranged to rendezvous with a fishing vessel. After hiding out for three weeks, the vessel eventually arrived offshore and took them on board. The group then met up with the other escapees on Tawi-Tawi where in mid-1943 they began working with the Filipino guerilla forces, fighting alongside them until the end of the war. Other escapes occurred later in the war, including one in which five men escaped from Ranau over the course of two days in early July 1945 during one of the death marches. After effecting their escape, these men were helped by locals who provided food and information, before the men were able to meet up with some Australians from Z Special Unit.

Following the end of the war in August 1945, the men that survived as prisoners of war were repatriated to Australia. Returning by aircraft and ship, this was largely completed by October, and later that year the battalion was officially disbanded. A total of 1,323 men served in the battalion throughout its existence, including reinforcements and personnel that were transferred. The battalion's battle casualties amounted to 80 killed and 10 wounded in Malaya, as well as 175 killed and 238 wounded in Singapore. On top of this 225 men from the 2/18th died in captivity as prisoners of war. (Note: These figures vary from those provided by the Australian War Memorial, which states that the battalion had 562 dead and 124 wounded.) For their involvement in the war, members of the battalion received the following decorations: one Military Cross, two Distinguished Conduct Medals, one Military Medal, two Members of the Order of the British Empire, and 11 Mentions in Despatches. (Note: There is a discrepancy in these figures compared to those provided by the Australian War Memorial, which provides: one MC, two DCMs, one MM and 13 MIDs.)

== Battle honours ==
The 2/18th Battalion received the following battle honours:

- Malaya 1941–1942, Johore, Jemaluang, and Singapore Island. (Note: These battle honours were subsequently entrusted to the Royal New South Wales Regiment in 1961.)

== Commanding officers ==
The following officers served as commanding officer of the 2/18th:

- Lieutenant Colonel Arthur Varley;
- Major William Fraser; and
- Major Charles O'Brien.
