= Kranji Reservoir Park =

Park in Singapore

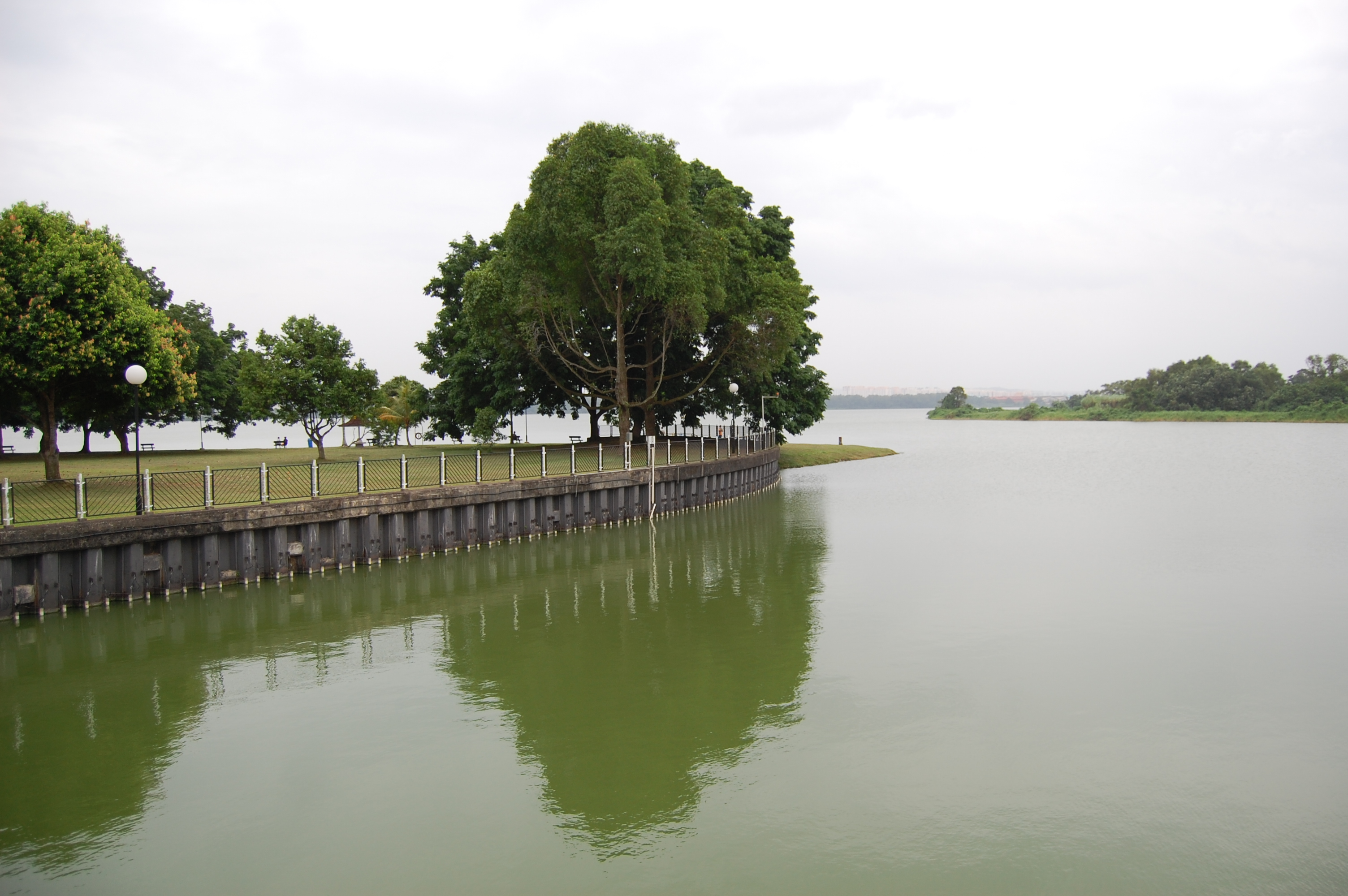
- Kranji Reservoir Park

- Location within Singapore
- Type: Riverline park
- Location: Kranji, Singapore
- Coordinates: 1°26′22.9″N 103°44′16.1″E
- Area: 9 hectares (22 acres)
- Operator: National Parks Board
- Status: Open
- Website: www.nparks.gov.sg/gardens-parks-and-nature/parks-and-nature-reserves/kranji-reservoir-park

Kranji Reservoir Park is a 9-hectare park located next to Kranji Reservoir along Kranji Way in Singapore. It overlooks Johor Straits and is a favourite hotspot among fishing enthusiasts and weekend picnickers. Facilities include seventeen fishing grounds, pavilions and benches. The park's two fishing grounds Z and F are opened from 6 a.m. to 11 p.m. daily. A war memorial plaque at the park serves to honor the brave soldiers who died while resisting the Japanese invasion during the Battle of Kranji in World War II.

== See also ==
- List of parks in Singapore
