= Harold Burfield Taylor =

Australian military officer and analytical chemist

Harold Taylor
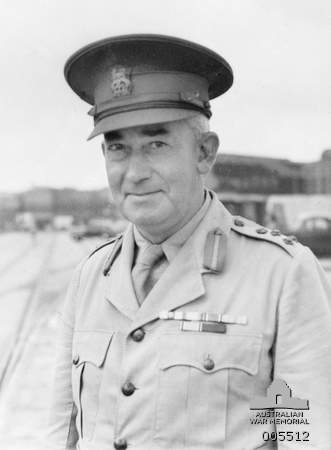
- Brigadier Harold Taylor in 1941
- Born: 10 August 1890; Enfield, New South Wales, Australia
- Died: 15 March 1966 (aged 75); Concord, New South Wales, Australia
- Military career
- Allegiance: Australia
- Branch: Australian Army
- Service years: 1909–1946
- Rank: Brigadier
- Commands: 22nd Brigade (1940–42); 5th Brigade (1939–40); 30th Battalion (1935–39); 18th Battalion (1929–33); Sydney University Regiment (1927–29); Sydney University Scouts (1926–27)
- Conflicts: First World War; Western Front; Second World War; Malayan campaign; Fall of Singapore
- Awards: Military Cross & Bar; Colonial Auxiliary Forces Officers' Decoration
- Other work: Analytical chemist

Brigadier Harold Burfield Taylor, MC & Bar, VD (10 August 1890 – 15 March 1966) was an analytical chemist and an Australian Army officer who served in the First and the Second World Wars. A junior officer in the First World War, during the Second World War he was commander of the 22nd Infantry Brigade during the Japanese invasion of Malaya. Captured along with many of his fellow soldiers following the fall of Singapore, he spent the remainder of the war as a prisoner of war. In civilian life, he was an analyst for the government and an expert in poisons, often called upon to give evidence in criminal trials involving poisoning.

== Early life and scientific career ==
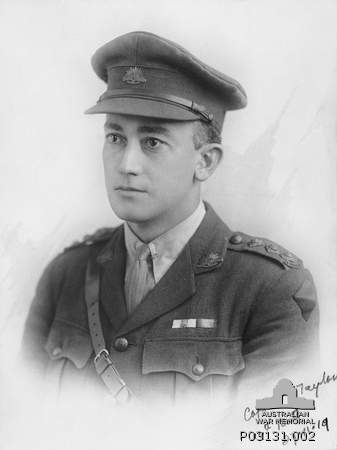
Taylor, as a captain, 1919

Taylor was born on 10 August 1890 in Enfield, Sydney to Ernest Taylor, a civil servant originally from England, and his Australian wife, Louisa née Chowne. He was educated at Sydney Boys' High School and the University of Sydney, where he graduated Bachelor of Science in 1912. Interested in chemistry and military science, he served with the Sydney University Scouts (a Militia unit), and was commissioned in 1913.

Taylor commenced his analytic career as assistant government analyst in the New South Wales Department of Public Health in 1915. While his work involved analysis of a wide range of products, he became well known for giving evidence in criminal trials involving poisons.

== First World War ==
Taylor volunteered for the Australian Imperial Force (AIF) in 1915 and, commissioned as a second lieutenant in September that year, was assigned to 19th Battalion. The battalion at the time was involved in training in Egypt following the Gallipoli Campaign, before embarking in March 1916 to France for service on the Western Front.

The battalion engaged in the trench warfare that was typical of the front, and took part in the Battle of Pozières. Prior to this, in June, Taylor had been promoted to lieutenant. Early the following year, he was promoted again, this time to captain. At Lagnicourt, Taylor's leadership of his company was crucial in defeating a German attack during the second phase of the Battle of Arras on 15 April, and he was rewarded with a Military Cross (MC).

Taylor was recommended for a Bar to his MC on 9 October 1917. This was for his actions during the Battle of Poelcappelle which was part of the Battle of Passchendaele, when he led a small force of two companies to capture German positions in Daisy Wood, near Ypres. The citation for the Bar, appearing in The London Gazette in April 1918, read:

For conspicuous gallantry and devotion to duty when held up during an advance. Taking with him one officer and ten other ranks, he attacked the position and succeeded in capturing it, taking fifteen of the enemy prisoners, wounding numerous others, and putting the remainder to flight.

He continued to serve with the battalion until the end of the war, brought about by the armistice with Germany on 11 November 1918, and, upon his return to Australia, was discharged from the AIF the following year.

== Interwar period ==
Taylor recommenced his analytical work, authoring or co-authoring a number of papers pertaining to chemical analysis of coal and lead amongst other substances. He also completed extensive work in relation to the preservation of milk and earned a Doctor of Science in 1925 from the University of Sydney. By 1934, he was Deputy Government Analyst of New South Wales.

Taylor also continued to be involved with the militia, having resumed his militia career in 1920. A battalion commander by 1926, he was promoted to lieutenant colonel in July 1927 and continued to be appointed to command various militia battalions, including the 18th and 56th battalions.

== Second World War ==
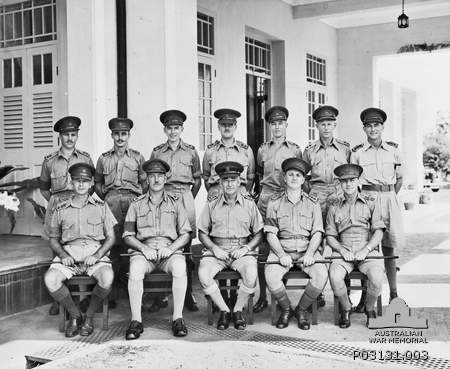
Taylor, centre front, with officers of the 22nd Australian Infantry Brigade, Malaya, 1941

Shortly after the outbreak of the Second World War in September 1939, in late October Taylor was promoted to the temporary rank of brigadier and given command of 5th Brigade, a militia formation which then tasked with defensive duties in Australia. In July 1940, he was seconded to the AIF, which had been raised for service overseas, and appointed commander of 22nd Infantry Brigade. The brigade was composed of 2/18th, 2/19th and 2/20th battalions and was subordinate to the 8th Division; this was initially commanded by Vernon Sturdee but he would shortly be made Army chief of staff, with Major General Gordon Bennett taking over command of the division in his stead. The brigade was originally destined for the Middle East but the Australian government offered to send it to Singapore to shore up Britain's defences, an offer gratefully accepted by the British prime minister, Winston Churchill.

=== Malaya and Singapore ===
After a period of training in New South Wales, the brigade embarked for Malaya on 2 February 1941 with Taylor travelling in advance of the main body by flying boat. He spent time gauging the current training methods in use amongst the British and Indian units already stationed in Malaya. Observing the terrain in which his soldiers may have to fight, he implemented acclimatisation and jungle warfare training for his brigade.

The brigade was based at Mersing, and spent time constructing defences and laying minefields. It also underwent brigade level training exercises and it was during one of these exercises that Taylor clashed with Bennett, his new commanding officer. Taylor's relationship with Bennett was difficult. Bennett's command in Malaya at the time consisted solely of Taylor's brigade, with other elements of the 8th Division to follow. This meant that Bennett's oversight was more overbearing than would normally be the case and this resulted in disputes over the use and distribution of his brigade. Following the invasion of Malaya by the Japanese Empire, the brigade was forced into fighting rear guard actions against the advancing Japanese. This led to more clashes with Bennett, who felt that Taylor, by requesting to establish fallback positions, was too pessimistic in his defence arrangements.

The brigade later withdrew to Singapore Island, its three battalions taking up positions across an eight-mile front on the north western coast of the island. On the night of 8 February, the Japanese launched landings on Taylor's sector, forcing his brigade into a fighting withdrawal. The Japanese advance may have been assisted by Taylor's directions to his platoon and company commanders to withdraw back to their headquarters position if they felt in danger of being overrun.

By 12 February, the Japanese were well established on Singapore Island and advancing on all fronts. That day Taylor, extremely fatigued, asked Lieutenant Colonel Arthur Varley, commander of 2/18th Battalion, to take over temporary command of the brigade. The following day, Bennett promoted Varley to brigadier and made him the permanent commander of the brigade, a command which would last only a few more days before the surrender of Singapore on 15 February.

Taylor spent the remainder of the war as a prisoner of war of the Japanese. While imprisoned at Changi, he set up and ran an educational program dubbed the Changi University for his fellow prisoners which was significantly diminished as men were transferred to other camps. Sent to prisoner camps in Taiwan and then Manchuria, his scientific knowledge was of benefit in ensuring his fellow prisoners maximised their nutritional intake from the limited rations provided by the Japanese.

== Later life ==
Returning to his scientific career upon his return to Australia after the Second World War, Taylor became the government analyst in March 1946. He continued to be called upon to advise in criminal cases involving poisons, including those by the multiple murderer Caroline Grills. He retired from public service in 1954 although worked as a consultant for several more years. At the time of his retirement he was working on setting standards for the amount of fruit in juices and jams.

Taylor died while under hospital care at Concord on 15 March 1966. He was survived by his wife, Nellie Birkenhead Starling, whom he married in 1940. The couple had no children.

== Publications ==
- Badham, Charles; Taylor, Harold Burfield (1925), Lead poisoning : concerning the standards which should be used in diagnosing this industrial disease, together with a new method for the determination of lead in urine, Sydney, NSW: Govt. Printer
- Badham, Charles; Taylor, Harold Burfield (1938), The lungs of coal, metalliferous and sandstone miners and other workers in New South Wales : chemical analysis and pathology, Sydney, NSW: Govt. Printer
- Badham, Charles; Taylor, Harold Burfield (1941), The lungs of coal miners in New South Wales : chemical analysis and pathology, Sydney, NSW: Govt. Printer
