= 22nd Brigade (Australia) =

Infantry brigade of the Australian Army during World War II

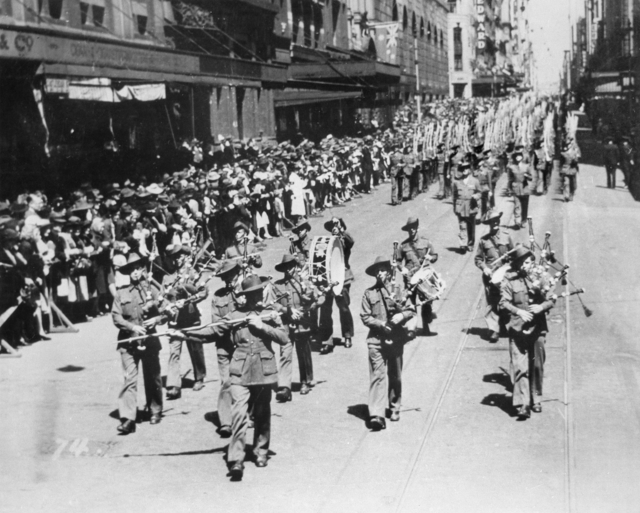
- Elements of the 22nd Brigade marching down Castlereagh Street in Sydney on 15 September 1940
- Active: 1912–1921; 1940–1942
- Country: Australia
- Branch: Australian Army
- Type: Infantry
- Size: Brigade
- Part of: 8th Division (1940–42)
- Engagements: World War II: Malayan Campaign; Battle of Singapore

Commanders
- Notable commanders: Harold Taylor; Arthur Varley

Insignia
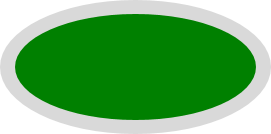
- Headquarters unit colour patch

The 22nd Brigade was a brigade-sized infantry unit of the Australian Army. It was briefly raised in 1912 as a Militia formation providing training as part of the compulsory training scheme. Later, during World War II, the brigade was raised as part of the all volunteer Second Australian Imperial Force in April 1940. Assigned to the 8th Division, in early 1941 the brigade was deployed to British Malaya, where it formed part of the defensive garrison that was established there by the British, eventually establishing its headquarters in the Mersing–Endau area.

In early 1942, following the Japanese invasion of Malaya, the brigade participated in the Malayan Campaign, fighting along the eastern coast before being forced to withdraw to Singapore as the Japanese advanced along the Malayan peninsula. The brigade later fought in the Battle of Singapore. Occupying the north-western sector of the island, the brigade was subjected to the weight of the main Japanese assault on 8/9 February 1942 and after heavy fighting was pushed back towards the centre of the island. Further actions were fought throughout the following week as Allied forces withdrew towards Singapore town. On 15 February, the garrison surrendered and the surviving members of the 22nd Brigade were captured. They spent the next 3 1/2 years in Japanese captivity in camps across south-east Asia and Japan, during which many died from the harsh conditions. At war's end in August 1945, the surviving members were liberated and returned to Australia.

== History ==
The 22nd Brigade briefly existed as Militia brigade that was partially formed in 1912, following the introduction of the compulsory training scheme. At this time, it was assigned to the 5th Military District. The brigade's constituent units were spread across various locations in Western Australia including Fremantle, Victoria Park, Bunbury, Cottesloe, Subiaco, Perth, Guildford and Geraldton. The brigade's battalions were sequentially numbered: 86th, 87th, 88th and 89th. The brigade was not raised as part of the First Australian Imperial Force (AIF) during World War I, although it remained on the Australian Army's order of battle as a Militia formation in Australia during the war. It was not re-raised in the interwar years when the Militia was reorganised to replicate the numerical designations of the AIF in 1921.

During World War II, the 22nd Brigade was re-raised as part of the all volunteer Second Australian Imperial Force. Established on 15 July 1940 as part of the 8th Australian Division, the brigade's headquarters was opened at Wallgrove, New South Wales. Under the command of Brigadier Harold Taylor, the brigade consisted of three infantry battalions – the 2/18th, 2/19th and 2/20th – and was supported by the 2/10th Field Regiment, which was initially equipped with World War I-vintage Ordnance QF 18-pounders. In August, after basic training was completed, the brigade concentrated around Ingleburn to begin more involved collective training. A further move to Bathurst in November 1940.

Following a request from the British government, the 22nd Brigade, along with support troops – a force of over 5,000 personnel – were deployed to Malaya in February 1941, as the likelihood of war with Japan grew. Upon arrival, the brigade was deployed as a reserve element, and was based around Port Dickson, Kuala Lumpur and Malacca. Initially, it was planned to relieve the brigade after a few months, so that it could be redeployed to the Middle East, but this did not happen and ultimately the brigade was reinforced by the 27th Brigade. After this, the 22nd Brigade was released from the reserve role, as the 8th Division was allocated to the defence of eastern Johore, and the brigade subsequently moved to Jemaluang in August. The following month, forward positions were occupied around Mersing and Endau where the brigade began constructing fixed defences along the coast around potential landing areas.

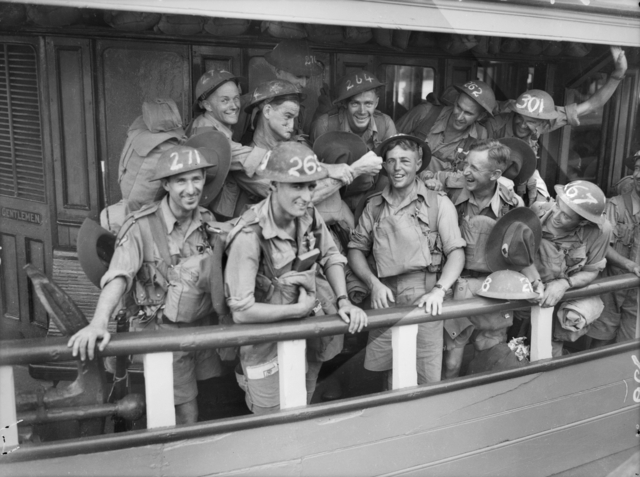
Members of the 22nd Brigade on board a ferry at Sydney, New South Wales, bound for the ship assigned to transport them to Malaya

When the Japanese invasion of Malaya began on 8 December 1941, the brigade was initially out of the action, as the fighting took place in other sectors. In mid-January 1942, the brigade was placed under the command of the Indian III Corps, as the 8th Division's headquarters assumed control of actions and units along the western coast of Malaya, assuming the designation "Westforce", while the eastern forces came under 22nd Brigade as "Eastforce", assuming control of a battalion of Dogras and Jats as well as elements of the local Johore state forces. As the fighting intensified in the west, the 2/19th Battalion was detached from the 22nd Brigade to take part in the Battle of Muar, during which its commanding officer, Lieutenant Colonel Charles Anderson, led an ad hoc force of Australian and Indian soldiers in a fighting withdrawal. For his actions, he was later awarded the Victoria Cross.

This led to the redeployment of the 2/18th Battalion to the Nithsdale Estate, while the 2/20th remained around Mersing, where they subsequently fought several minor actions against the advancing Japanese before a larger action took place around the Mersing River as the battalion fought to retain control of the vital road bridge. Ultimately, the Japanese gained the bridge and the brigade was ordered to withdraw to Jamaluang. Following a Japanese landing around Endau, the 2/18th Battalion carried out a successful ambush around Nithsdale, although this was followed by a further withdrawal to the crossroads around Kota Tinggi. The 2/19th returned to the 22nd Brigade at this time, and it was joined by the 2nd Battalion, Gordon Highlanders. Together they subsequently took up rearguard positions north of the causeway that led to Singapore, and held the line until 1 February, when they withdrew just before engineers blew up a large span to delay the advancing Japanese.

On Singapore, the Australians were reinforced by elements of the newly arrived 2/4th Machine Gun Battalion, while the 2/19th received a large batch of barely trained recruits who had been hastily deployed from depots in Australia. Amidst hasty preparations for the defence of the island, the 22nd Brigade assumed defensive positions in the north-western sector of the island. Here their lines were longer than normal, and interspersed with mangroves and swamps that made the ground difficult to defend. After only a brief interlude, the Japanese began their assault on Singapore on the night of 8/9 February, with two division's crossing the Johore Strait and landing in the 22nd Brigade's area. Throughout the night, heavy fighting took place during the Battle of Sarimbun Beach as the Japanese infiltrated the sector, bypassing outposts that became isolated and cutting off many of the defenders. Subsequently, the surviving members of the three 22nd Brigade battalions fell back towards the airfield at Tengah. Further fighting took place around Bulim, where the 2/18th fought a delaying action along with remnants of the 2/19th and 2/20th Battalions, which were hastily reorganised as "Merritt Force". By 10 February, the 22nd Brigade had been pushed back to Ulu Pandan. Here, several ad hoc battalions were joined and reorganised for a counter-attack, although this ultimately did not come to fruition as the tempo of the Japanese advance disrupted and dislocated the defending troops. A further withdrawal followed after the Japanese destroyed one of the assembling ad hoc battalions.

As the Allied perimeter continued shrink around the town, the 8th Division units were brought together around Tanglin Barracks, where they remained until the garrison surrendered on 15 February. In the final stages of the fighting, Taylor was relieved of command due to exhaustion, with the commander of the 2/18th Battalion, Lieutenant Colonel Arthur Varley, being promoted to brigadier. In the aftermath, the 22nd Brigade's surviving personnel were taken prisoner and subsequently sent to camps around south-east Asia and Japan. Conditions were harsh and many of the soldiers died in captivity before the survivors were liberated when the war ended in August 1945.

== Units ==
The following units were assigned to the 22nd Brigade:

- 2/18th Battalion (1940–1942)
- 2/19th Battalion (1940–1942)
- 2/20th Battalion (1940–1942)
- 2/10th Field Regiment (1940–1942)
- 2/4th Machine Gun Battalion (February 1942)

== Commanders ==
The following officers commanded the 22nd Brigade during the war:

- Brigadier Harold Taylor (15 July 1940 – 11 February 1942)
- Brigadier Arthur Varley (12–15 February 1942)
