= Frank Brewer =

British colonial administrator (1915–1987)

Frank Brewer CMG OBE

Secretary for Defence of the Federation of Malaya
- In office 1957–1959

Personal details
- Born: 1915
- Died: 21 December 1987 (aged 71–72)
- Education: Pembroke College, Oxford
- Occupation: Colonial administrator and civil servant

Frank Brewer (1915 – 21 December 1987) was a British civil servant and colonial administrator who served as Secretary for Defence of the Federation of Malaya from 1957 to 1959.

== Early life and education ==
Brewer was born in 1915, the son of Lewis Arthur Brewer. He was educated at Commonweal School, Swindon and Pembroke College, Oxford.

== Career ==
Brewer joined the Malay Civil Service in 1937, and during the following year was sent to Amoy to study Chinese. On his return to Malaya, he was appointed acting assistant Protector of Chinese at Penang and also served as Food Controller. In 1941, after the outbreak of World War II, Brewer enrolled in the Special Forces, and was captured by the Japanese and incarcerated as a POW in Sumatra.

After the War, Brewer returned to Malaya and was attached to the Labour Department as assistant Controller of Labour in Singapore. In 1947, he was appointed a member of the Wages Commission to consider conditions of service of government employees. In 1951, he was serving as Deputy Commissioner of Labour for Penang, and in the following year as Deputy Secretary for Chinese Affairs and as a member of the Penang Council. From 1955 to 1957, he served as Deputy Chief Secretary of the Federation of Malaya, and in 1957 was appointed Secretary for Defence of the Federation of Malaya, a post he held until his retirement in 1959 under the Malayanisation programme.

After returning to England in 1959, the following year Brewer entered the Foreign Office where he served until 1976.

== Personal life and death ==
Brewer married Eileen Marian née Shepherd in 1950.

Brewer died on 21 December 1987.

== Honours ==
Brewer was appointed Companion of the Order of St Michael and St George (CMG) in the 1960 New Year Honours. He was appointed Officer of the Order of the British Empire (OBE) in the 1953 New Year Honours.
