= 2/10th Field Regiment (Australia) =

Australian Army field artillery unit

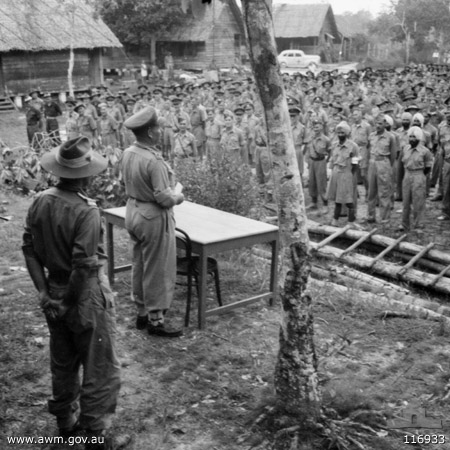
- Liberated troops, including those from the 2/10th, at the Japanese surrender at Kuching, September 1945
- Active: 1940–45
- Country: Australia
- Type: Regiment
- Role: Artillery
- Part of: 22nd Brigade, 8th Division
- Engagements: World War II: Malayan Campaign; Singapore

Insignia
- Unit colour patch

The 2/10th Field Regiment was an Australian Army artillery regiment formed in mid-1940 as part of the Second Australian Imperial Force during World War II. The regiment was deployed to Malaya in 1941, taking part there in the military actions against the Japanese, and then deployed to Singapore in early 1942. When the garrison was surrendered, the majority of the regiment were taken prisoner and remained in captivity until the end of the war in August 1945.

== History ==
Raised as part of the 8th Division, the regiment was formed at Redbank, Queensland. Under the command of Lieutenant Colonel G.H. Kirkwood, the regiment initially consisted of two batteries of First World War-vintage 18-pounders; these were designated as the 19th and 20th Batteries. Later, in January 1941, the regiment was expanded to a third battery, initially designated as X Battery before being redesignated as the 60th. The following month, the regiment moved by rail to Sydney, where they embarked for overseas, deploying to Malaya, where they joined the 22nd Brigade Group, which had been sent to help bolster the British garrison. When the regiment deployed, it also possessed some 4.5-inch howitzers.

Initially based in Malacca and Tranquerah, the regiment later moved to Mersing on the east coast, where the 22nd Brigade took up defensive positions. A period of training followed, including a brigade level exercise, although the effectiveness of this training was limited due to self imposed peace-time restrictions that precluded realistic training. In November 1941, Lieutenant Colonel A.W. Walsh assumed command of the regiment.

During the initial fighting in the Malayan Campaign after the Japanese invasion on 8 December, the regiment was not actively engaged. In early January 1942, they were re-equipped with 25-pounders and on 21 January they provided support for Australian troops fighting around the Mersing–Endau Road. For the rest of the month, the regiment participated in further actions as the British and Commonwealth troops were forced back along the Malay Peninsula towards Johore. On 27 January, the regiment took part in a fighting withdrawal from the east coast, supporting the 22nd Brigade; during this action, the 2/10th was heavily engaged, firing 900 rounds in the first hour alone.

In early February, after withdrawing across the Johore Causeway to Singapore Island, the two Australian brigades – the 22nd and 27th – took up defensive positions, the 22nd in the western sector and the 27th in the north in preparation for a Japanese assault. Within the defensive plan, the 2/10th was responsible for covering the causeway sector. Around this time, the regiment had twenty-four 25-pounder field guns and six 4.5-inch howitzers. On 8 February, the Japanese assault came from across the Johore Strait, falling predominately upon the 22nd Brigade's positions. Prior to the attack, the regiment had formed an extra troop of guns equipped with 4.5-inch howitzers as well spare 18-pounders, and during the assault these were used to fire on sampans carrying Japanese troops across the water. Although they sunk over 30 of them, the defenders were overwhelmed and pushed back inland. Over the course of the next week, the regiment was heavily engaged, firing thousands of rounds and continuing to fire its guns until the end of the campaign, which ended when the British garrison commander, Lieutenant General Arthur Percival, ordered a surrender. During the fighting on Singapore, the regiment lost six killed, 18 wounded and three missing.

After this, the regiment's personnel became prisoners of war. Over the next three-and-a-half years, they were scattered throughout the Pacific to camps in Singapore, Malaya, Borneo, Thailand, Burma, Taiwan and Japan. Subjected to poor conditions and used for hard labour, many of the 834 men from the 2/10th who were captured were killed or died in captivity; a total of 270 men; before being freed when the war ended in August 1945. The regiment's casualties during the war amounted to 286 killed and 16 wounded.

== Bibliography ==
- Horner, David (1995). The Gunners: A History of Australian Artillery. Sydney, New South Wales: Allen & Unwin. ISBN 1-86373-917-3.
- Morgan, Joseph (2013). "A Burning Legacy: The 'Broken' 8th Division". Sabretache. LIV (3). Garran, Australian Capital Territory: Military Historical Society of Australia: 4–14. ISSN 0048-8933.
