= SS Westralia (1896) =

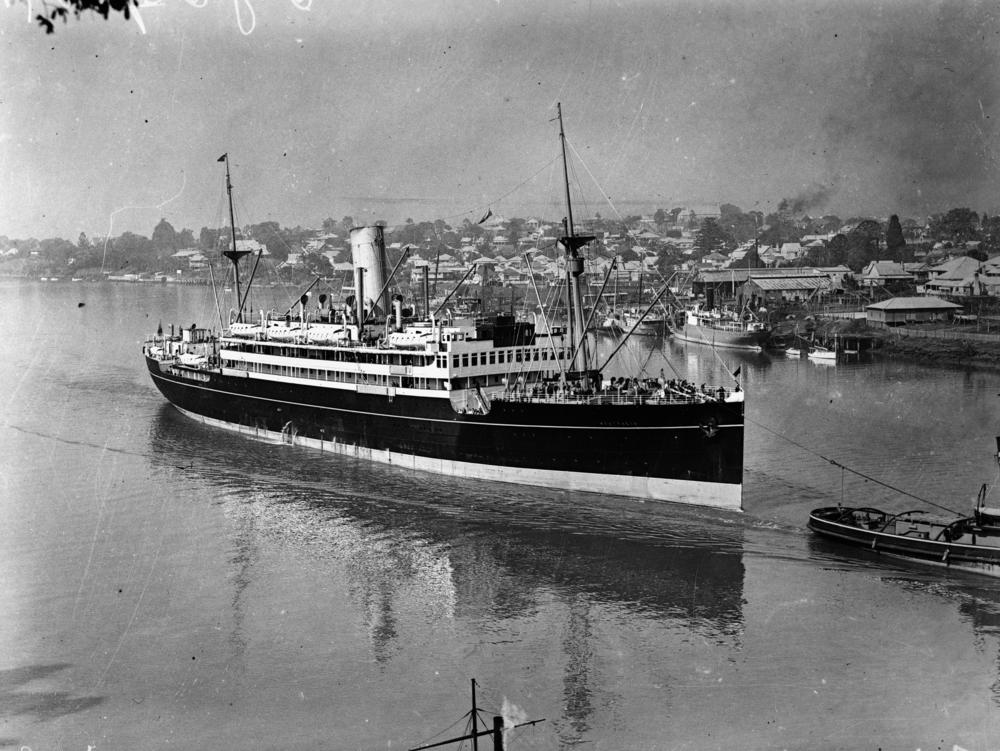

History

Australia
- Name: Westralia
- Owner: Huddart Parker (1897–1927); WR Carpenter (1927–42)
- Builder: Sir J Laing & Sons, Sunderland
- Yard number: 553
- Launched: 23 September 1896
- Completed: January 1897
- Identification: UK official number 106415
- Fate: Sunk in air raids on Rabaul, 20 January 1942

General characteristics
- Tonnage: 2,884 GRT, 1 819 NRT
- Length: 327 ft (100 m)
- Beam: 41 ft (12 m)
- Draught: 20 ft (6.1 m)
- Installed power: 412 NHP
- Propulsion: triple expansion steam engine, single screw
- Speed: 14 knots (26 km/h)

SS Westralia was a 2,884 GRT cargo and passenger ship. She served as a troopship in the First World War and was later converted into a hulk. She was sunk in the air raids on Rabaul on 20 January 1942.

Sir J Laing & Sons, Sunderland, built her in 1897 for the Melbourne-based Huddart Parker line. She worked along the Australian coast and the trans-Tasman route.

In 1917, she was used a troopship, transporting the New Zealand 27th and 28th Main Regiment. She then resumed commercial service with Huddart Parker.

W. R. Carpenter and Company of Sydney bought her in 1927, had her engines removed and towed her to Rabaul for use as coal hulk, arriving in 1929. In the Rabaul air raids on 20 January 1942 she was bombed and sunk in Simpson Harbour.
