= 44th Indian Infantry Brigade =

- Active: 1941–1942
- Country: British India
- Allegiance: British Crown
- Branch: British Indian Army
- Size: Brigade
- Engagements: Battle of Malaya; Battle of Muar; Battle of Singapore

The 44th Indian Infantry Brigade was an Infantry formation of the Indian Army during World War II. The brigade was formed in June 1941, at Poona in India and assigned to the 17th Indian Infantry Division. Under the command of Brigadier George Ballentine, on establishment the brigade drew a mix of regular soldiers, reservists and new recruits to form three infantry battalions; various supporting units were formed between August and September. A signals section was formed in late December. Due to the rapid expansion of the Indian Army, the brigade suffered from a shortage of experienced leaders, with each infantry battalion having on average only three British officers and also lacking Indian viceroy-commissioned officers and non-commissioned officers. The brigade's manpower problems were made worse in late 1941 when an experienced cadre of 250 personnel were transferred from the brigade in order to form another unit. They were replaced by a large number of inexperienced soldiers, many of whom were under 18 years old.

In January 1942, the 44th was transferred to Malaya Command which was giving ground to a strong Japanese force that had invaded Malaya the previous December. During the campaign on the peninsula, the brigade was involved in the Battle of Muar. After the withdrawal of British Commonwealth forces across the Johore Strait to Singapore, the brigade was briefly placed under the command of the Australian 8th Division in February 1942 and assigned to defend an area around the Causeway. The Japanese launched an invasion of the island on 8 February. The brigade took part in the subsequent fighting, but after a week surrendered to the Japanese along with the rest of the garrison on 15 February.

== Formation ==
- 6th Battalion, 1st Punjab Regiment
- 6th Battalion, 14th Punjab Regiment
- 7th Battalion, 8th Punjab Regiment
- 44 Brigade Signals Section
- 44 Brigade Troops Transport Coy. R.I.A.S.C
- 44 Brigade Workshop Section I.A.O.C
- 83 Field Post Office

== See also ==
- List of Indian Army Brigades in World War II
