= 2/20th Battalion (Australia) =

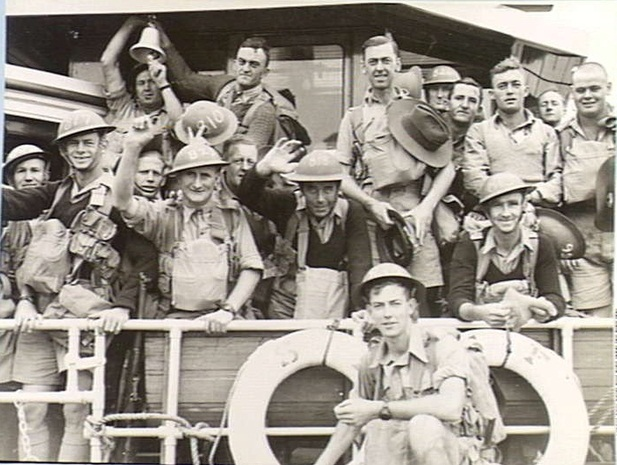
- 2/20th Battalion personnel in Sydney, February 1941
- Active: 1940–1945
- Country: Australia
- Branch: Australian Army
- Type: Infantry
- Size: ~800–900 men (Note: By the start of the Second World War, the authorised strength of an Australian infantry battalion was 910 men all ranks; however, later in the war it fell to 803.)
- Part of: 22nd Brigade, 8th Division
- Engagements: Second World War: Malayan campaign; Battle of Singapore

Insignia
- Unit colour patch

The 2/20th Battalion was an infantry battalion of the Australian Army. Raised in mid-1940 as part of the 8th Division, the battalion was recruited from Second Australian Imperial Force volunteers drawn from the state of New South Wales. In early 1941, the 2/20th Battalion deployed to Malaya, where they formed part of the garrison there until December when the Japanese invaded. The battalion subsequently fought a brief campaign along the east coast of the Malay Peninsula before being withdrawn back to Singapore in early 1942. They were heavily engaged after the Japanese landed on the island, and were eventually captured following the Fall of Singapore. Most members of the battalion became prisoners of war, and a large number died in captivity.

== History ==
Raised for service during Second World War as part of the Second Australian Imperial Force, the 2/20th Battalion (Note: The numerical designation of 2nd AIF units was prefixed by "2/", which was used to set them apart from Militia units.) was formed on 15 July 1940 at Walgrove in Sydney under the command of Lieutenant Colonel William Jeater, a Militia officer who had previously commanded the 2nd Battalion, and was attached to the 22nd Brigade, 8th Division. With an authorised strength of between 800 and 900 men, the battalion was organised into a headquarters and four rifle companies, designated A to D. The battalion's recruits were mainly drawn from Sydney, Newcastle and the New South Wales north coast. The colours chosen for the battalion's unit colour patch (UCP) were the same as those of the 20th Battalion, a unit which had served during the First World War before being raised as a Militia formation in 1921. These colours were white over green, in a diamond shape, although a border of gray in an oval shape was added to the UCP to distinguish the battalion from its Militia counterpart; the oval shape designated the battalion as part of the 8th Division.

After concentrating and commencing training at Walgrove, the battalion moved to Ingleburn in August where rudimentary basic training was completed. In November, after marching through the streets of Sydney, the battalion embarked for Bathurst by train. In late 1940, the British asked the Australian government to contribute a force to garrison the strategically important port of Singapore as tensions in the Pacific with the Japanese rose. Although they had not completed their training, the 22nd Brigade was eventually allocated to this task in early 1941, under the proviso that they would be relieved after a short period and returned to Australia to complete their training prior to being sent to the Middle East.

Embarking for Singapore on 2 February 1941 from Darling Harbour on the ocean liner Queen Mary, the battalion arriving at the naval dock in Singapore. Upon arrival, the 2/20th were moved by train to Bagan Pinang and from there marched to Port Dickson, in south-west Malaya where it conducted further training. In early August, Lieutenant Colonel Charles Assheton took over as commanding officer, and the battalion was redeployed to Mersing, constructing defences there. Following the landings on 8 December 1941, the battalion was subsequently involved in fighting against the Japanese as part of the Malayan campaign. The first strikes of the Japanese attack fell on British and Indian troops in the north of the country, and initially the Australian units, which were based in primarily in the south around Johore, did not see much fighting. On 7 January 1942, C Company was detached to form part of a special unit to delay the Japanese advance at Endau on the north coast, clashing with the Japanese on a number of occasions before withdrawing to the battalion main defensive position at Mersing on 26 January. Meanwhile, the remainder of the battalion at Mersing also clashed with the Japanese on a number of occasions, and was heavily bombed. After being rejoined by C Company, the 2/20th Battalion withdrew to Singapore Island on 31 January, where it took up positions on the northern flank of the brigade sector. In the week following the withdrawal from Malaya, the battalion received an influx of about 80 reinforcements, who were largely untrained having been shipped hastily from Australia with little regard to their preparedness, to make up for earlier losses.

Situated on the north-west coast of the island, the 22nd Brigade was allocated a frontage of 8 miles (13 km) – considerably larger than normal – along a stretch of coast line that was hard to defend due to the tidal flats and islets that punctuated the terrain. When the Japanese assaulted the island on 8 February 1942, the main assault fell on the 22nd Brigade's area, with the 2/20th bearing the brunt of the initial attack. Stretched across a brigade-sized frontage of 7,000 yards (6,400 m), which ran north along the coast from the Serimbun River to the Kranji River, and which included the Namazie Estate, an airfield and the main supply route that ran along the sealed Lim Chu Kang road, the 2/20th Battalion's lines, held by a total of about 750 men, were eventually infiltrated by the assaulting Japanese. After initially inflicting heavy casualties on the Japanese the battalion, threatened with encirclement, was forced to withdraw to a new position along Lim Chu Road. Although still intact, it was apparent that this position would shortly be overwhelmed and the battalion was again ordered to move south, during which it became scattered. The initial Japanese assault cost the battalion heavily. Casualties on the first night amounted to 334 killed and 214 wounded, including the commanding officer, second-in-command and three of the four company commanders. After Assheton had been wounded in the initial Japanese assault, a section was sent out to pull him to safety but before they reached him, he ordered them to leave him due to the volume of Japanese fire and he was subsequently killed.

Separated, the individual elements of the battalion continued to conduct a fighting withdrawal but were subsequently captured on the outskirts of Singapore city on the night of 15 February 1942, along with the bulk of the British Commonwealth forces on the island after the garrison commander, Lieutenant General Arthur Percival, ordered a surrender. The men were initially imprisoned at Changi; however, many were later sent to work on Thai-Burma Railway, while others were sent to prison camps in Borneo, Japan, French Indochina, Java, Sumatra, and Malaya, where they endured considerable hardship with many men dying in captivity. Following the surrender of Japan the survivors were liberated in August 1945. The battalion was disbanded later in 1945; having lost 561 men dead and 122 wounded. Members of the battalion received the following decorations: one Military Medal, one Distinguished Conduct Medal and nine Mentions in Despatches.

== Battle honours ==
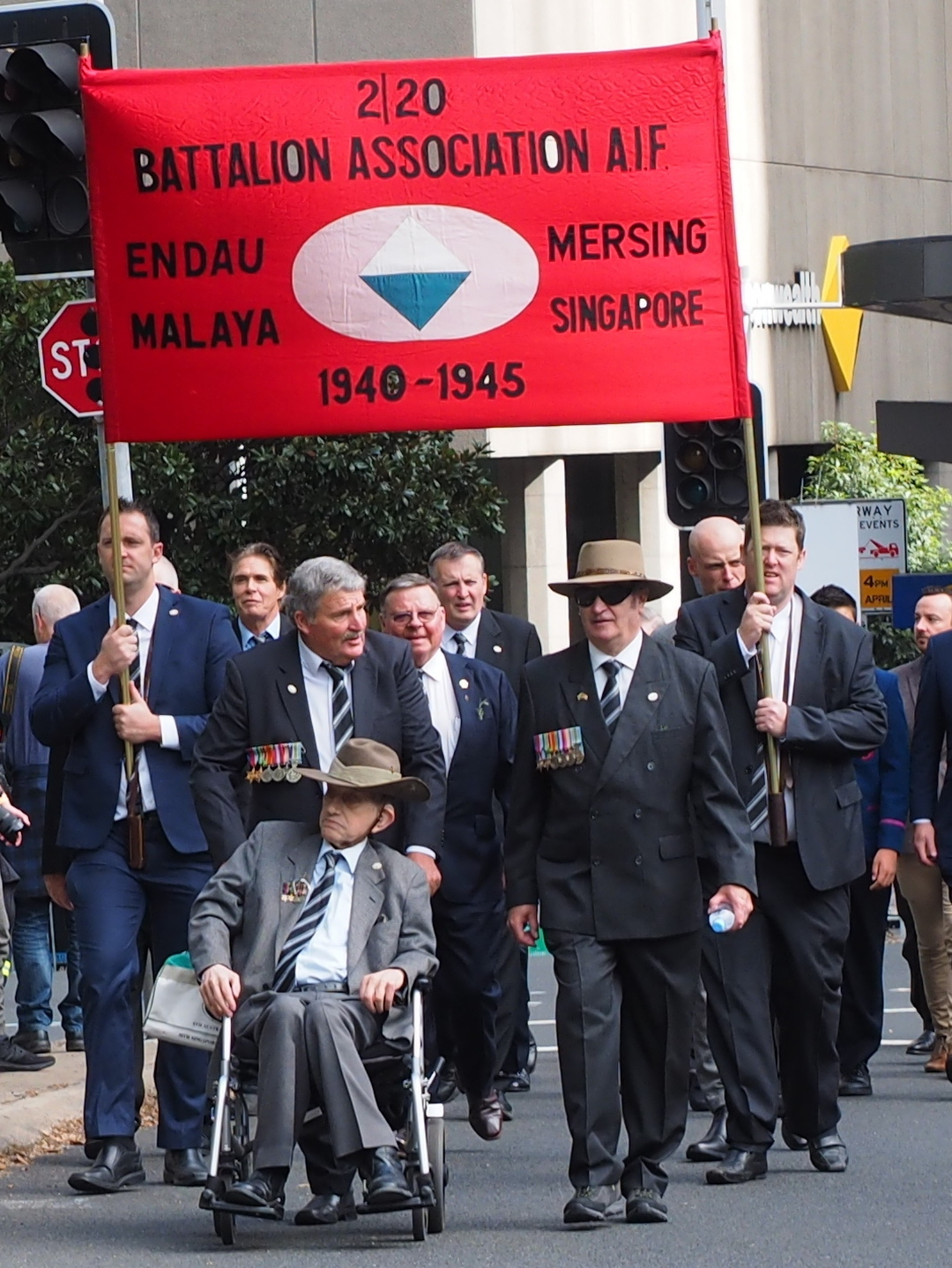
The 2/20 Battalion Association participating in the 2021 Sydney Anzac Day march

The 2/20th Battalion was awarded the following battle honours:

- Malaya 1941–1942, Johore, Singapore Island.

== Commanding officers ==
The following officers commanded the 2/20th Battalion during the war:

- Lieutenant Colonel William Jeater (1940–1941); and
- Lieutenant Colonel Charles Assheton (1941–1942).

== Notes ==
Footnotes

Citations
