= 2/4th Anti-Tank Regiment (Australia) =

Australian Army artillery unit

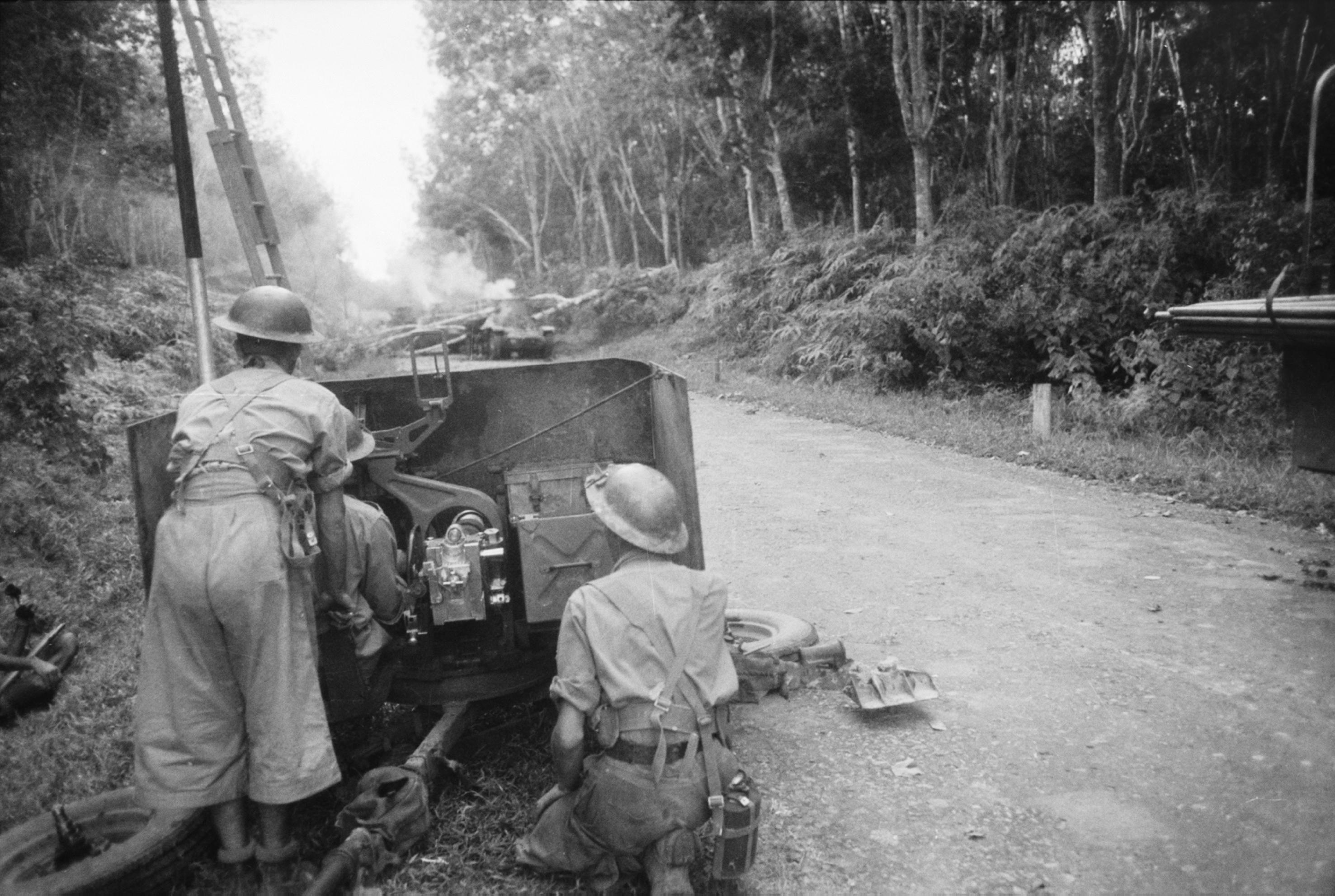
- 2-pdr anti-tank gun from the regiment in action in Malaya, 1942
- Active: 1940–1945
- Country: Australia
- Branch: Australian Army
- Type: Royal Australian Artillery
- Role: Tank attack
- Part of: 8th Division
- Engagements: World War II: Malayan campaign; Battle of Singapore

Insignia
- Unit colour patch

The 2/4th Anti-Tank Regiment was an Australian Army anti-tank artillery regiment that was raised for service during the Second World War as part of the all volunteer Second Australian Imperial Force. It was formed in November 1940, and was assigned to the 8th Division. In early 1942, the regiment took part in the Malayan campaign and the Battle of Singapore before being captured when Singapore fell to the Japanese at which time most of its personnel became prisoners of war. Over 170 members of the regiment died in captivity before the end of the war in August 1945.

== History ==
Formed in November 1940 at Puckapunyal, Victoria, as part of the all volunteer Second Australian Imperial Force that was raised for overseas service during World War II. The regiment was assigned to the 8th Division, replacing the 2/3rd Anti-Tank Regiment, which was transferred to the 9th Division; its first commanding officer was Lieutenant Colonel Cranston McEachern. It initially consisted of four batteries – the 13th, 14th, 15th and 16th – and had an authorised strength of 30 officers and 526 soldiers. In February 1941, the 13th Battery deployed to Singapore to support the 22nd Infantry Brigade, which had been sent to bolster the garrison in Malaya in case of a Japanese invasion; the 14th Battery deployed to Darwin, Northern Territory with the 23rd Infantry Brigade. This battery was later transferred to the 103rd Anti-Tank Regiment, in December 1942. Meanwhile, the rest of the regiment was deployed to Malaya, to rejoin the 13th Battery. The regiment was based around Tampin, while the individual batteries deployed forward: the 13th around Malacca with the 27th Infantry Brigade, the 15th established itself at Mersing, and the 16th deployed with the 22nd Infantry Brigade around Jemaluang, where they were tasked with securing the eastern coast.

During the early war years, there was a shortage of artillery pieces with which to equip the artillery regiments that were formed as part of the Second Australian Imperial Force. The 2/4th was also affected by this, and even after being deployed it was short of its establishment. By December 1941, the regiment possessed only twelve 2-pounder anti-tank guns and twenty-four 75 mm pack howitzers, which was twelve guns short of its entitlement. When the Japanese invasion of Malaya began, the 13th Battery moved to Kluang to continue to support the 22nd Infantry Brigade, but the rest of the regiment was focused on the west coast of the peninsula, supporting the 27th Infantry Brigade as the Japanese advance pushed the Allies back towards Johore. One battery was detached to support the 45th Indian Infantry Brigade during the Battle of Muar, while another battery took part in the Battle of Gemas on 14 January 1942, supporting an ambush on the advancing Japanese by the 2/30th Infantry Battalion. During the battle, the 13th Battery engaged and destroyed four Japanese tanks, and damaged several others, that were advancing down the main road. Despite some local successes, the 22nd and 27th Infantry Brigades withdrew down the peninsula towards the island of Singapore, fighting several delaying actions. By 30 January, the last Allied troops had crossed the Johore Causeway, and it was deliberately blown up to prevent the Japanese from using it.

A short lull followed, as the Japanese prepared to cross the strait. During this time, the two Australian brigades occupied hastily prepared defensive positions on the north-west coast of the island. The 2/4th Anti-Tank Regiment deployed the 13th Battery to support the 27th Infantry Brigade in the Causeway Sector; the 15th supported the 22nd Infantry Brigade in the north-western sector, and the 16th Battery supported the 44th Indian Infantry Brigade in the south-west. Regimental headquarters was located at Yew Tee Village. The regiment was bolstered during this time with its batteries expanding from three troops to four, and receiving more guns; at this time it had thirty 2-pounders, as well as thirteen 75 mm pack howitzers, and four other guns of Italian origin. On the evening of 8/9 February, the Japanese attacked, sending two divisions across the strait to land in the sector held by 22nd Infantry Brigade. Heavy fighting followed and over the course of a week, the regiment's batteries fought numerous local actions, often with just a single gun, as the Allies were pushed back towards Singapore town. During this time, the regiment was heavily engaged. Several guns were placed on trucks for a mobile defence, from which they attempted to engage Japanese armoured vehicles before being knocked out, while others fired in direct support of the infantrymen in the same manner as field artillery. The Australian units were eventually concentrated around Tanglin Barracks where they prepared for a final stand. On 15 February, the garrison commander, Lieutenant General Arthur Percival, ordered the remaining garrison to surrender.

The regiment's casualties during this time amounted to 11 killed, 34 missing in action, and 37 wounded. The surviving members of the regiment subsequently became prisoners of war and spent the next three-and-a-half years in captivity. They were sent to camps around south-east Asia including Thailand, Borneo, Sumatra and Japan before being released at war's end in August 1945. The conditions they experienced were brutal and of the almost 15,000 Australians who were captured during the Malayan campaign and fighting around Singapore, one third died in captivity. More than 170 members of the 2/4th died as prisoners.
