= 2/15th Field Regiment (Australia) =

- Active: 1940–1945
- Country: Australia
- Branch: Army
- Type: Artillery
- Size: ~ 400 to 600 personnel
- Part of: 8th Division
- Engagements: World War II: Malaya; Singapore
- Battle honours: Ubique

Insignia
- Unit colour patch

The 2/15th Field Regiment was an Australian Army field artillery regiment that served during the Second World War. Raised in late 1940 as part of the Second Australian Imperial Force (2nd AIF), the regiment was assigned to the 8th Division. In late 1941, it was sent to Singapore and subsequently fought in the Malayan Campaign before being captured after the Fall of Singapore.

== History ==
Formed in November 1940 in Sydney, the regiment was assigned to the 8th Division and initially consisted of two batteries – the 29th and 30th. Each battery consisted of two troops, designated 'A' to 'D', and then later – when a third battery was raised – 'A' to 'E'. The regiment had an authorised strength of 42 officers and 385 other ranks in early 1941. Each battery eventually consisted of eight guns.

After training with antiquated Ordnance QF 18-pounders, the regiment was re-equipped with 3-inch mortars due to a shortage of field pieces, and deployed to Malaya and Singapore along with the 27th Brigade in August 1941 to reinforce the 22nd Brigade, which had been deployed to Malaya earlier in the year following a request from the British government for Australian troops to help bolster the garrison amidst rising concerns about Japanese intentions in the Pacific. The regiment's first commanding officer was Lieutenant Colonel John O'Neil, but on 11 November 1941 Lieutenant Colonel John Wright, who had previously served in the Australian Flying Corps during the First World War, took over after O'Neill was killed in a car accident.

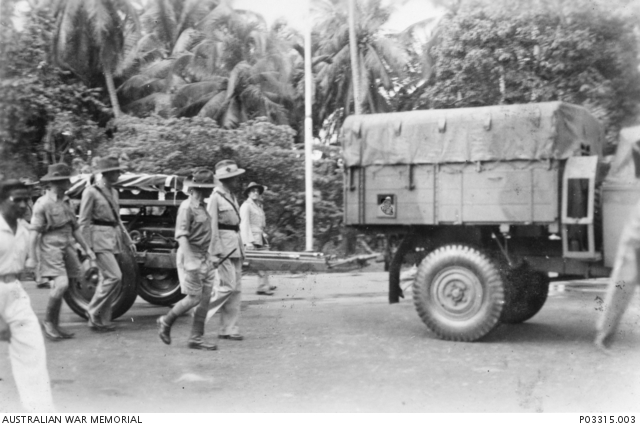
Lieutenant Colonel John O'Neill's funeral procession, November 1941.

Shortly after arriving in Singapore, the regiment began training, taking up a position around Tampines in September. In November, it was re-equipped with Ordnance QF 25-pounders and raised its third battery – designated as the 65th Battery – by which time the regiment's strength grew to around 600 personnel. In early December 1941, the regiment moved north into Malaya and shortly afterwards the Japanese invaded. The regiment was assigned to the 22nd Brigade on the east coast and established its headquarters around Kluang. The initial onslaught of the Japanese thrust was directed against the British and Indian units in the northern part of peninsula, and so it was not until January that the Australians went into action. When they did, the regiment's batteries were split up: the 65th supported the 45th Indian Brigade, while the 29th and 30th were sent to help the Australian 27th Brigade. Throughout January they had a heavy workload, taking part in significant actions at Gemas, Muar and around Ayer Hitam and the Namazie Estate, firing thousands of rounds as they conducted rearguard actions over a distance of 150 miles (240 km), as the Allied forces were pushed south towards Johore and then across the Causeway to Singapore island. During the campaign in Malaya, the regiment suffered numerous casualties as they were frequently called upon to provide support in close contact; the 30th Battery suffered particularly heavy casualties around Muar, with 24 men out of the battery's strength of 98 being wounded.

A brief lull in the fighting followed, during which the regiment continued to fire support missions, attacking Japanese positions in Johore, as the Allied forces prepared for a Japanese attack on Singapore. On 8 February, the Japanese launched a strike across the Strait of Johore, concentrating several divisions on the 22nd Brigade's position in the north-west sector of the island. As the only artillery regiment positioned in support of the 22nd Brigade, the 2/15th was heavily engaged, attacking Japanese barges and assaulting troops, but as the defenders were stretched thinly, their lines were soon penetrated and they were forced to withdraw to prevent encirclement. During the withdrawal, a large number of guns were lost after the 30th Battery's transport became bogged. Over the course of a week, they were pushed back to Singapore city, and by 15 February, the garrison commander, Lieutenant General Arthur Percival gave the order for Allied forces to surrender. A total of 556 personnel from the 2/15th were captured; they would spend three-and-a-half years in Japanese captivity, during which 294 men died. After the war ended in August 1945, the surviving members of the regiment were repatriated to Australia and the regiment was disbanded.
