= Herbert Duncan =

Herbert Duncan may refer to:

- Herbert Cecil Duncan (1895–1942), British Indian Army general
- Herbert Osbaldeston Duncan (1862–1945), English racing bicyclist, journalist and automobile pioneer
