= Parit Sulong Massacre =

1942 massacre in British Malaya by Japan

- Part of the Battle of Muar in World War II
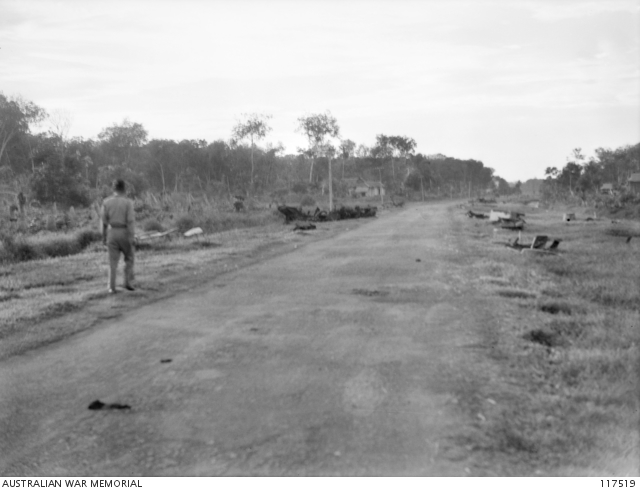
- Wreckage of the 45th Indian Brigade still littered on both sides of the road at Parit Sulong on 26 September 1945. Some of the gear of approximately 133 Australian and Indian troops massacred by the Japanese can be seen on the left.

- Parit Sulong Massacre (Malaysia)
- Location: 1°58′54″N 102°52′42″E; Parit Sulong, British Malaya
- Date: January 22, 1942
- Attack type: Mass murder, war crime
- Deaths: Approximately 150 soldiers of the Australian 8th Division and 45th Indian Infantry Brigade
- Perpetrator: Members of the Imperial Guards Division under the command of Takuma Nishimura

The Parit Sulong Massacre was a Japanese war crime committed by members of the Imperial Japanese Army on 22 January 1942 in the village of Parit Sulong, British Malaya. Soldiers of the Imperial Guards Division summarily executed approximately 150 wounded Australian and Indian prisoners of war who had surrendered.

== Prelude ==
During the Battle of Muar at 7:00 on 20 January 1942, soldiers of both the Australian 8th Division and the 45th Indian Infantry Brigade under the command of Lieutenant Colonel Charles Groves Wright Anderson embarked on a fighting withdrawal from Bukit Bakri. The retreating column consisted of seven officers and 190 men of the 2/29th Australian battalion, in addition to two Indian detachments. The force withdrew in fifty vehicles carrying wounded men, ammunition and a meagre supply of food.

The column was ambushed repeatedly throughout 20 January, however the column eventually came to rest in thick jungle in the evening. On the morning of 21 January, the retreating column continued progress and reached the outskirts of the village of Parit Sulong at 9:30. The village had been in Allied hands up until 19 January, when the local British detachment retreated into the jungle. The village was now firmly in Japanese hands, with units prepared to attack the retreating column which by now was low on ammunition, food and water.

At 11:00, Anderson led an attack on the village which managed to capture the village, however the bridge over the Simpang Kiri river - the only means of retreat - remained in Japanese hands. At 17:00 under request from medical officers, Anderson ordered two ambulances loaded with dying men to approach the bridge and request passage to friendly lines. However, the Japanese officer at the bridge refused this request.

With all attempts to capture the bridge failing, Anderson ordered all able-bodied soldiers to disperse into the jungle and return to Allied lines. Approximately 150 Australian and Indian soldiers were too seriously injured to move and, under the command of Captain Rewi Snelling, were left to surrender to Japanese forces. Some accounts estimate that as many as 300 Allied troops were taken prisoner at Parit Sulong.

== Incident ==
Upon the departure of Anderson and all able-bodied soldiers, Snelling approached the Japanese and offered his surrender along with all the remaining soldiers. The approximately 150 Australian and Indian soldiers, now prisoners of war, were immediately subjected to beatings and the killing of those unable to move. The remaining soldiers were herded into a nearby building where they were stripped naked and kept in overcrowded rooms and denied medical attention and water. During this time, Japanese Imperial Guard soldiers beheaded the Indian soldiers and randomly shot at others.

After some time, the remaining soldiers were forced outside where Imperial Guard soldiers kicked and beat the wounded prisoners of war with their rifle butts. At least some of them were tied up with wire in the middle of the road and machine-gunned. The Japanese then poured petrol over the bodies, with some still alive, and set them alight. According to Russell Braddon "after their incineration...systematically run over, back and forwards, by Japanese driven trucks."Anecdotal accounts by local people also reported POWs being tied together with wire and forced to stand on the bridge, before a Japanese soldier shot one of them, causing the rest to fall into the Simpang Kiri river and drown.

== Aftermath ==
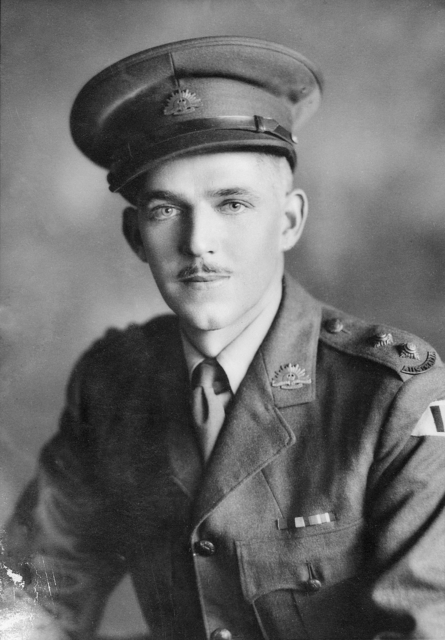
Lieutenant Ben Hackney of the 2/29th Australian Battalion, one of only two men to survive the massacre.

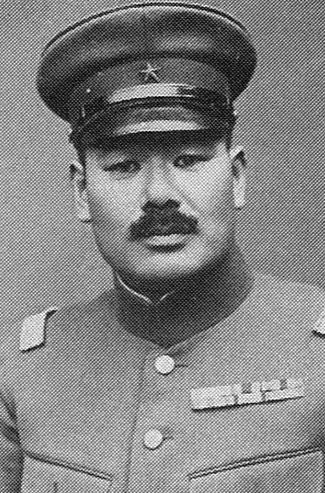
General Takuma Nishimura of the Imperial Japanese Army, who was tried and hanged by Australia in relation to the massacre in 1951.

Lt Ben Hackney of the Australian 2/29th Battalion feigned death and managed to escape. He crawled through the countryside for six weeks with two broken legs, before he was recaptured. Hackney survived internment in Japanese POW camps, and was part of the labour force on the notorious Burma Railway. He and two other survivors gave evidence regarding the massacre to Allied war crimes investigators.

The commander of the Imperial Guards, Lt Gen. Takuma Nishimura, was later in charge of occupation forces in eastern Singapore. He was indirectly involved in the Sook Ching massacre in Singapore. Nishimura retired from the Japanese army in 1942 and was made military Governor of Sumatra. Following the war, he was tried by a British military court in relation to the Sook Ching massacre. Nishimura received a life sentence, of which he served four years. As he returned to Japan, Nishimura was removed from a ship at Hong Kong by Australian military police and charged in relation to the Parit Sulong massacre. Nishimura was taken to Manus Island in the Territory of New Guinea, where he faced an Australian military court. Although Lt. Hackney was shown Nishimura's photo, Hackney could not determine that Nishimura was the culprit. However, Nishimura's family members have often said that Nishimura's photo frequently introduced as a war criminal after Pacific War seems to be one of another person. Hiroshi Kato, a former Japanese journalist, claims that this error seems to have already occurred at the Manus Island camp. It is unclear if this photo was the same one Hackney saw, but it is possible that Hackney saw a photo that was already wrong. After all, other evidence was presented stating that Nishimura had ordered the shootings at Parit Sulong and the destruction of bodies. He was convicted and executed by hanging on 11 June 1951.

In 1996, an Australian journalist named Ian Ward published the book Snaring the Other Tiger, which claimed that the Australian Army prosecutor, Captain James Godwin—a former Royal New Zealand Air Force pilot who had been ill-treated as a POW in Sumatra—had "manipulated" evidence to implicate Nishimura. However, research published by Professor Gregory Hadley and James Oglethorpe in the Journal of Military History in 2007 subsequently showed the evidence Ward had used to indict James Godwin had been fabricated by an American lobbying group that was seeking compensation for former Japanese POWs.

== See also ==
- List of massacres in Malaysia
