= Battle of Gemas =

Battle of the Malayan Campaign in World War II

Coordinates: 2°35′N 102°35′E

- Part of the Battle of Muar — Malayan Campaign — Pacific War — World War II
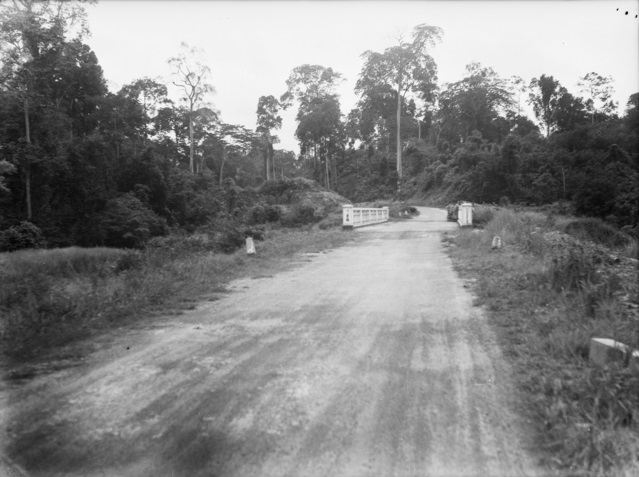
- Gemencheh Bridge in 1945.
Date	14 January 1942
Location	Sungei Gemencheh, Negeri Sembilan, Malaya
Result	Australian victory

Belligerents
Australia	Japan

Commanders and leaders
Frederick Galleghan	Col. Mukaide

Units involved
2/30th Battalion	Japanese 5th Division

Strength
1 battalion	1 column

Casualties and losses
88+ casualties total 8 killed, 80 wounded, unknown captured, unknown missing	1,000 killed, wounded and missing

The Battle of Gemas—part of the wider Battle of Muar—took place during the Japanese invasion of Malaya in the Pacific Campaign of the Second World War. The action occurred on 14 January 1942 at the Gemencheh Bridge near Gemas and saw almost 800 troops of the Japanese 5th Division killed, wounded or missing during a fierce ambush initiated by Australian soldiers from 2/30th Battalion, assigned to the 27th Brigade of the 8th Division. It was the second and last Allied victory of the Malayan campaign. Overwhelmingly heavy losses in the ambush shattered the morale of hundreds of Japanese soldiers.

== Battle ==
The 2/30th Battalion's commanding officer, Lieutenant Colonel Frederick "Black Jack" Galleghan, was ordered to mount an ambush on the main road, 11 kilometres (6.8 mi) west of Gemas in the hope of preventing the Japanese from advancing any further south. The ambush site was located at a point where a wooden bridge crossed the Sungei Gemencheh river, connecting Gemas with the larger neighbouring town of Tampin, and bringing traffic on the road into a long cutting through thick bushland. The 2/30th Battalion subsequently deployed one company in the ambush position 5 kilometres (3.1 mi) forward of the main body of the battalion.

The Japanese had passed through Tampin and needed to cross the bridge to reach Gemas and at 16:00 on 14 January 1942, "B" Company 2/30th Battalion under Captain Desmond Duffy, initiated the ambush. As the Japanese passed through the engagement area in their hundreds—many of them on bicycles—the bridge was blown and the Australians opened fire with machine guns, rifles and grenades. Faulty telephone lines back to the main battalion position prevented Duffy from being able to call in artillery fire on to the follow on Japanese forces, however, and the forward company was subsequently forced to withdraw after a 20-minute engagement as the Japanese began to press their positions.

== Aftermath ==
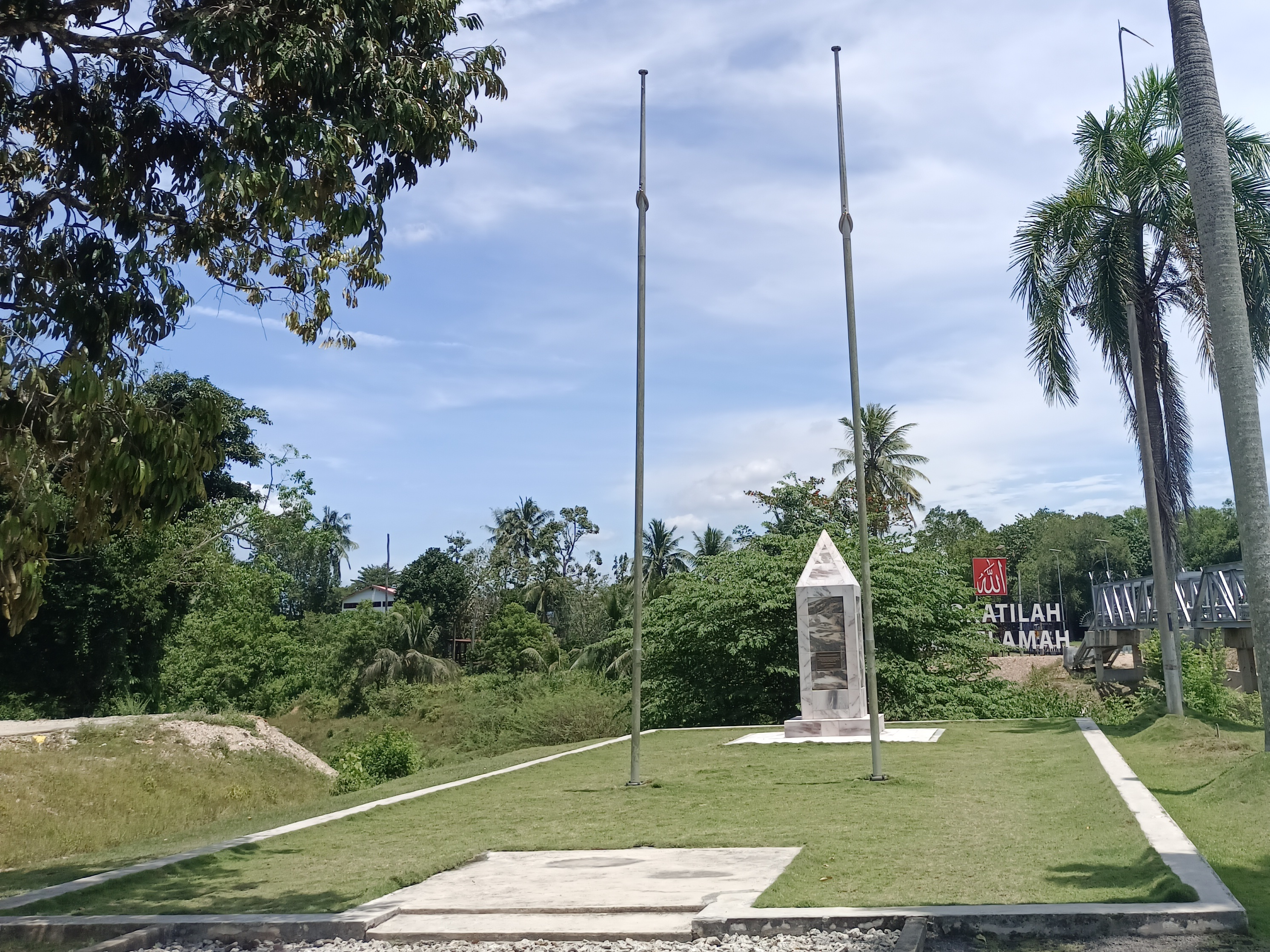
A memorial obelisk dedicated to the fallen men in the Battle of Gemas, near the remnants of the old Gemencheh Bridge

The battle following the ambush, and a further action closer to Gemas during which the Australian anti-tank gunners from the 2/4th Anti-Tank Regiment destroyed six out of eight Japanese tanks, lasted another two days. The fighting ended with the Australians withdrawing through Gemas to the Fort Rose Estate. According to Coulthard-Clark, total Japanese casualties in the wider battle numbered over 800, while the Australians lost more than 88 killed, wounded or missing;

Despite the tactical victory at Gemas, and strong stands later at Bakri, the 22nd Australian Brigade’s ambush north of Jemaluang and the fighting withdrawal from Muar, the Japanese advance down the Malay Peninsula was only temporarily slowed.

== Documentary ==
The Battle of Gemas has remained a footnote in the broader Battle of Muar until a documentary by the same name expanded the importance of this battle.

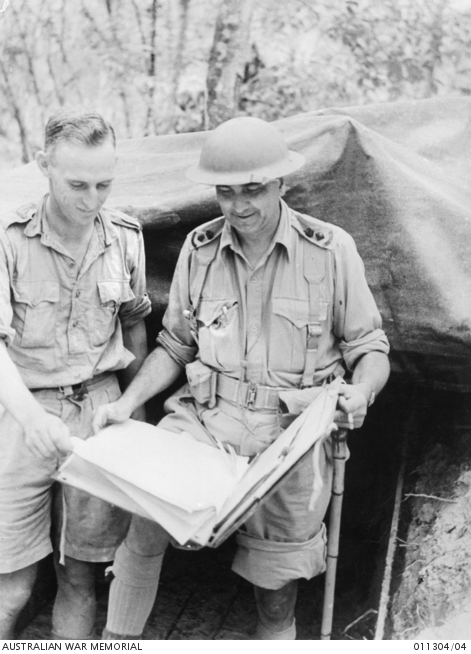
Lieutenant Colonel Frederick Galleghan examining a map with Sergeant Heckendorf outside the command post at Gemas.

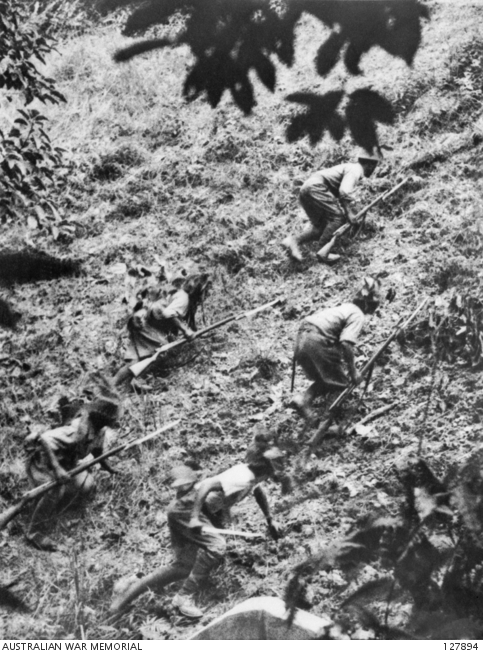
Japanese troops advancing near Gemas.
