= Takuma Nishimura =

Japanese officer, war criminal (1889-1951)

- 西村 琢磨
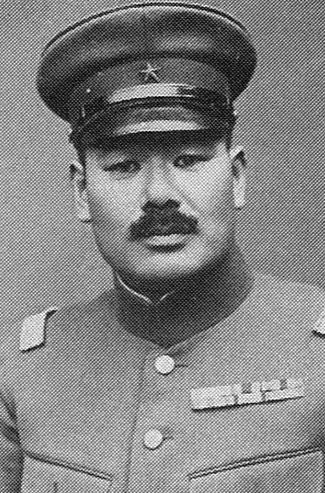
- Born: 12 September 1889; Fukuoka, Japan
- Died: 11 June 1951 (aged 61); Manus Island, Territory of Papua and New Guinea
- Cause of death: Execution by hanging
- Military career
- Allegiance: Empire of Japan
- Branch: Imperial Japanese Army
- Service years: 1910–1942
- Rank: Lieutenant General
- Commands: Indochina Expeditionary Army, Imperial Guard Division
- Conflicts: World War II
- Other work: Japanese military governor of Shan States; Japanese military governor of Sumatra

Takuma Nishimura (西村 琢磨, Nishimura Takuma; 12 September 1889 – 11 June 1951) was a Japanese army general in the Imperial Japanese Army during World War II, active in the invasion and occupation of British Malaya. After the Japanese surrender, he was tried and convicted in British Singapore as a war criminal for his role in the Sook Ching massacres. After four years imprisonment he was handed to Australian authorities for trial on the Parit Sulong Massacre and executed by hanging by the then Australian Territory of Papua and New Guinea.

== Early military career ==
A native of Fukuoka prefecture, Nishimura was a graduate of the 22nd class of the Imperial Japanese Army Academy in 1910, and subsequently attended Army Engineering School. He graduated from the 32nd class of the Army Staff College in 1920. He served most of his career in various staff and administrative posts within the Imperial Japanese Army General Staff.

Nishimura served as presiding judge at the court-martial of army officers responsible for the assassination of Prime Minister Inukai Tsuyoshi in 1932. The defendants all received light sentences. For this he was apparently rewarded later with command of the Imperial Guards Division, a prestigious post.

From 1936 to 1938, Nishimura was commander of the 9th Infantry Regiment, and from 1938 to 1939 commanded the 1st Heavy Field Artillery Brigade. He became Chief of Staff of the Eastern Defense Army from 1939 to 1940. Promoted to Major General in 1940, Nishimura was commander of the Indochina Expeditionary Army in the invasion of French Indochina in 1940. He was promoted to Lieutenant General in 1941.

== World War II ==
During 1941, Nishimura commanded the 21st Independent Mixed Brigade, and then the Imperial Guard Division during the Malayan campaign. During the Battle of Muar, the Imperial Guards killed 155 Australian and Indian prisoners of war in an event known as the Parit Sulong Massacre.

Following the surrender of Allied forces in Singapore, Nishimura was in charge of the eastern half of Singapore Island, during the period in which the Sook Ching massacre took place. Nishimura himself was often at odds with the commander of the 25th Army, General Tomoyuki Yamashita, at times engaging in conduct that seemed deliberately insulting. As a result, his division was denied the Emperor's Victory Citation, and he was recalled to Japan and forced to retire in April 1942.

From June 1943 – February 1944, Nishimura was appointed governor of the Shan States in northern Burma. From February 1944, Nishimura was appointed Japanese military Governor of Sumatra, a post he held until the end of the war.

== Trials for war crimes ==
After the end of the war, Nishimura was tried by a British military tribunal in Singapore for the events related to the Sook Ching massacre. He was found guilty of war crimes, and was sentenced to life imprisonment, of which he served four years in Singapore before being sent back to Tokyo to complete his sentence.

As he was being repatriated to Japan, Nishimura was forcibly removed from a ship at Hong Kong by Australian military police and brought before an Australian military tribunal on Manus Island, where he was investigated with events in connection to the Parit Sulong Massacre. Although Lt. Hackney who had survived the Parit Sulong Massacre was shown Nishimura's photo, Hackney could not determine that Nishimura was the culprit. Nowadays in Japan, Nishimura's photo as a war criminal is often insisted to be probably one of another person. Hiroshi Kato, a former Japanese journalist, claims that this error seems to have already occurred at the Manus Island camp. It is unclear if this photo was the same one Hackney saw, but it is possible that Hackney saw a photo that was already wrong. After all, other evidence was discovered stating that Nishimura had ordered the shootings at Parit Sulong and the destruction of bodies. Nishimura was charged, found guilty and was executed by hanging on 11 June 1951.

In 1996, Australian journalist Ian Ward suggested that the Australian Army prosecutor, Captain James Godwin—a former Royal New Zealand Air Force pilot who had been ill-treated as a POW in Sumatra—had "manipulated" evidence to implicate Nishimura. Ward's impressions were prompted by fabricated evidence from a U.S. lobbyist seeking compensation for Japanese POWs. Ward also claimed that Godwin took no action on the testimony of Lieutenant Fujita Seizaburo, who reportedly stated that he was directly responsible for the Parit Sulong massacre. Fujita fled and was not charged. Fujita's fate is unknown.

Extensive research conducted by Professor Gregory Hadley and James Oglethorpe and published in the Journal of Military History in 2007 subsequently showed that the evidence that purported to indict James Godwin was a later fabrication created to further political causes in the 1990s.

== Bibliography ==
- Fuller, Richard (1992). Shokan: Hirohito's Samurai. London: Arms and Armor. ISBN 1-85409-151-4.
- Ward, Ian (1996). Snaring the Other Tiger. Singapore: Media Masters Publishers.
