= Duncan Maxwell =

Australian brigadier (1892–1969)

- Born: 8 January 1892; Hobart, Tasmania
- Died: 21 December 1969 (aged 77)
- Military career
- Allegiance: Australia
- Branch: Australian Army
- Service years: 1914–1919; 1938–1946
- Rank: Brigadier
- Service number: NX12610
- Commands: 27th Brigade (1941–42); 2/19th Battalion (1940–41); 56th Battalion (1939–40)
- Conflicts: First World War; Gallipoli Campaign; Western Front; Battle of Mouquet Farm; Second World War; Malayan campaign; Battle of Singapore
- Awards: Military Cross

Brigadier Duncan Stuart Maxwell, MC (8 January 1892 – 21 December 1969), also known as Duncan Struan Maxwell, was a medical practitioner and an Australian Army officer who served in the First and the Second World Wars. He was commander of the 27th Brigade during the Japanese invasion of Malaya and the Battle of Singapore in the Second World War.

== Early life ==
Maxwell was born on 8 January 1892 in Hobart, Tasmania, the son of a bank manager. He and his brother both served in the First World War, volunteering for the Australian Light Horse and participating in the Gallipoli campaign in 1915. He was six feet, three inches, tall and nicknamed "Big" Maxwell, with his brother being two inches taller and known as "Shorty" Maxwell.

After Gallipoli, Maxwell transferred to the infantry and fought on the Western Front with the 52nd Battalion. He was awarded the Military Cross for his actions in 1916 at the Battle of Mouquet Farm. The citation for his MC, appearing in The London Gazette in November 1916, reads as follows:

For conspicuous gallantry in action. He held the portion of his trench captured by his company, repulsing three counter-attacks. He displayed great courage and initiative throughout, and set a splendid example to his men.

== Between the wars ==
Returning to civilian life after the war, Maxwell studied medicine at the University of Sydney. He became a doctor and established his own practice in the town of Cootamundra, in New South Wales. He joined the militia in 1939, serving as the second-in-command of the 56th Battalion, although he had difficulty reconciling his duties as a soldier with his professional obligation to save lives.

== Second World War ==
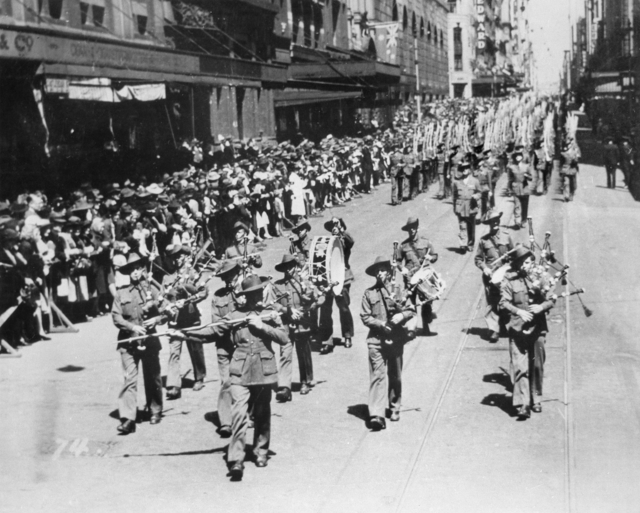
The 2/19th Infantry Battalion marching through the streets of Sydney, September 1940. Maxwell is the first officer behind the marching band.

When the 22nd Brigade was being formed in 1940 as part of the 8th Division, Maxwell was selected by its commander, Brigadier Harold Taylor, to lead the 2/19th Battalion. However, when the original commander of the 27th Brigade became ill before it travelled to British Malaya to reinforce the British presence there, Maxwell was selected to replace him by the commander of 8th Division, Major General Gordon Bennett. This caused tension between Maxwell, who had been promoted to temporary rank of brigadier, and Lieutenant Colonel Frederick Galleghan, not only the senior battalion commander within 27th Brigade but also the 8th Division. Maxwell also did not engender the respect of the other battalion commander in his brigade, Lieutenant Colonel Arthur Boyes.

Following the Japanese invasion of Malaya in December 1941, during which the 27th Brigade undertook a withdrawal down the country into Singapore, Maxwell was a source of frustration to Bennett for repeatedly requesting permission to retreat. In February 1942, with what was left of the Allied forces in Malaya now on Singapore Island, Maxwell's brigade was tasked with defending a 3.5 km stretch of the island's northern coastline. Placing his two battalions near the causeway to the mainland, he located his own headquarters 11 km away, a decision for which he was later criticised due to the ensuing communication difficulties.

In the morning of 9 February, after the Japanese landed and broke through the lines of the adjacent 22nd Brigade, Maxwell sought to withdraw a portion of his forces, but Bennett denied him permission. Later in the day, with the Japanese now landing in his sector, Maxwell ordered them to withdraw from the causeway anyway, having already replaced his two battalion commanders, Galleghan and Boyes, with more compliant officers. This was despite the Japanese advance being hindered more than expected because of the robust defence mounted to this point. After the brigade's withdrawal the next day, it was temporarily attached to the 11th Indian Division by orders of the GOC Malaya, Lieutenant General Arthur Percival.

However, soon Maxwell, on receiving orders from his now divisional commander to attack towards his abandoned sector, claimed that he had received differing orders from Percival. To divisional staff, he stated the orders came from Bennett. He was to move the brigade to recapture Bukit Panjang. Percival and Bennett both later denied any knowledge of these orders. In any event, the move failed and Maxwell's brigade began to break down into companies and platoons and retreated back into Singapore.

Made a prisoner of war after the fall of Singapore, Maxwell was held by the Japanese in a camp on Taiwan. Here he conceded to another prisoner, Brigadier Arthur Blackburn who had been captured on Java, that he deliberately directed his men to retreat from the causeway to let the Japanese land unopposed as he considered his position to be hopeless. He was conscious of the lives of his men and did not wish to see them wasted defending British Malaya.

== Later life ==
At the end of the war, he returned to Australia and placed on the retired list with the honorary rank of brigadier. Soon afterwards he gave evidence in the Military Court of Inquiry raised to investigate allegations that Bennett had abandoned his command after the fall of Singapore. Maxwell died on 21 December 1969.
