= 27th Brigade (Australia) =

Infantry brigade of the Australian Army during World War II

- Active: 1940–1942
- Country: Australia
- Branch: Australian Army
- Type: Infantry
- Size: Brigade
- Engagements: World War II: Malayan Campaign; Battle of Singapore

Commanders
- Notable commanders: Duncan Maxwell

Insignia
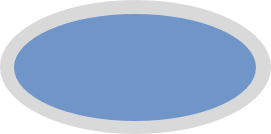
- Headquarters unit colour patch

The 27th Brigade was a brigade-sized infantry unit of the Australian Army. The brigade was the last Second Australian Imperial Force infantry brigade raised for service during World War II. Initially assigned to the 9th Division, the brigade was transferred to the 8th Division shortly after it was raised. Training was undertaken around Bathurst, New South Wales throughout early 1941, before the brigade was sent to British Malaya in August 1941 to reinforce the 22nd Brigade, which had been dispatched earlier in the year. Following the Japanese invasion of Malaya, the brigade went into action in January 1942, taking part in the fighting along the western side of the Malay Peninsula. Its main action during this period came around Muar before the withdrawal to Singapore. In February, the brigade took part in the short lived Battle of Singapore. When the garrison surrendered on 15 February, the majority of the brigade's personnel were taken prisoner. They subsequently spent the remainder of the war in captivity before being released in August 1945.

== History ==
The 27th Brigade was the last infantry brigade raised as part of the all volunteer Second Australian Imperial Force. Originally formed on 13 November 1940 as part of the 9th Australian Division, the 27th Brigade was transferred to the 8th Australian Division when the division's third brigade, the 24th, was transferred to the 9th Division in late 1940. Upon formation, the brigade consisted of three infantry battalions – the 2/26th, 2/29th and 2/30th – which were recruited separately in Queensland, Victoria and New South Wales. These were supported by the 2/15th Field Regiment, which was initially equipped with mortars, although it was later re-equipped with Ordnance QF 25-pounder field guns. Due to the geographic dispersal of its recruits, the brigade initially opened its headquarters at the Sydney Showgrounds, while the constituent units remained at their home locations. In February 1941, the brigade came together around Bathurst, New South Wales for training, under the command of Brigadier Norman Marshall.

After a period of training on the Central Tablelands, the brigade was tasked with reinforcing the 22nd Brigade in British Malaya, where the Australians formed part of a defensive garrison that had been established due to growing concerns about war with Japan. Arriving in Malaya in August 1941, under the command of Brigadier Duncan Maxwell, the brigade moved to Jemaluang, as the 8th Division under Major General Gordon Bennett was tasked with securing the eastern part of Johore. With only two brigades, Bennett pushed the 22nd Brigade forward around Mersing and held the 27th Brigade back as his reserve, with its battalions spread between Segamat, Jasim and Batu Pahat. The brigade later participated in the Malayan Campaign following the Japanese invasion of Malaya in December 1941, although the initial stages of the fighting came in the north, away from the Australians' area of responsibility.

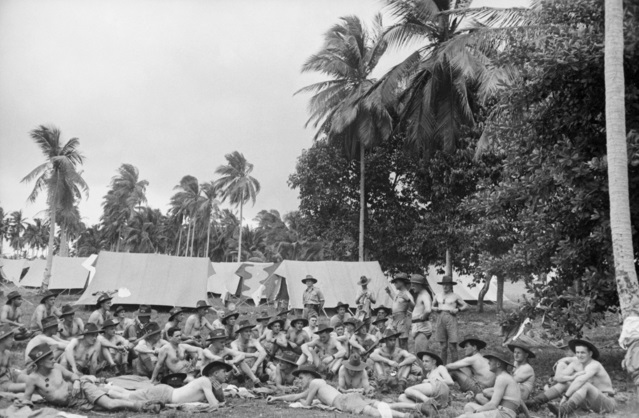
Troops from the 27th Brigade shortly after arrival in Malaya, August 1941

As the Japanese quickly advanced down the Malayan peninsula, the Australian force was reorganised. While the 22nd Brigade assumed control of eastern Johore, the 27th moved to the west where it was joined with several British and Indian units to create an ad hoc formation called "Westforce" under Bennett's command. Throughout January 1942, the brigade fought several delaying actions around the west coast of the Malay Peninsula, including the Battle of Gemas and the wider Battle of Muar, as the Allies were pushed back towards Singapore. The 2/30th Battalion carried out an ambush around Gemas while the 2/26th attempted to block the Japanese advance around the Fort Rose Estate. Meanwhile, on 17 January the 2/29th Battalion was detached to assist the Indian 45th Infantry Brigade. This force became cut off after heavy fighting, and the 2/19th Battalion was detached from the 22nd Brigade to assist. Under the command of Lieutenant Colonel Charles Anderson, the 2/19th fought their way through from Bakri and linked up with the 2/29th. Together, as "Muar Force", they then fought to regain contact with the Indians and then began a fighting withdrawal towards the bridge at Parit Sulong, overwhelming several Japanese roadblocks as they went. Arriving at the bridge, they found that it was firmly held by the Japanese. Several attempts to capture the brigade were made on 21 January, but each time these were defeated. Cut off, and being attacked from all sides and from the air, Muar Force destroyed its vehicles and heavy equipment and left its wounded to await medical attention from the Japanese, and then broke into small groups in an effort to avoid the Japanese positions and march through the jungle to find the Allied lines further to the south. In the aftermath, many of the force's wounded were killed by the Japanese in the Parit Sulong Massacre. The survivors reached Allied lines three days later.

Following this, the Japanese advance continued and eventually the 27th Brigade withdrew to Simpang Renggam through Yong Peng and Ayer Hitam. As efforts were made to delay the Japanese, the brigade temporarily assumed command of several British units during this time, including the 2nd Battalion, Loyal Regiment, and the 2nd Battalion, Gordon Highlanders. The 2/26th and 2/30th Battalions carried out delaying actions before withdrawing to Yong Peng, and then fought to maintain control of the cross road around Ayer Hitam. On 28 January, further fighting occurred around the Namazie rubber plantation where the 2/26th repelled a strong Japanese attack, forcing them to carry out a flanking action that exploited a gap in the line to the west. This nearly rolled through the 2/26th and 2/30th, forcing them to withdraw. By the end of January the Allied forces were withdrawn to Singapore and defensive preparations began to repel a Japanese assault across the Johore Strait. At this time, the 2/29th Battalion, which had taken heavy casualties during the fighting in Malaya, subsequently received a large batch of partially trained reinforcements to make good its losses.

At the conclusion of the Malayan Campaign, the 27th Brigade took part in the defence of Singapore, initially defending the Causeway area. The initial Japanese assault began on the night of 8/9 February, and fell largely on the 22nd Brigade's sector where two Japanese divisions landed during the Battle of Sarimbun Beach. The brigade's troops managed to hold their area, fending off some flanking efforts by the Japanese along the Kranji River, and the 2/29th Battalion was sent south to help bolster the 22nd Brigade. The following night, however, a further Japanese landing fell in the 27th Brigade's area, and heavy fighting took place during the Battle of Kranji. The Japanese suffered heavy casualties from machine guns and mortars from the defenders, as well as burning oil, which had been sluiced across the water. Nevertheless, the attacking troops established a beachhead and the 27th Brigade's headquarters was subsequently cut off from its battalions, as the Allies were pushed back towards the centre of the island. The 2/30th Battalion was pushed back along Thompson's Road, while the 2/26th Battalion moved back to the MacRitchie Reservoir. As the Allied perimeter continued shrink around the town, the 8th Division units were brought together around Tanglin Barracks, where they remained until the garrison surrendered on 15 February. When the garrison surrendered on 15 February, the majority of the brigade's personnel were captured by the Imperial Japanese Army and subsequently spent the remainder of the war as prisoners of war in various camps throughout southeast Asia, being released in August 1945. Conditions were harsh and one in three did not survive.

== Subordinate units ==
The following units were assigned to the 27th Brigade:

- 2/26th Battalion
- 2/29th Battalion
- 2/30th Battalion
- 2/15th Field Regiment

== Commander ==
The brigade was commanded by the following officers during the war:

- Brigadier Norman Marshall (October 1940 – July 1941)
- Brigadier Duncan Maxwell (August 1941 – February 1942)
