= Frederick Galleghan =

Australian general

Sir Frederick Gallagher Galleghan
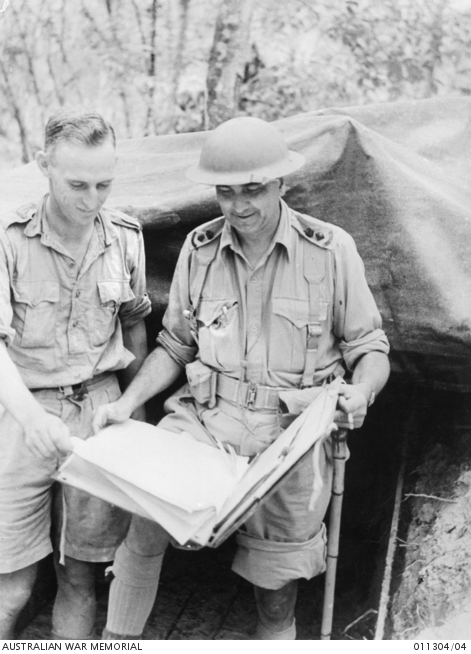
- Galleghan (centre, in helmet) at his battalion's command post, Gemas, January 1942
- Born: 11 January 1897; Jesmond, New South Wales
- Died: 20 April 1971 (aged 74); Mosman, New South Wales
- Military career
- Allegiance: Australia
- Branch: Australian Army
- Service years: 1916–1946; 1948–1949
- Rank: Major General
- Nickname: "Black Jack"
- Service number: NX70416
- Commands: 2/30th Battalion (1940–42); 17th Battalion (1937–40); 2nd/35th Battalion (1934–37); 2nd/41st Battalion (1932–33)
- Conflicts: First World War; Western Front; Second World War; Malayan campaign; Fall of Singapore
- Awards: Knight Bachelor; Distinguished Service Order; Officer of the Order of the British Empire; Imperial Service Order; Efficiency Decoration; Mentioned in Despatches

Major General Sir Frederick Gallagher Galleghan, DSO, OBE, ISO, ED (11 January 1897 – 20 April 1971) was a senior officer in the Australian Army who served in the First and Second World Wars.

Born in a suburb of Newcastle, New South Wales, Galleghan volunteered for service with the Australian Imperial Force in the First World War. He served on the Western Front as a non-commissioned officer. Repatriated to Australia after being wounded, he was later commissioned in the militia. Following the outbreak of the Second World War, he raised the 2/30th Battalion and led it for the majority of the Malayan campaign of late 1941–early 1942. He was awarded the Distinguished Service Order and mentioned in despatches for his services during the fighting in Malaya. Captured along with many of his fellow soldiers following the fall of Singapore, he spent the remainder of the war as a prisoner of war. After the war, he led the Australian Military Mission to Germany and later became involved in charity work. He was knighted in 1969 and died two years later in Sydney at the age of 74.

== Early life ==
Galleghan was born on 11 January 1897 in Jesmond, a suburb of Newcastle, in New South Wales. His parents were Alexander Galleghan, a crane driver, and Martha née James. Of West Indian descent, his dark complexion would in later life lead to his nickname of "Black Jack". He studied at Cooks Hill Superior Public School and, due to his keen interest in the military, joined the Cadets. After completing his education, he began working in the postal service as a telegraph messenger in 1912.

== First World War ==
Galleghan volunteered for the Australian Imperial Force (AIF), raised for overseas service at the start of the First World War, in January 1916 and was assigned to 34th Battalion as a corporal. The battalion, then being formed in New South Wales, was intended for service on the Western Front as part of 9th Brigade, 3rd Division. By late November 1916, the battalion was in France, having spent the previous five months training in England.

Having received a promotion to sergeant, Galleghan served on the Western Front for over two years. He was wounded in June 1917, around the time the 34th Battalion fought in the Battle of Messines, and again in August 1918, during the Hundred Days Offensive. His second wound eventually led to his repatriation to Australia and a subsequent discharge on medical grounds from the AIF in March 1919.

== Interwar period ==
Galleghan return to employment with the postal service, this time on clerical duties, before commencing work for the Department of Trade and Customs in 1926. He remained with this department until 1936, at which time he joined the Sydney office of the Commonwealth Attorney-General's Department.

Galleghan's war injuries were not so serious as to prevent him joining the militia and he was gazetted as a temporary lieutenant in September 1919. He was promoted to captain in 1925, and to major five years later. By 1932, he was a lieutenant colonel and was commander of the 2nd/41st Battalion. Four years later he was awarded the Efficiency Decoration for his service with the militia. He also had periods in command of the 2nd/35th and 17th Battalions. In early March 1940, after the outbreak of the Second World War the previous year, he volunteered for the newly revived AIF.

== Second World War ==
Although the senior lieutenant colonel in the militia, Galleghan was not initially given a command in the AIF. It was only following the intervention of Billy Hughes, at the time the Attorney-General of Australia, that an appointment was found for him in October 1940, when he was named commander of the newly formed 2/30th Battalion. This was part of the 27th Brigade and originally destined for service in the Middle East with the 9th Division. The brigade, and Galleghan's battalion with it, was transferred the following month to the 8th Division, which was intended to be sent to British Malaya.

Galleghan, a strict disciplinarian, had high expectations of his battalion and implemented a rigorous training program. The battalion would become known as 'Galleghan's greyhounds' and was initially based at Tamworth but in the coming months would move around various bases in New South Wales. Training carried on into 1941 and in July the battalion embarked for Singapore on the Dutch transport Johan Van Oldenbarnevelt.

=== Malaya and Singapore ===
During transit to Malaya, the commander of 27th Brigade took ill. Galleghan was disappointed to find that although he was the most senior of the battalion commanders in the brigade, the less experienced Lieutenant Colonel Duncan Maxwell was to be the replacement. Maxwell, previously commander of 2/19th Battalion, was preferred by the divisional commander, Major General Gordon Bennett, by virtue of having already been in Malaya for several months.

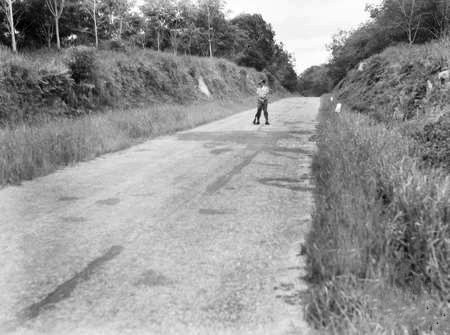
A postwar photograph of the site at Gemas, in Malaya, where Galleghan's 2/30th Infantry Battalion carried out its ambush of advancing Japanese on 14 January 1942

British Indian army units took the initial brunt of the Japanese invasion of Malaya which began on 8 December 1941. By mid-January, the Japanese army had made significant advances down Malaya. Galleghan's battalion was the lead Australian unit and mounted a successful ambush at Gemas on 14 January 1942. Taking up positions around a bridge, one company of the battalion allowed two hundred Japanese cyclists through before initiating their ambush by blowing up the bridge. It was estimated that several hundred casualties were inflicted on the Japanese before the company withdrew to a roadblock established by the remainder of the battalion. The battalion continued to hold up the Japanese advance, which resumed the following day due to a quick repair of the bridge. Two anti-tank guns, which Galleghan mistakenly believed would be of so little use that he sent a third gun to the rear the previous day, destroyed or damaged six Japanese tanks. The battalion withdrew in an orderly fashion late that afternoon over the Gemas River.

The ambush only delayed the Japanese for a short time and Galleghan's 2/30th Battalion fought another delaying action on 25 January at Ayer Hitam. This caused around 250 casualties among the Japanese. Australian losses were four killed and 12 missing or wounded. The Japanese continued to advance and three days later, Galleghan briefly commanded the 27th Brigade in an engagement at a rubber plantation; Maxwell had sited his headquarters some distance to the rear. Despite their efforts, the Australians gradually withdrew to Singapore. Galleghan, still resentful of being passed over for command of 27th Brigade, was critical of Maxwell's handling of the brigade. Bennett, the divisional commander, was similarly dissatisfied with Maxwell's repeated requests to withdraw.

Once on Singapore, the 27th Brigade was tasked with the defence of its northwest coast, with 2/30th Battalion positioned to overlook the causeway between Johore Bahru and the island. On 9 February, early in the Battle of Singapore and with the Japanese having landed in the adjacent sector, Maxwell sent Galleghan to hospital on the ground he was not fit for duty due to ear troubles. Command of his battalion was handed over to his subordinate. In Galleghan's absence from the front, the Japanese were able to make significant advances as 2/30th Battalion was withdrawn to the rear by a pessimistic Maxwell, who considered the defence of Singapore a lost cause and was seeking to minimise casualties among his forces.

=== Prisoner of War ===
After the Battle of Singapore resulted in the British loss of the island, Galleghan was made a prisoner of war (POW) by the Japanese. Imprisoned at Changi with the remainder of the captured Allied soldiers, he was put in charge of POWs from the AIF's Base Depot. In March 1942, the London Gazette published the announcement of his award of the Distinguished Service Order; the recommendation cited his "gallant and distinguished services" during the fighting in Malaya. He was also mentioned in despatches at the same time for his "distinguished services". He became commander of the Australian prisoners at Changi following the transfer in July 1942 of Major General Cecil Callaghan, along with other senior British and Australian officers, to a camp in Formosa. The high standards of discipline and presentation that he expected from his 2/30th Battalion was carried over the POWs under his command, with unarmed combat classes and officer training regimes being implemented. He aimed to ensure that they were able to capitalise on any opportunity to stage an uprising against their captors.

His strict standards resulted in a clash early the following year, when a group of 900 POWs who had been held under harsh conditions in Java arrived at Changi. Galleghan was critical of their appearance, and suggested that the senior officer in charge of the newly arrived POWs, Lieutenant Colonel Weary Dunlop, be replaced. Brigadier Arthur Blackburn, an officer senior to both Galleghan and Dunlop and who was passing through the camp at the time, supported Dunlop in his appointment. Before he and his group of POWs left Changi to go onto a camp on the Thai-Burma railway, Dunlop expressed his disappointment at Galleghan's lack of interest in helping them with provisions.

From 1944, Galleghan was deputy commander of all Allied prisoners in Malaya. Changi was relieved by the Allied forces in August 1945 and two months later, Galleghan returned to Australia. He was never involved with POW associations, always regarding himself a soldier rather than a prisoner and encouraged other former POWs to follow his example. Some under his command found Galleghan's manner to be overbearing and amounting to bullying but for most he engendered considerable respect.

== Later life ==
Galleghan retired from military service in January 1946 with the rank of temporary brigadier; his promotion was with effect from 1942. He returned to his investigative career at the Attorney-General's Department and was soon deputy-director, with responsibility for the Sydney office. The following year he was recognised for his leadership during the imprisonment at Changi with an appointment as an Officer of the Order of the British Empire. The citation noted his "meritorious service & devotion as POW in Malaya". He was made an honorary major general in 1948, and for nearly two years, he was in charge of the Australian Military Mission to Germany. Once his duties in Europe were completed, he became involved in refugee work.

In the postwar period, Bennett's escape to Australia at the end of the fighting at Singapore came under scrutiny, with some senior generals considering his actions to amount to desertion of his troops. However, Galleghan was a supporter of Bennett's conduct, drawing a comparison to that of General Douglas MacArthur's escape from the Philippines in March 1942. Later, during the preparation of the official history of the Australian effort in Singapore, Galleghan suggested the author, Lionel Wigmore, examine Maxwell's decision to remove him from command of 2/30th Battalion during the early stages of the Battle of Singapore.

Galleghan retired from public service in 1959 and was appointed a Companion of the Imperial Service Order. Even in retired life, he continued his involvement with charitable organisations, and was honorary colonel of the Australian Cadet Corps. In the 1969 New Year Honours he was knighted for his work with war veterans. Coincidentally, Weary Dunlop, with whom he had clashed at Changi, was similarly honoured at the same time. He died on 20 April 1971 at his home in Mosman, a suburb of Sydney. He was survived by his second wife, Persia Elspbeth Porter, whom he had married in 1969. Neither of his two marriages resulted in children.
