= 2/29th Battalion (Australia) =

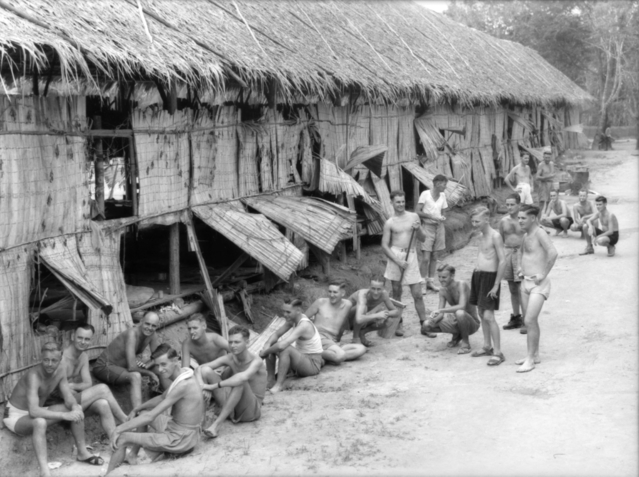
- Ex-prisoners of war from the 2/29th at Changi, September 1945
- Active: 1940–42
- Country: Australia
- Branch: Australian Army
- Type: Infantry
- Size: ~800–900 personnel (Note: By the start of World War II, the authorised strength of an Australian infantry battalion was 910 men all ranks, however, later in the war it fell to 803.)
- Part of: 27th Brigade, 8th Division
- Engagements: World War II: Malayan Campaign

Insignia
- Unit colour patch

The 2/29th Battalion was an infantry battalion of the Australian Army, which served during the Second World War. Formed in October 1940, the battalion served in Malaya as part of the 27th Brigade, which was assigned to the 8th Division. Recruited mainly from volunteers drawn from the state of Victoria, after completing its training around Bonegilla and then Bathurst, the 2/29th Battalion was sent to Malaya in August 1941 along with the rest of the 27th Brigade to bolster the Australian force there and subsequently fought in the Malayan Campaign following the Japanese attack in December 1941. The battalion fought several delaying actions along the west coast, including fighting around Bakri and Muar, and in Johore, before Allied forces withdrew across the Causeway to Singapore. The battalion later took part in the defence of Singapore in February 1942, but was captured after the garrison capitulated on 15 February. They spent the remainder of the war as prisoners of war, with many dying in captivity.

== History ==
Raised on 17 October 1940 amidst an expansion of the Second Australian Imperial Force (2nd AIF) following an escalation of hostilities in Europe, the 2/29th Battalion was established with volunteers drawn mainly from Victoria. Together with the 2/26th and 2/30th Battalions, it formed part of the 27th Brigade, the third and final brigade raised as part of the 8th Division, and the final brigade raised as part of the 2nd AIF. The colours chosen for the battalion's unit colour patch (UCP) were the same as those of the 29th Battalion, a unit which had served during World War I before being raised as a Militia formation in 1921. These colours were black and yellow, in an upright rectangle, although a border of gray in an oval shape was added to the UCP to distinguish the battalion from its Militia counterpart; the oval border denoted that the battalion was an 8th Division unit.

With an authorised strength of around 900 personnel, like other Australian infantry battalions of the time, the battalion was formed around a nucleus of four rifle companies – designated 'A' through to 'D' – each consisting of three platoons. Under the command of Lieutenant Colonel John Robertson, the battalion's initial personnel drafts concentrated at Bonegilla where they conducted rudimentary training, prior to the battalion moving to Bathurst, where it joined the other two battalions of the 27th Brigade, which moved its headquarters from Sydney at this time. Around the same time as the 2/29th moved to Bathurst, the 22nd Brigade was deployed to Malaya to form part of the British garrison forces there, and in mid-1941, as concerns grew about a Japanese attack in the Pacific, it was decided that the 27th Brigade would be despatched to join the 22nd. They subsequently embarked in July, having completed five months of further training at Bathurst during the Australian winter, and arrived in Singapore the following month.

In early September, the battalion moved into Malaya, establishing itself in dispersed locations around Kahang and Kluang, before moving to Segamat later in the month, where further training took place to prepare them for the rigours of jungle warfare. When the Japanese launched their invasion of Malaya in early December 1941, the force of the attack initially fell on the British and Indian forces stationed on the north-east coast and around the Thai–Malayan border, and as a result the 2/29th Battalion did not see action until the middle of January when the Japanese began to advance into Johore. As the situation on the western side of the peninsula worsened, the 2/29th, along with the 2/19th Battalion, were sent to reinforce the 45th Indian Infantry Brigade who were fighting around Muar.

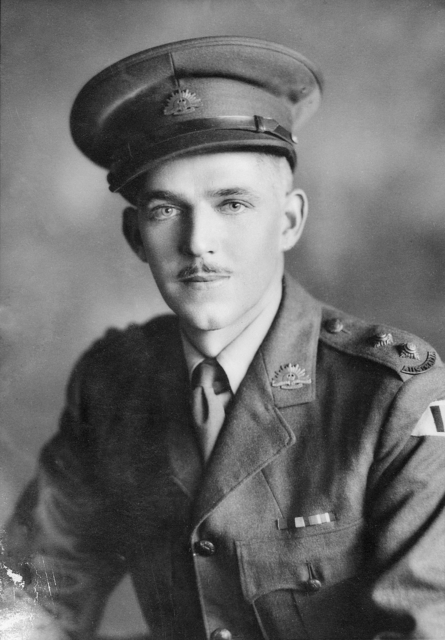
Lieutenant Ben Hackney of the 2/29th Battalion, one of only two men to survive the massacre at Parit Sulong.

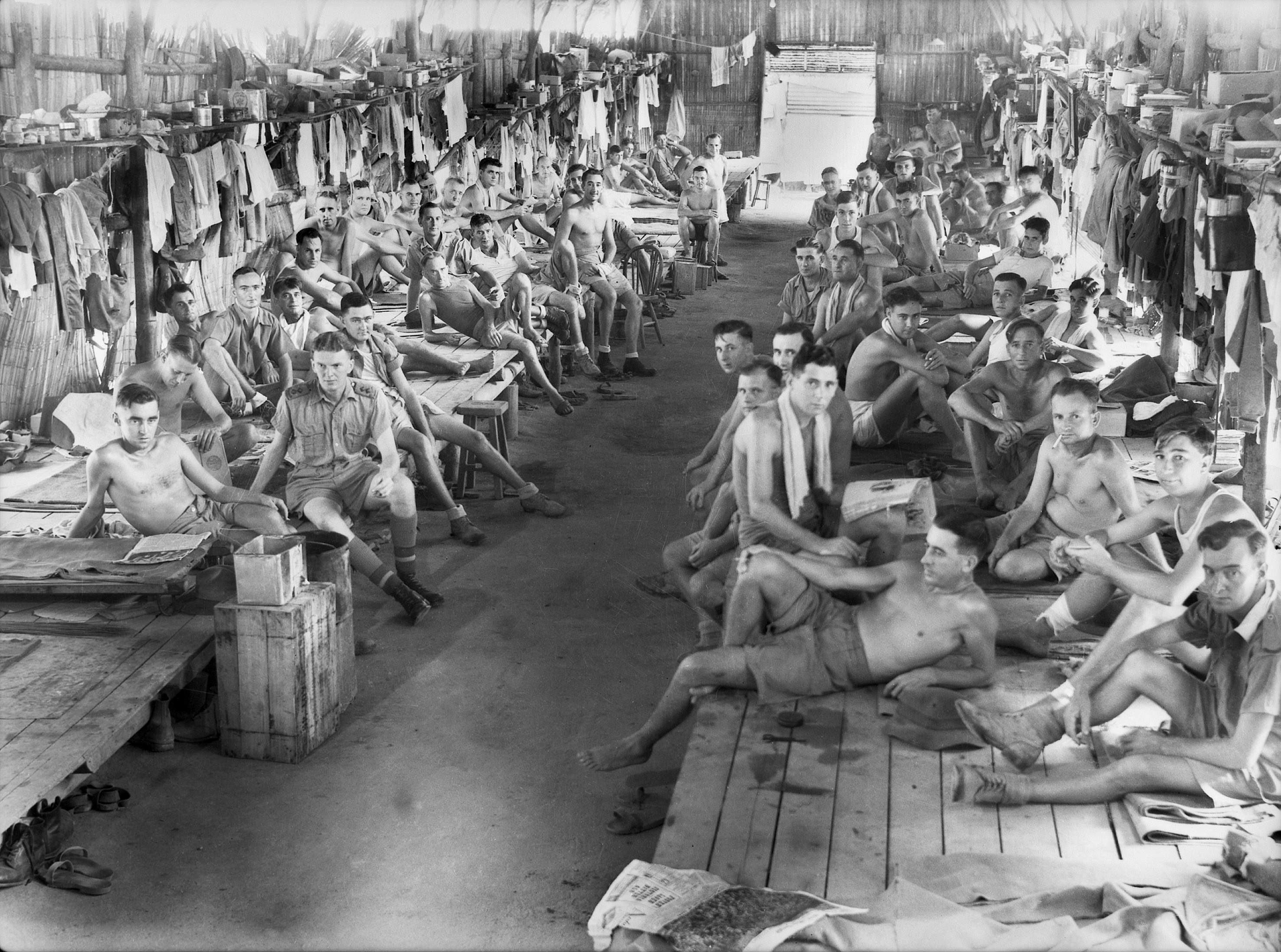
Personnel of C Company, 2/29th Battalion, in their hut at the rear of Changi Gaol, 20 Sept 1945

Arriving at Bakri on 17 January, the Australians established strong defensive positions and the following day, with assistance from an anti-tank regiment, repulsed a heavy Japanese attack that had been supported by armour. As the Japanese felt for the 2/29th Battalion's flanks, their position grew increasing tenuous and they were in danger of being surrounded. The arrival of the 2/19th allowed the 2/29th to withdraw, but further flanking moves by the Japanese cut off the withdrawal route. Fighting their way through several Japanese road blocks and almost constant air attack, they found the river crossing at Parit Sulong in Japanese hands and despite several efforts to wrest control of it, the combined Australian and Indian force had to break track and head into the jungle in an effort to reach Yong Peng, which was still in British hands. In the process, they had to leave their wounded behind with a handful of medical personnel, trusting that they would be cared for by the Japanese. In the end, all but two of the 135 men were executed by their captors. Of the two survivors, one was Lieutenant Ben Hackney of the 2/29th Battalion, who was later captured by the Japanese, but who survived the war as a prisoner.

Heavily depleted by the withdrawal, the 2/29th was withdrawn back to Singapore; the 130 men that successfully completed the trek back to Yong Peng were joined by a draft of 500 fresh replacements, many of whom were very inexperienced having been rushed from in Australia with very little training. (Note: Wigmore recounts that some of these reinforcements had only been enlisted in Australia a fortnight earlier and had not even received basic small arms qualifications.) The battalion's commanding officer, Robertson, had been among those killed in action around Muar, and he was subsequently replaced by Lieutenant Colonel Samuel Pond, previously the brigade major on the staff of the 27th Brigade, who subsequently led the battalion through the remainder of the short campaign. As the battalion was reconstituted with 19 new officers amongst the reinforcements, Pond sought to implement a hasty training program, in the short time available.

Meanwhile, the fighting in Johore continued until 31 January when the Allied forces withdrew across the Causeway, which was subsequently blown up to delay Japanese forces from crossing the Strait of Johore. In anticipation of a Japanese assault across the strait, the Australian forces took up defensive positions in the north-western side of Singapore island, with the 27th Brigade assuming a position west of the Causeway. Despite the battalion's inexperience, it was assigned the role of divisional reserve and given additional tasks related to rear-area security.

When the Japanese assault came on 8 February, the main thrust initially on the 22nd Brigade's positions further west, but as the situation worsened the 2/29th was sent to Tengah airfield to bolster the 22nd Brigade's defence of the north-west sector. Plans were made to launch a counter-attack to re-capture the village of Ama Keng, but these were cancelled when further Japanese advances made this impossible. Throughout 9 February, the battalion fought to hold the airfield against growing Japanese attacks before the defenders were forced to withdraw further back to the Bulim line, positioned on the Choa Chu Kang Road in between the 2/18th Battalion and a composite unit. There, the battalion turned back a Japanese attack on 10 February, but after neighbouring units withdrew amidst the confusion, the 2/29th were also forced back. Withdrawing in contact, elements of the battalion became separated until they were regrouped at Bukit Panjang.

Over the course of the week, further fighting pushed them back to the Kranji–Jurong line where the 2/29th experienced the main force of a further Japanese thrust after the 12th Indian Infantry Brigade was pushed back by two Japanese divisions. Lacking supporting fires following obfuscation from higher headquarters, the battalion was nearly split in half as it withdrew in contact again towards high ground around Bukit Timah. In the process of the withdrawal, individual platoons were forced to fight their way back to Allied lines. At Bukit Timah, the battalion again regrouped minus one company which found itself detached and subsequently fought alongside the Argyll and Sutherland Highlanders. Further fighting saw the Allied forces withdraw towards Singapore City's suburbs, where elements of the 2/29th were used to shore up the line along the Reformatory Road along with part of the 2/20th Battalion and the 2/4th Machine Gun Battalion. The Australian forces subsequently formed a perimeter around Tanglin Barracks where they were making preparations for a counter-attack by the time the garrison surrendered on 15 February following the loss of the city's main water reservoirs.

The battalion's remaining personnel were subsequently ordered to congregate around Changi prison where they were captured. They remained prisoners of war for over three years. During this time, they were moved to camps across south-east Asia, including Japan, Burma, Thailand, and the Dutch East Indies where they were pressed into hard labour and subjected to harsh conditions.

The battalion's Presbyterian chaplain, Rev. Alexander Rowan Macneil, remained interred in Changi Prison until the prisoners were liberated, serving as chaplain to the prisoners of war and establishing Rover Scouting within the Japanese prisoner of war camp system. After the war, he held the first communion in the newly dedicated Warriors' Chapel at Saint Andrew's Church, Forrest, ACT in November 1948, honouring the 10 000 members killed in World Wars I and II. In this service, he used the same chalice and order of service he used at Changi.

A total of 582 personnel from the 2/29th were killed in action or died in captivity, while 143 were wounded in action. Personnel from the battalion received the following decorations: one Officer of the Order of the British Empire, two Military Crosses, one Distinguished Conduct Medal, one Military Medal and 13 Mentions in Despatches.

== Battle honours ==
The 2/29th Battalion received the following battle honours:

- Malaya 1941–1942, Johore, The Muar, Singapore Island.

== Commanding officers ==
The following officers served as commanding officer of the 2/29th:

- Lieutenant Colonel John Charles Robertson (1940–42);
- Lieutenant Colonel Samuel Austin Frank Pond (1942).

== Notes ==
Footnotes

Citations
