= James Gowing Godwin =

Military aviator, prisoner of war, war crimes investigator, colonial administrator

- Born: 12 March 1923; Blenheim, New Zealand
- Died: 2 May 1995 (aged 72); Sydney, Australia
- Military career
- Allegiance: New Zealand; Australia
- Branch: Royal New Zealand Air Force; Australian Army
- Service years: 1942–1946 (New Zealand); 1947–1951 (Australia)
- Rank: Captain
- Conflicts: Second World War
- Other work: Colonial administrator

James Gowing Godwin (12 March 1923 – 2 May 1995) was a pilot of the Royal New Zealand Air Force during the Second World War, who subsequently became a prisoner of war. After the end of the war, as a captain in the Australian Army, he became an investigator with the Second Australian War Crimes Section in Tokyo in July 1947 and developed the case against Lieutenant General Takuma Nishimura, the senior perpetrator of the Parit Sulong Massacre. He subsequently worked for the First Australian War Crimes Section, based in Singapore, then worked for the British colonial service. He died in Sydney at the age of 72.

== Early life ==
Born in Blenheim, Marlborough, New Zealand on 12 March 1923, James Gowing Godwin was the son of a wool buyer, James Gowing Godwin, and his wife Violet Eva née Jackson. He was educated at Blenheim Borough School and then Marlborough College. After completing his schooling, he worked as a clerk for the Social Security Department.

== Second World War ==
Godwin joined the Royal New Zealand Air Force in 1942. His initial flight training was at Woodbourne and Wigram before proceeding onto Canada for more advanced training. Posted to the Fleet Air Arm at the end of 1943, he sailed with HMS Illustrious, which operated Vought F4U Corsair, for the Indian Ocean. In early 1944 he had a period of leave in New Zealand and when en route for Ceylon, to rejoin Illustrious, the ship on which he was travelling was attacked and sunk by a Japanese heavy cruiser. Taken aboard the enemy vessel, he and other survivors were harshly treated, tied up and kept on the deck, exposed to the sun, and only given seawater to drink. Until the end of the war, he was held in a prisoner of war (POW) camp in Japan. On his release he was in poor health, due to being overworked with little food, and had to be hospitalised for six months.

== War crimes investigator ==
In 1947, Godwin was seconded to the Australian Army, with the rank of captain, and was assigned to the Second Australian War Crimes Section (AWCS) as an investigator, based in Tokyo. Australian military courts were tasked with trying persons who had perpetuated war crimes against Australian and British subjects. As a prisoner during the war, Godwin had acquired some understanding of the Japanese language which helped his work. He investigated a number of war crimes, including murders of POWs. The investigation work of the AWCS was stressful, with staff overworked and under resourced.

A major case involved the mass execution and cremation of 155 wounded Australian and Indian soldiers in Malaya, in what is known as the Parit Sulong Massacre. This eventually resulted in the hanging of Lieutenant General Takuma Nishimura, commander of the Imperial Guards Division, in 1951. Godwin collected affidavits from three Japanese soldiers which supported the Australian position that Nishimura ordered the POWs be executed. Nishimura in turn argued that he gave no such order and that his instructions were to turn the POWs over to the headquarters of General Tomoyuki Yamashita, his superior officer in Malaya.

== Later life ==
After his work in Tokyo came to an end, Godwin was based in Singapore working in the First Australian War Crimes Section. This was concluded in 1950 once the focus on prosecution of Japanese war crimes dropped away in favour of restoring relations with Japan. He joined the British colonial service, holding a number of postings in Southeast Asia. His final years were spent in Australia and he worked for a time as an administrator for UNICEF. He died in Sydney on 2 May 1995, suffering from Alzheimer's disease. He was survived by his wife, Sally Tan Oon Neo, whom he had married in Kuala Lumpur in 1962. There were no children of the marriage.

== Legacy ==
James MacKay's 1996 book Betrayal in High Places brought into question the impartiality in which Australian investigations into war crimes were carried out. Ian Ward, an Australian journalist subsequently used MacKay's work to raise concerns that Godwin had falsified evidence in the trial of Nishimura. Through investigations made by Professor Gregory Hadley and James Oglethorpe and published in 2007, it transpired that MacKay, who was an advocate for Japanese seeking reparations for their treatment as prisoners of war of the Allies, fabricated files that he alleged were copies of ones made and suppressed by Godwin. Ward has been criticised for his use of MacKay's falsified evidence. The experiences of Godwin also informed novelist Peter Wells' book Lucky Bastard.
