= Colin Smith (journalist) =

British journalist and author

Colin Smith (born 1944 in Birmingham, England) is a British foreign affairs journalist and author.

Smith has reported on news events in Bangladesh, Southeast Asia, and the Middle East. He is an author of historical fiction and non-fiction, mainly focused on conflicts of the 20th century.

== Life and career ==
For 26 years he worked for The Observer, of which he was later appointed assistant editor, mainly reporting on wars and trouble spots, starting in 1971 with the Bengali uprising in what was then East Pakistan (now Bangladesh). He visited Cambodia and Vietnam during the closing stages of the American presence (1974–75) and remained in Saigon (Ho Chi Minh) after the North Vietnamese Army entered the city. Smith later covered the Middle East, based first in Nicosia, then Cairo and Jerusalem and spending a considerable amount of time (1975–84) in Iran and Lebanon. In 1991 he reported on the First Gulf War, entering Kuwait City with the US Marines, the siege of Sarajevo and the Rwandan genocide. He has twice been named International Reporter of the Year in the British press awards and once runner-up.

== Publications ==
The Last Crusade, a novel set against the backcloth of General Allenby's 1917 campaign against the Ottoman Turks in Palestine . Sharpe Books publish it as an Ebook under the title "Spies of Jerusalem".

Singapore Burning is an account of the fall of Singapore to Japan's General Tomoyuki Yamashita in February 1942 which concentrates on the rearguard actions Australians, UK British and British Indian Army troops fought down the Malayan peninsula in the two months that preceded the surrender.

England's Last War Against France, published in London by Weidenfeld & Nicolson in 2009. It is a history of Allied campaigns against Vichy France between 1940 and 1942 containing considerable personal testimony from participants on both sides.

== Books ==
- Carlos – Portrait of a Terrorist. 1976, revised Penguin edition 2012 .
- Cut Out (novel). 1979. Endeavour Ebook retitled Collateral Damage, 2014
- The Last Crusade (novel). 1990. Endeavour Ebook retitled Spies of Jerusalem, 2013
- Fire in the Night: Wingate of Burma, Ethiopia and Zion (with John Bierman). 1999.
- Alamein – War Without Hate (with John Bierman). 2002.
- Singapore Burning – Heroism and Surrender in World War Two. Viking Penguin, London,(ISBN 0-14-101036-3), 2005.
- England's Last War Against France – Fighting Vichy 1940–42, Weidenfeld, 2009
- Let Us Do Evil (novel) Sharpe Books, 2018
- Warsaw Boy - Andrew Borowiec, Edited, Penguin, 2015
