= Herbert Cecil Duncan =

British Indian Army general (1895–1942)

Brigadier Herbert Cecil Duncan
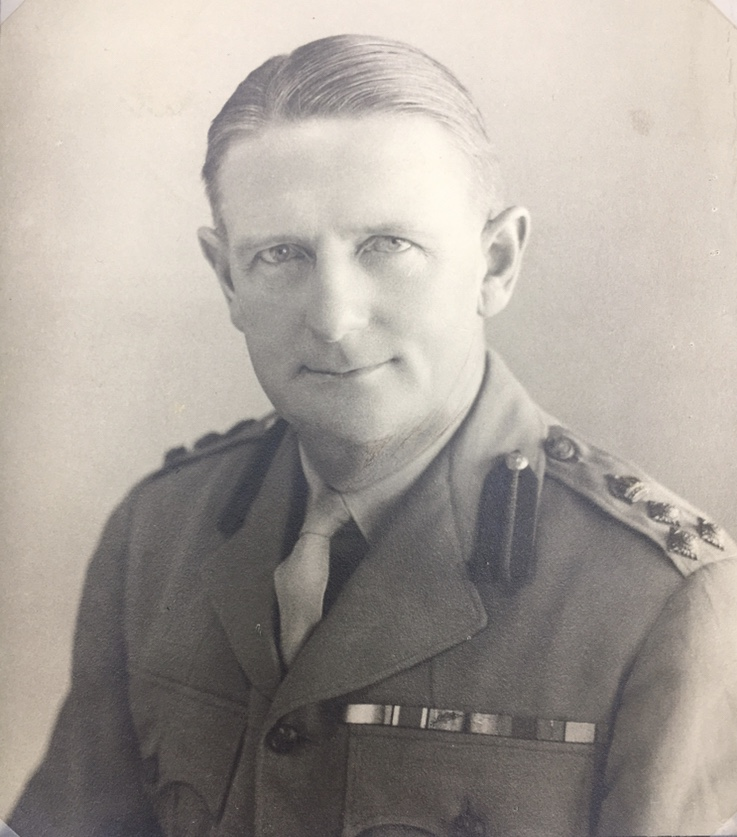
- Born: 19 August 1895; Lanarkshire, Scotland
- Died: 20 January 1942 (aged 46); Singapore
- Burial place: Kranji War Cemetery
- Military career
- Allegiance: United Kingdom
- Branch: British Indian Army
- Service years: 1914–1942
- Rank: Brigadier
- Units: The Seaforth Highlanders; 13th Frontier Force Rifles
- Commands: 45th Indian Infantry Brigade (1941–42)
- Conflicts: First World War; Third Anglo-Afghan War; Third Waziristan Campaign; Second World War; Malayan campaign; Battle of Muar †
- Awards: Mentioned in Despatches (2)

Brigadier Herbert Cecil Duncan (19 August 1895 – 20 January 1942) was a British Indian Army officer who commanded the 45th Indian Infantry Brigade during the Battle of Malaya prior to the Fall of Singapore.

== Military career ==
Commissioned a temporary second lieutenant in the Seaforth Highlanders in 1914, Duncan received a permanent commission in the British Indian Army as a lieutenant in 1918. His service in the First World War earned him a Mention in Despatches. Having the 13th Frontier Force Rifles as his maternal British Indian Army unit, he eventually served from 1931 onwards as a General Staff Officer in various gradations. Duncan would earn a second Mention in Despatches during the Waziristan campaign of 1936–1939. He took command of the 45th Indian Infantry Brigade in June 1941.

During the retreat from the Muar River in Malaya on 19 January 1941, Duncan was concussed during an air attack on his headquarters. The following day, during an attempt to break out of a Japanese encirclement in concert with Australian forces, he was killed while mounting a bayonet charge against a Japanese attack on the brigade's rear. Duncan is buried in the Kranji War Cemetery in Singapore.
