= 45th Indian Infantry Brigade =

- Active: 1941–1942
- Country: British India
- Allegiance: British Crown
- Branch: British Indian Army
- Size: Brigade
- Engagements: Battle of Malaya; Battle of Muar; Battle of Singapore

Commanders
- Notable commanders: Brigadier Herbert Cecil Duncan

The 45th Indian Infantry Brigade was an Infantry formation of the Indian Army during World War II. The brigade was formed in June 1941, at Ahmednagar in India and assigned to the 17th Indian Infantry Division. It was transferred to Malaya Command in January 1942 where it was virtually destroyed in the Battle of Muar. What was left of the brigade was briefly under command of the Australian 8th Division in February 1942, during the Battle of Singapore and surrendered to the Japanese with the rest of the garrison on 15 February.

== Formation ==
- 4th Battalion, 9th Jat Regiment
- 5th Battalion, 18th Royal Garhwal Rifles
- 7th Battalion, 6th Rajputana Rifles
- 2/29th Australian Infantry Battalion
- 2/19th Australian Infantry Battalion

== See also ==
- List of Indian Army Brigades in World War II
