= 2/30th Battalion (Australia) =

Australian Army unit

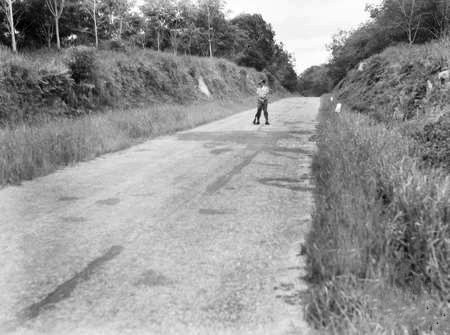
- The cutting near Gemas, Malaya, where the 2/30th Battalion carried out an ambush in January 1942
- Active: 1940–45
- Country: Australia
- Branch: Australian Army
- Type: Infantry
- Size: ~900 men all ranks
- Part of: 27th Brigade, 8th Division
- Engagements: World War II: Malayan campaign; Battle of Singapore

Insignia
- Unit colour patch

The 2/30th Battalion was an infantry battalion of the Australian Army that served during World War II. Raised in late 1940 as part of the all volunteer Second Australian Imperial Force (2nd AIF), the battalion formed part of the 27th Brigade, which was assigned to the 8th Division. In mid-1941, the battalion was deployed to Malaya, as the garrison there was increased amidst rising tensions in the Pacific. In early1942, it fought against the Japanese during the Malayan Campaign and the Battle of Singapore, where it was captured in February 1942. Many of the 2/30th's personnel died in captivity before the war ended in August 1945.

== History ==
=== Formation and training ===
Formed on 22 November 1940 at Tamworth, New South Wales, the battalion was part of the 27th Brigade, which was initially raised as part of the 9th Division, before being transferred to the 8th Division. A unit of the all-volunteer Second Australian Imperial Force (2nd AIF), the battalion drew its personnel from training and Militia battalions manned by volunteers from the state of New South Wales, recruiting mainly from Sydney and several regional areas including Wagga Wagga, Goulburn and Dubbo. Most of the battalion's initial intake of officers were drawn from local Militia infantry battalions, although some were commissioned from the ranks. The colours chosen for the battalion's unit colour patch (UCP) were the same as those of the 30th Battalion, a unit which had served during World War I before being raised as a Militia formation in 1921. These colours were purple and yellow, in an upright rectangle shape, although a border of gray in an oval shape was added to the UCP to distinguish the battalion from its Militia counterpart; the oval border denoted that the battalion was an 8th Division unit.

With an authorised strength of around 900 men, like other Australian infantry battalions of the time, the battalion was formed around a nucleus of four rifle companies – designated 'A' through to 'D' – each consisting of three platoons. There was also a battalion headquarters and a headquarters company that consisted of various specialist platoons and sections including signals, mortars, transport, pioneers, anti-aircraft and administration. The battalion was equipped with a variety of vehicles including Bren carriers, sedans and trucks. Under the command of Lieutenant Colonel Frederick Galleghan, a former Militia officer who had commanded the 17th Battalion, the battalion completed its training around Bathurst, New South Wales, after moving there in early 1941 after commencing training at Tamworth, which was focused upon preparing the battalion for warfare in the Middle East, as it was believed that the 8th Division would ultimately join the other 2nd AIF divisions in the desert.

=== Malaya and Singapore ===
As concerns about Japanese intentions in the Pacific grew, it was dispatched to Malaya in late July 1941 to carry out garrison duties, along with the rest of the 27th Brigade, where it joined the 22nd Brigade, which had been dispatched earlier in the year. Embarking aboard the transport Johann Van Olden-Barneveldt from Woolloomooloo, the battalion sailed as part of a convoy of three transports that transited through Fremantle, Western Australia, before arriving in Singapore in August 1941. Upon arrival, they established camp at Changi, remaining there until September, when the battalion moved north to Johore, establishing themselves around Batu Pahat. Further training was undertaken in Johore, including a large scale exercise around Kluang.

Following Japan's entry into the war in December 1941 and the Malayan Campaign began, the 2/30th Battalion assumed battle stations around Kluang, before moving to Jemaluang. The battalion's involvement in the campaign saw it participate in the battles at the Gemencheh Bridge during the Battle of Gemas, around Ayer Hitam during the defence of Johore and on Singapore. The fighting around the Gemencheh Bridge was their most significant action. Taking place on 14 January 1942, it was the first major action undertaken by Australian forces during the fighting in Malaya. As the Japanese streamed south towards Johore, the battalion was tasked with carrying out an ambush around a cutting on the Gemas–Tampin Road, to inflict heavy casualties before withdrawing. The ambush proved a considerable success, resulting in between 600 and 1,000 casualties for the Japanese and the destruction of several tanks and armoured vehicles. Nevertheless, the British and Commonwealth forces were steadily forced back off the Malay Peninsula and withdrew across the Causeway to Singapore Island.

After the withdrawal to Singapore, the 2/30th Battalion took up a defensive position near the Causeway, as the Australian forces were assigned to the north-west sector of the island. Within this area, the 27th Brigade adopted a position east of the Kranji River, with the 22nd on its left. When the Japanese attack came on early in the morning on 8 February, the main thrust fell on the 22nd Brigade's position and they were steadily forced back. On 10 February, the Japanese launched a second wave against the 27th Brigade's sector, and after a brief, but futile fight the 2/30th was forced to withdraw from the Causeway back towards Bukit Mandai as its flanks became exposed.

The fighting continued for another week, during which the British and Commonwealth forces were pushed back south through Bukit Timah towards the urban area on the island's south-east coast. The Australians, under the command of Major General Gordon Bennett, formed a defensive perimeter about 8 kilometres (5.0 mi) from the centre of the city, in preparation to make a stand, with the 2/30th establishing itself near the French consulate. But, on 15 February 1942, the British and Commonwealth garrison was ordered to surrender by the garrison commander, Lieutenant General Arthur Percival, and as a result, the majority of the battalion was captured and subsequently became prisoners of war, although some were able to escape and return to Australia. They remained in Japanese captivity for the next three-and-a-half years, during which over 300 members of the battalion died from disease or brutality. The battalion's final commanding officer was Lieutenant Colonel George Ramsay, who took over command of the 2/30th on 9 February after Galleghan was hospitalised. While the battalion was not officially disbanded until the end of the war, it was not reformed after the Malayan campaign.

During the course of the war the 2/30th Battalion lost 433 men killed in action or died in captivity, while a further 136 were wounded. The following decorations were bestowed upon 2/30th Battalion personnel: one Distinguished Service Order, four Officers of Order of the British Empire, two Military Crosses, two Distinguished Conduct Medals, one British Empire Medal and 16 Mentions in Despatches. As of 2008, the battalion's numerical designation was perpetuated by the 2/30 Training Group, an Australian Army unit stationed in Butterworth, Malaysia, which conducts training for forces deployed as part of Rifle Company Butterworth. This unit also uses the same Unit colour patch as the 2/30th Battalion.

== Battle honours ==
The 2/30th Battalion received the following battle honours:

- Malaya 1941–1942, Johore, Singapore Island, and Gemas.

== Commanding officers ==
The following officers served as commanding officer of the 2/30th Battalion:

- Lieutenant Colonel Frederick Gallagher 'Black Jack' Galleghan (1940–42);
- Lieutenant Colonel George Ernest Ramsay (1942).
