= Battle of Bukit Timah =

1942 battle during Japan's invasion of Singapore in World War II

- Part of the Battle of Singapore, Pacific War
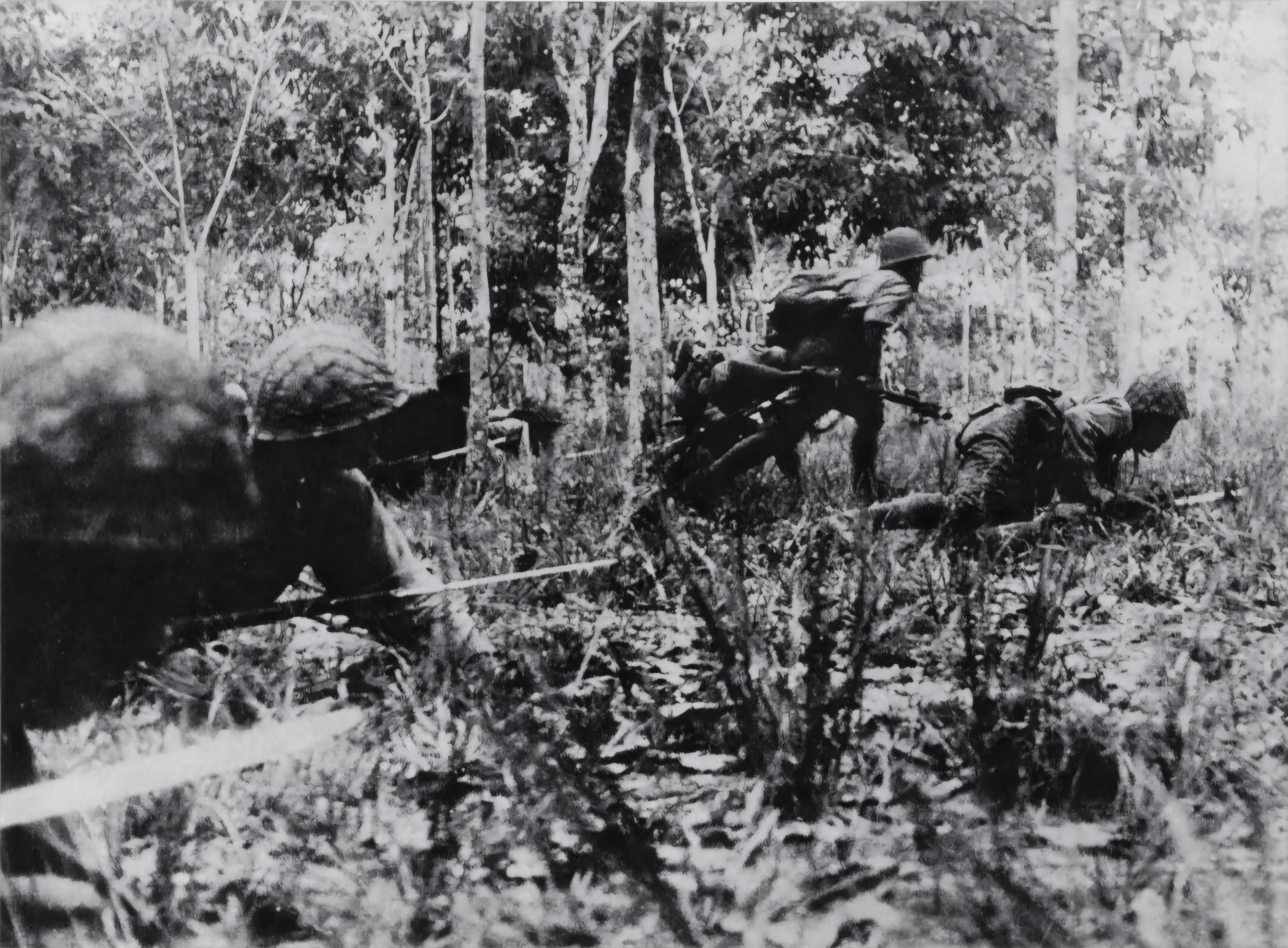
- Japanese troops assaulting Bukit Timah
Date	10–12 February 1942
Location	Bukit Batok, Bukit Panjang and Bukit Timah, Singapore 1.348689873°N 103.777022°E
Result	Japanese victory

Belligerents
British Empire; United Kingdom; India; Straits Settlements; Australia	Japan

Commanders and leaders
(United Kingdom) Ian Stewart (United Kingdom) Angus MacDonald	(Empire of Japan) Masanobu Tsuji

Units involved
(India) 15th Indian Brigade (India) 12th Indian Brigade (Australia) 22nd Brigade (Australia) 27th Brigade (Straits Settlements) Dalforce	(Empire of Japan) 5th Division (Empire of Japan) 18th Division

The Battle of Bukit Timah (10–12 February 1942), was part of the final stage of the Empire of Japan's invasion of Singapore during World War II.

== Battle ==
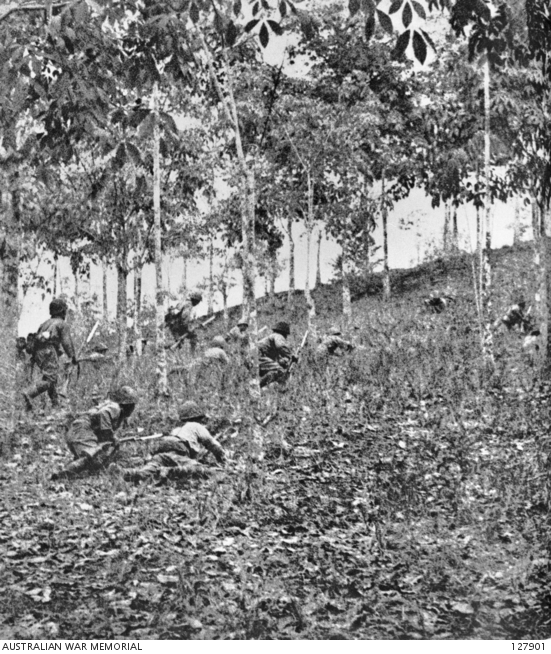
Japanese troops assaulting Bukit Timah hill, under Allied fire.

On 8 February 1942, the Japanese landed a large force on the western side of Singapore Island. Throughout the following days, further troops were landed and heavy fighting followed as they pushed the mainly Australian defenders from the 22nd Brigade back from their positions on the coast. On 10 February further landings were made against the northern positions occupied by the 27th Brigade between the River Kranji and the Causeway, and steadily the British and Commonwealth lines were pushed back south-east towards the centre of the island.

As the Japanese began advancing towards the strategically important Bukit Timah which offered vital supplies including water. British, Indian, and Australian troops from a variety of units fought actions along the Bukit Timah Road in an effort to blunt the advance. As the Japanese 5th Division, with armoured support, advanced down the Choa Chu Kang Road, British troops and Chinese volunteers from the irregular Dalforce engaged in desperate hand-to-hand fighting, but being poorly equipped, they were forced back and by midnight the Japanese had occupied Bukit Timah.

On 11 February, two British brigades attempted a counter-attack, but this was turned back; the following day, the Japanese Imperial Guards, outflanked the British positions from the north, and forced them to withdraw. Dalforce was engaged in further fighting, which resulted in heavy Japanese casualties; in revenge the Japanese killed a large number of Chinese civilians nearby after the fighting.

== Memorial ==
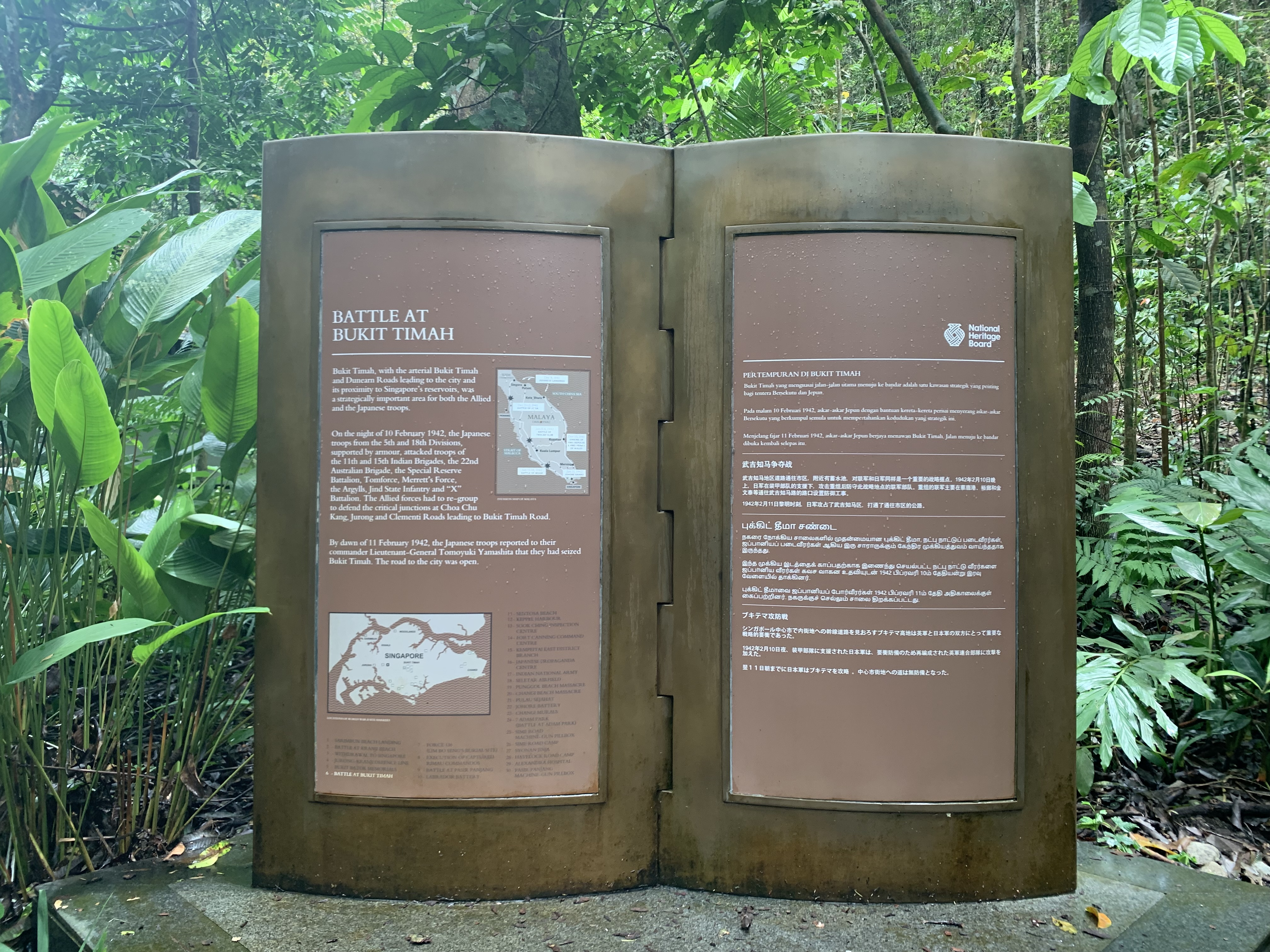
The memorial in the Bukit Timah Nature Reserve

In 1995, a plaque was put at Bukit Timah Nature Reserve to commemorate the Battle of Bukit Timah and World War II.

== See also ==
- History of Singapore
- Battle of Singapore
- Japanese order of battle during the Malayan Campaign
- Malaya Command
