= 2nd Malaya Infantry Brigade =

- Active: 1940–1942
- Disbanded: 1942
- Country: British Malaya
- Allegiance: British Crown
- Branch: Army
- Type: Infantry
- Size: Brigade
- Part of: Malaya Command
- Garrison/HQ: Singapore
- Engagements: Malayan campaign Fall of Singapore

Commanders
- Last commanding officer: Brig F. H. Fraser
- Notable commanders: Frank Keith Simmons

The 2nd Malaya Infantry Brigade was a regular infantry brigade formed in 1940 with its headquarters in Singapore following the wartime expansion and reinforcement of Malaya Command. The Brigade participated in the Malayan Campaign and the Battle of Singapore against the Japanese until the surrender of the garrison in February 1942.

== History ==
=== Background ===
With the outbreak of the Second World War in Europe in 1939, earlier plans for the expansion and reinforcement of British forces in the Far East were accelerated. Initial expansion was slow and patchy due to the reluctance of the War Office in London to transfer forces from Great Britain for fear of a German invasion of Britain.

The Fall of France in June 1940 saw the Japanese adopt a more aggressive stance, including the occupation of parts of the Kowloon peninsula on the Chinese side of the border as well as the seizure of Longzhou in southern Guangxi next to the border of French Indochina brought the threat nearer and resulted in the withdrawal of British forces stationed in Beijing and Tianjin by August 1940 to Singapore to reinforce the Malaya Infantry Brigade garrisoned there.

The reinforcements resulted in the Malaya Infantry Brigade being divided to form the 1st and 2nd Malaya Infantry Brigade on 8 September 1940. The brigade was assigned for the defence of the Changi area of Singapore, the south-east coast of the island and the Pengerang area in Johor.

=== Malayan Campaign ===
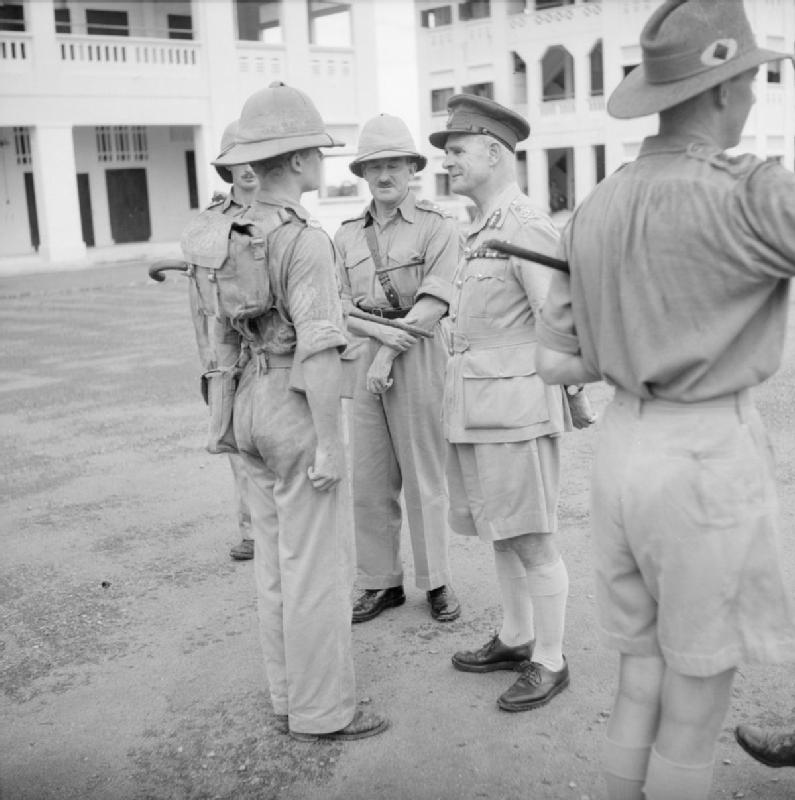
General Sir Archibald Wavell, C-in-C Far East, and Major General F. K. Simmons, GOC Singapore Fortress, inspecting men of the 2nd Battalion, Gordon Highlanders, Singapore, 3 November 1941.

Through most of the Malayan Campaign, the brigade was assigned to passive defence roles in the southern part of Malaya and Singapore. Units of the brigade were, however, involved in the defence of Mersing. The 2nd Battalion of the 17th Dogra Regiment (2/17th Dogras) stationed in Kota Tinggi played a crucial support role to the Australian 22nd Brigade including the successful ambush against Japanese forces in Jemaluang.

The 2nd Battalion of the Gordon Highlanders was also temporarily assigned to reinforce the Australian 27th Brigade defending the main trunk road from Ayer Hitam to Johor Bahru.

=== Battle of Singapore ===
All organised Allied forces in Malaya had retreated to Singapore on 31 January 1942. The Brigade was deployed as part of the defence of the Southern Area of Singapore under the command of Maj Gen Frank Keith Simmons together with the 1st Malaya Infantry Brigade, the Straits Settlements Volunteer Force and the 12th Indian Infantry Brigade.

The deployment of the brigade in the eastern perimeter of Southern Area meant that it saw somewhat limited action during the defence of Singapore but a number of units did get involve in anxious skirmishes near the Paya Lebar airstrip. Some units like the 2/17th Dogras which was stationed in Pulau Tekong were completely bypassed in the fighting until the general surrender of the garrison in Singapore on 15 February 1942.

=== September 1940 ===
The following units were assigned to the brigade at its formation in September 1940.

- 1st Battalion, Manchester Regiment (Machine Gun Battalion)
- 2nd Battalion, Gordon Highlanders

=== December 1940 ===
- 1st Battalion, Manchester Regiment (Machine Gun Battalion)
- 2nd Battalion, Gordon Highlanders
- 2nd Battalion, 15th Punjab Regiment
  - Transferred to Sarawak Force (SARFOR) in May 1941

=== December 1941 ===
The following units were under the command of the Brigade during the outbreak of hostilities in Malaya on 8 December 1941.

- 1st Battalion, Manchester Regiment (Machine Gun Battalion)
- 2nd Battalion, Gordon Highlanders
- 2nd Battalion, 17th Dogra Regiment

=== February 1942 ===
The final order of battle of the Brigade prior to its surrender and dissolution.

- 1st Battalion, Manchester Regiment (Machine Gun Battalion)
- 2nd Battalion, Gordon Highlanders
  - Briefly transferred to the Australian 27th Brigade on 25 January 1942 before reverting to the Brigade on 29 January 1942
- 2nd Battalion, 17th Dogra Regiment
- 7th Coastal Regiment, Royal Artillery
  - Converted to an infantry unit during the last days of the Battle of Singapore
