= 1st Malaya Infantry Brigade =

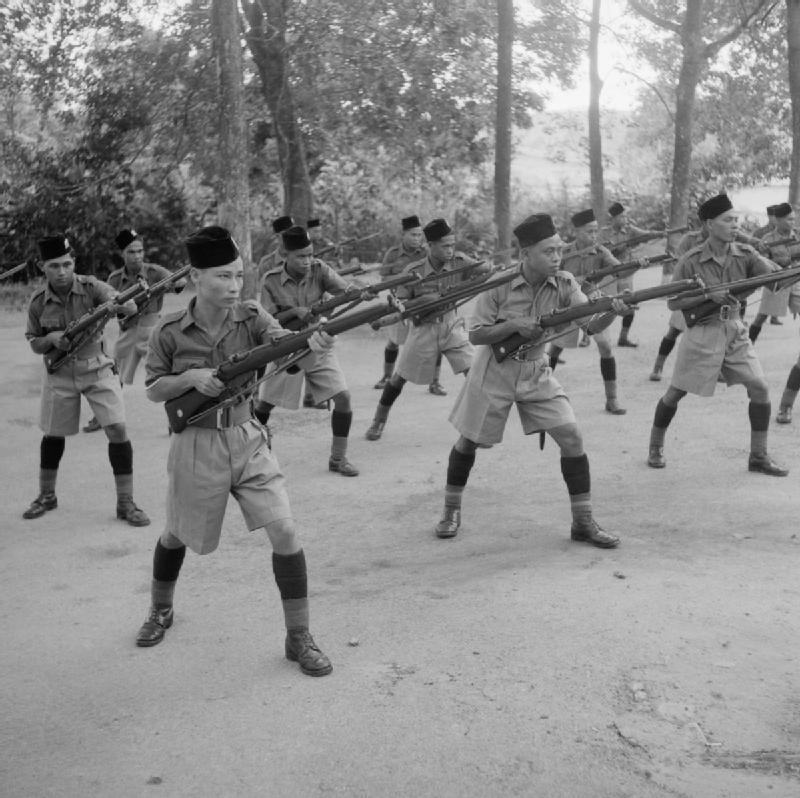
- Men of the Malay Regiment at bayonet practice
- Active: 1939-1942
- Disbanded: 1942
- Country: British Malaya
- Allegiance: British Crown
- Branch: Army
- Type: Infantry
- Size: Brigade
- Part of: Malaya Command
- Garrison/HQ: Singapore
- Engagements: Malayan campaign: Battle of Kota Bahru; Battle of Singapore; Battle of Pasir Panjang

Commanders
- Last commanding officer: Brig G.C.R. Williams
- Notable commanders: Michael Gambier-Parry

The 1st Malaya Infantry Brigade was a regular infantry brigade formed in 1939 with its headquarters in Singapore immediately after the outbreak of hostilities in Europe. The Brigade participated in the Battle of Singapore against the Japanese until the surrender of the garrison in February 1942.

== History ==
Formed on 3 September 1939, the formation was initially known as the Malaya Infantry Brigade as part of the wartime expansion and reinforcement of Malaya Command. It was re-designated the 1st Malaya Infantry Brigade when the 2nd Malaya Infantry Brigade was formed on 8 September 1940.

=== Malayan Campaign ===
The 1st Battalion, Mysore Infantry served in airfield security duties during the Battle of Kota Bahru as part of the 8th Indian Infantry Brigade. With the collapse of the defences in Kota Bahru, the Battalion was withdrawn to Singapore and was joined with the 1st Malaya Infantry Brigade on 18 December 1941.

=== Battle of Singapore ===
All organised Allied forces in Malaya had retreated to Singapore on 31 January 1942. The Brigade was deployed as part of the defence of the Southern Area of Singapore under the command of Maj Gen Frank Keith Simmons together with the 2nd Malaya Infantry Brigade, the Straits Settlements Volunteer Force Brigade and the 12th Indian Infantry Brigade.

The Brigade put up a stubborn defence during the Battle of Pasir Panjang which included the famous last stand at Bukit Chandu led by a platoon of C Company of the Malay Regiment under the command of Second lieutenant Adnan bin Saidi.

With the fall of the Pasir Panjang Ridge, the Brigade fell back to the defensive line established along Mount Echo in Tanglin to Buona Vista. The Brigade was disbanded with the general surrender of the Singapore on 15 February 1942.

== Formations ==
=== September 1939 ===
The following units were put under the command of the Brigade when it was initially formed as the Malaya Infantry Brigade in 1939:

- 2nd Battalion Loyal Regiment (North Lancashire)
- 1st Battalion Manchester Regiment
  - Transferred to the 2nd Malaya Infantry Brigade in September 1940
- 2nd Battalion Gordon Highlanders
  - Transferred to the 2nd Malaya Infantry Brigade in September 1940

=== December 1940 ===
With the formation of the 2nd Malaya Infantry Brigade, units were transferred to the new Brigade:

- 2nd Battalion Loyal Regiment (North Lancashire)
- 1st Battalion Malay Regiment
- 2nd Battalion 17th Dogra Regiment
  - Transferred to the 2nd Malaya Infantry Brigade in August 1941

=== December 1941 ===
The following units were under the command of the Brigade during the outbreak of hostilities in Malaya on 8 December 1941:

- 2nd Battalion Loyal Regiment (North Lancashire)
- 1st Battalion Malay Regiment
- 2nd Battalion Malay Regiment

=== February 1942 ===
The final order of battle of the Brigade prior to its surrender and dissolution:

- 2nd Battalion Loyal Regiment (North Lancashire)
- 1st Battalion Malay Regiment
- 2nd Battalion Malay Regiment
- 1st Battalion Mysore Infantry (Indian State Forces)
  Transferred to the Brigade on 18 December 1941 after the fall of Kota Bahru
- C Company Dalforce
