= Ian MacAlister Stewart =

Brigadier Ian MacAlister Stewart DSO OBE MC* DL
- Born: 17 October 1895; Poona, India
- Died: 14 March 1987 (aged 91)
- Military career
- Allegiance: United Kingdom
- Branch: British Army
- Service years: 1913–1947
- Rank: Brigadier
- Nickname: "Busty"
- Service number: 8329
- Unit: Argyll and Sutherland Highlanders
- Commands: 144th Infantry Brigade; 12th Indian Infantry Brigade; 2nd Battalion, Argyll and Sutherland Highlanders
- Conflicts: First World War; Second World War: Battle of Malaya; Fall of Singapore
- Awards: Distinguished Service Order; Officer of the Order of the British Empire; Military Cross & Bar; Mentioned in Despatches

Brigadier Ian MacAlister Stewart, 13th Laird of Achnacone, DSO, OBE, MC & Bar, DL (17 October 1895 – 14 March 1987) was a Scottish military officer who served in the British Army during both the First and Second World Wars. Known for his eccentric training methods, he commanded the 2nd Battalion of the Argyll and Sutherland Highlanders, which participated in the Malayan campaign and the Battle of Singapore during the Second World War.

== Early life ==
Stewart was born on 17 October 1895, part of the Stewart family of Appin in Argyllshire. His place of birth, in Surore, Poona, India, was where his father, Lieutenant Colonel Alexander Kenneth Stewart, 12th of Achnacone, was a medical officer in the Poona Horse before his parents returned to Scotland. Stewart attended Cheltenham College before going to the Royal Military College, Sandhurst, on a prize cadetship. He passed through Sandhurst in 1913 as the top student of his year, and the youngest.

== First World War ==
Stewart was commissioned into the Argyll and Sutherland Highlanders in February 1914 and on 11 August of that year became the first British soldier to land on French soil and the first to be mentioned in a despatch. He served throughout the First World War and was highly decorated, earning the Military Cross and Bar, and was appointed an Officer of the Order of the British Empire. At the end of the war, Stewart was a temporary captain. He became heir to Achnacone after his older brother, Captain Alexander D.L. Stewart, died in a motorcycle accident in Dublin in 1919.

== Between the wars ==
As with many army officers between the wars, Stewart was placed on half pay, but was restored to full pay as a captain on 3 June 1925. On 8 September 1931, Stewart was promoted to major. Stewart's military career was dominated by his service with the Argylls, a regiment to which he was so wedded that when he was given command of the 2nd Battalion in the 1930s some of his brother officers did not even realise that he was married with a daughter. Stewart had married Ursula Morely-Fletcher in 1937 when he was 42 years old. He even refused a position at the Staff College, Camberley to remain with his battalion, thereby losing the only way to senior command.

== Second World War ==
At the outbreak of the Second World War Stewart was still in command of the 2nd Battalion of the Argylls. Stewart was one of the few British officers to realise the need for training in jungle warfare that would be necessary in order to defeat the Japanese in a war in Malaya. Due to this obsession with jungle training Stewart earned himself a reputation as a crank amongst the more traditional minded officers of Malaya Command. In early 1941, after his battalion had been transferred from India to Malaya, Stewart began rigorously training his men and developing new tactics to fight in all of the extreme and hostile natural terrain of Malaya. When the 2nd Argylls were thrown into the battle in early December 1941, the battalion was one of the few effective units the Japanese would face in their rapid advance down the peninsula, inflicting heavy casualties in every engagement. The Argylls' effectiveness meant that the battalion was continuously used as the buffer and suffered heavy casualties as a result.

Stewart was temporarily given command of the 12th Indian Infantry Brigade after Brigadier Archibald Paris took over the 11th Indian Infantry Division in late December 1941. He was in command of this brigade during the disastrous Battle of Slim River, where the Argylls suffered their worst casualties. When the Battle of Malaya finally ended and the surviving Allied soldiers retreated across the causeway onto Singapore Island, Stewart and his batman, Drummer Hardy, were the last to cross.

=== Plymouth Argylls ===
Stewart was soon returned to his beloved Argylls in Singapore after they had been decimated in the fighting on the mainland. The 250 surviving Argylls were reformed with 210 Royal Marines, survivors from the sinking of HMS Prince of Wales and HMS Repulse, becoming known as the Plymouth Argylls. Stewart had six days to train the new composite battalion before it was put into action on Singapore Island itself. The Plymouth Argylls suffered heavy casualties during the brief Battle of Singapore. Stewart was evacuated unwillingly from Singapore before its surrender due to the need for experienced officers and men who had proven ability to fight the Japanese Army, an ability rare in the British Army at this time. By the time of the surrender on 15 February, the Plymouth Argylls were reduced to 40 officers and men.

What was left of the Plymouth Argyll Battalion, under the command of three captains, were marched into captivity behind their piper. According to some witnesses hundreds of other British Empire soldiers stood to attention as they marched past. Only 52 Argylls managed to escape before Singapore surrendered and make it to Ceylon. Many others were killed or captured when the ships they were escaping on were sunk by Japanese surface and air attack.

=== Later commands ===
On 23 January 1942, Stewart was awarded the Distinguished Service Order for his services in the South West Pacific area. He was initially employed as a General Staff Officer Grade 1 in India, lecturing on his experiences in Malaya. Officers with jungle warfare experience who had actually fought the Japanese and seen their tactics in action were in high demand by the army command in India. Of the officers to have escaped from Singapore, Stewart was one of the most experienced. He became the Chief Instructor at the School of Infantry as a colonel, and later Brigadier General Staff (Training) with 11th Army Group in India. Of Stewart, Field Marshal Archibald Wavell wrote:

If all units in Malaya had been led with the same foresight and imagination that Brigadier Stewart showed in the training of his battalion, the story of the campaign might have been different. It was the realization of this that led me to order Brigadier Stewart's return to India...to impart his knowledge and ideas to units preparing for the return match with the Japanese.

Stewart's report, written after his arrival in India, and his knowledge along with that of the other officers and men who escaped from Singapore, had a direct effect on the training and tactics that would be used by the British and Commonwealth Armies in fighting the Japanese throughout the rest of the war. Stewart returned to the United Kingdom in early 1945, being given command of the 144th Infantry Brigade on 19 March. He spent a period of time as the District Commander for Stirling, the home of the Argyll and Sutherland Highlanders.

== Retirement ==
Stewart retired from the army on 13 April 1947 at the age of 52, a short time after the death of his father. Stewart was a substantive colonel on retirement but was awarded the honorary rank of brigadier. Stewart wrote the book The Thin Red Line, 2nd Argylls in Malaya (Thomas Nelson, 1947), which was reprinted by the Argyll and Sutherland Regimental Museum. He became well known in the Scottish farming community, and became President of the National Farmers Union of Scotland.

Stewart died on 14 March 1987 at the age of 91. His funeral was well attended, with Major Eric Moss as the piper (Moss was Pipe Major of Stewart's 2nd Argylls in Malaya). The address was given by Lord Maclean of Duart.

== Bibliography ==
- Colin Smith (2006). Singapore Burning. England: Penguin Books. ISBN 978-0-14-101036-6.
- Alan Jeffreys, Duncan Anderson (2005). British Army in the Far East 1941–45. Osprey Publishing. ISBN 1-84176-790-5.
- Moreman, T.R. (2005). The jungle, the Japanese and the British Commonwealth armies at war, 1941–45: fighting methods, doctrine and training for jungle warfare (Illustrated ed.). Routledge. pp. 49–50. ISBN 0-7146-4970-8.
