= Gerald Smallwood =

British Army general

Major-General Gerald Smallwood CB DSO MC
- Born: 18 February 1889; Kings Norton, Worcestershire, England
- Died: 3 February 1977 (aged 87)
- Military career
- Allegiance: United Kingdom
- Branch: British Army
- Service years: 1911–1946
- Rank: Major-General
- Service number: 5238
- Units: Royal Warwickshire Regiment; East Yorkshire Regiment
- Commands: Madagascar (1942); 23rd Nigerian Brigade (1940–41); 3rd Nigerian Brigade (1940); Nigerian Brigade (1939–40); Nigeria Regiment (1939); 2nd Battalion, East Yorkshire Regiment (1934–37)
- Conflicts: First World War; Second World War
- Awards: Companion of the Order of the Bath; Distinguished Service Order; Military Cross; Mentioned in Despatches (2); Commander of the Order of the Nile (Egypt)

Major-General Gerald Russell Smallwood, CB, DSO, MC (18 February 1889 – 3 February 1977) was a senior officer in the British Army who served during both the First and Second World Wars.

== Military career ==
Smallwood joined the Royal Warwickshire Regiment on 8 April 1911 as a Special Reserve second lieutenant on probation, confirmed in April 1912. In December 1912, after passing his examination, he was transferred to be a regular second lieutenant in the 2nd Battalion, East Yorkshire Regiment. In September 1914, after the outbreak of the First World War, he was promoted to temporary lieutenant and later that year seconded to the Army Signal Service. He was promoted to captain in 1915. He was twice mentioned in despatches during the war, and he was awarded the Military Cross in the 1916 Birthday Honours.

In 1917 and 1919, Smallwood twice held the rank of acting major while commanding a divisional signals company, and in 1920 he was acting lieutenant colonel while still a substantive captain. In 1922 he left the Signals to attend the Staff College, Camberley, where he encountered many future general officers, including Charles Fullbrook-Leggatt, John Evetts, Thomas Hutton, Keith Simmons and Robert Money. Graduating from Camberley in late 1923, in 1924 he was appointed to the War Office as Staff Captain. In 1927 he was finally promoted to major. In 1934, having been promoted to lieutenant colonel, he was appointed to command his old battalion, the 2nd East Yorkshire Regiment. He commanded the battalion, firstly in England and then in Palestine during the Arab revolt in Palestine.

From 1937 to 1939 Smallwood was posted to the British Military Mission to the Egyptian Army. After this posting the King of Egypt appointed him a Commander of the Order of the Nile.

In 1939, at the outbreak of the Second World War, Brigadier Smallwood commanded the Nigerian Brigade. By 1940, his brigade was named the 3rd Nigerian Brigade. In July 1940, under the terms of a war contingency plan, the 3rd Nigerian Brigade was sent to East Africa. There, the Nigerian brigade was joined by two brigades of the King's African Rifles to form the 1st African Division. Smallwood was the acting commanding officer of this division during its formation.

When Major-General Harry de R. Wetherall took command of the 1st African Division, Smallwood once again reverted to command of his original brigade, now named the 23rd Nigerian Brigade. In 1942, Smallwood was promoted to major-general.

== See also ==
- Royal West African Frontier Force
- East African Campaign (World War II)
- Battle of Madagascar

== Bibliography ==
- Smart, Nick (2005). Biographical Dictionary of British Generals of the Second World War. Barnsley: Pen & Sword. ISBN 978-1-84415-049-6.
