= Frank Simmons =

British Army general

Major-General Frank Simmons CBE MVO MC
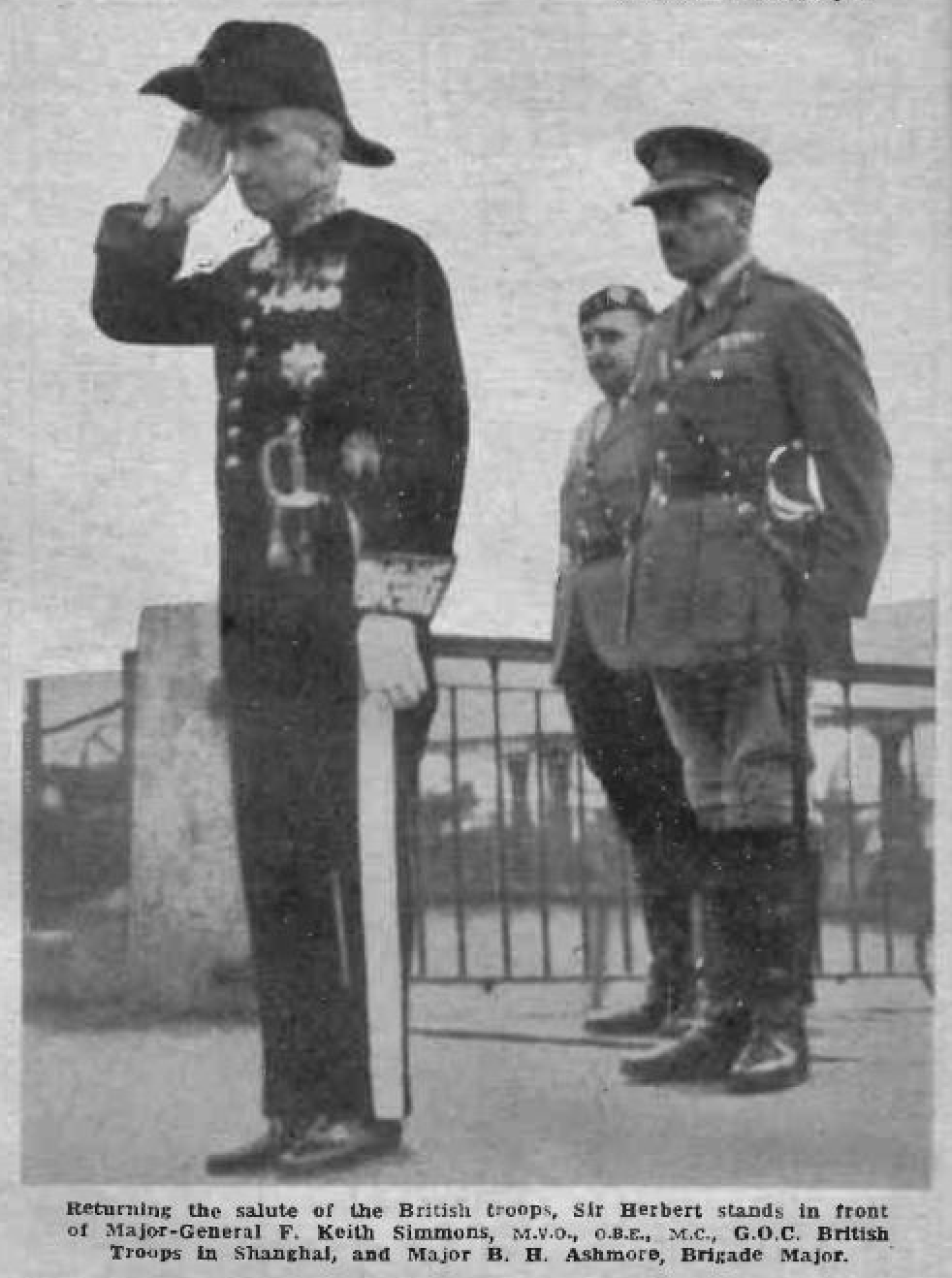
- Simmons (right) in Shanghai in January 1940 on the departure of British Consul General Sir Herbert Phillips (left)
- Born: 21 February 1888
- Died: 22 September 1952 (aged 64); Australia
- Military career
- Allegiance: United Kingdom
- Branch: British Army
- Service years: 1908–1946
- Rank: Major-General
- Service number: 27354
- Units: Highland Light Infantry; Queen's Own Cameron Highlanders
- Commands: Singapore Fortress; 2nd Malaya Infantry Brigade; Southern Brigade, Palestine; 2nd Battalion, Queen's Own Cameron Highlanders
- Conflicts: First World War; Arab revolt in Palestine; Second World War; Malayan campaign Battle of Singapore
- Awards: Commander of the Order of the British Empire; Member of the Royal Victorian Order; Military Cross

Major-General Frank Keith Simmons, CBE, MVO, MC (21 February 1888 – 22 September 1952) was a senior British Army officer during the Second World War. He was commander of the Singapore Fortress when it fell to the invading Imperial Japanese Army in February 1942. He spent the remainder of the war as a prisoner of the Japanese.

== Military service ==
Born on 21 February 1888, Simmons was educated at Cranbrook School, Kent, and was, in 1907, commissioned as a second lieutenant into the Highland Light Infantry. He served in the First World War, on the Western Front, where he awarded the Military Cross and made a Member of the Royal Victorian Order in November 1915.

Remaining in the army during the interwar period, Simmons married in 1922 and attended from 1922 to 1923 the Staff College, Camberley. Among his fellow students there included several future general officers, notably Thomas Hutton, Charles Fullbrook-Leggatt, John Evetts, Gerald Smallwood and Robert Money. After graduation from Camberley, he served as a staff officer at the War Office from 1924 to 1927. Divorcing his wife in 1926, he remarried the following year and transferred to the Queen's Own Cameron Highlanders.

Simmons then served as a Military Attache to Spain from 1928 until 1931, whereupon he then commanded the 2nd Battalion, Cameron Highlanders, from 1932 to 1936. He then commanded the Southern Brigade in British mandated Palestine, as a lieutenant colonel, accompanied by his wife, and was Chief Staff Officer to British Forces in Palestine and Transjordan, from 1937 until 1939, during the Arab revolt in Palestine.

He was the commanding officer of British forces in Shanghai in 1939 and 1940 and later the commander of British defences at the Singapore Fortress in 1941. On 1 January 1941, he was appointed Commander of the Order of the British Empire.

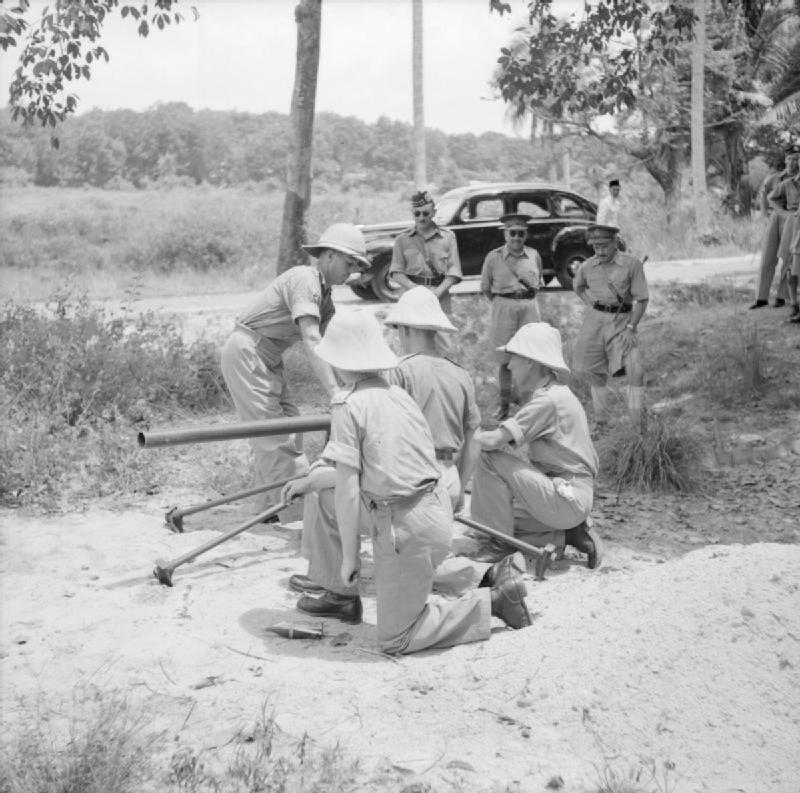
Men of the 2nd Battalion, Gordon Highlanders demonstrate the Northover projector to Major General F. Keith Simmons, GOC Singapore Fortress, and other senior officers, 17 October 1941.

An ardent supporter of the concept that defence construction was detrimental to troop morale, Simmons was eventually placed in command of a committee to ascertain the readiness of Singapore's defences as the Japanese invasion became apparent. He was appointed to "develop" the defence plan by Lieutenant General Arthur Percival. As the situation worsened for the Allies, Simmons was one of a few commanders privy to Percival's last-ditch defence plans and his "no surrender" policy of 11 February 1942.

During the final days of the battle, Simmons was transferred and ordered to command the British forces in the 'Southern Area' of the battlefield. When the decision to surrender became apparent he joined fellow commanders in voicing the opinion that continued resistance was ill-advised. Simmons spent the next three years as a prisoner of war in Japan, prior to his release in 1945 and retirement from the army in 1946.

== Bibliography ==
- Killearn, M. L.; Yapp, M. (1997). Politics and Diplomacy in Egypt. New York: Oxford University Press. ISBN 0-19-726155-8.
- Legg, Frank (1965). The Gordon Bennett Story. London: Angus & Robertson. OCLC 494236458.
- Smart, Nick (2005). Biographical Dictionary of British Generals of the Second World War. Barnsley, South Yorkshire: Pen and Sword Books. ISBN 1844150496.
- Thompson, Peter (2005). The Battle for Singapore: The True Story of the Greatest Catastrophe of World War II. London: Piatkus. ISBN 0-7499-5099-4.
