= 12th Indian Infantry Brigade =

- Active: pre-1939 – 15 February 1942
- Country: (British Raj) British India
- Allegiance: British Empire
- Branch: British Indian Army
- Type: Infantry
- Size: Brigade
- Part of: Malaya Command; III Corps (India)
- Engagements: Second World War Malayan Campaign

Commanders
- Notable commanders: Lieutenant Colonel Ian MacAlister Stewart

The 12th Indian Infantry Brigade was an infantry brigade at the outbreak of the Indian Army during World War II. It was sent to Singapore in August 1939 and took part in the Malayan Campaign before going into captivity with the Fall of Singapore in February 1942.

== History ==
The 12th Indian Infantry Brigade was one of the regular units based in Malaya before the Japanese invasion in December 1941. During the Battle of Malaya which ended with the surrender of a British Army at Singapore in February 1942, the 12th Brigade performed better than most units. One of its units, 2nd Bn, Argyll and Sutherland Highlanders, was considered to be the best jungle fighters at the time and the Argylls' commander, Lt.Col. Ian Stewart, one of the better leaders during the campaign. The brigade were among the first troops to face the Japanese when they landed on 7 December 1941 (See Japanese Invasion of Malaya).

While the rest of the British and Indian forces were thrown in disarray by the rapid encircling and flanking attacks of the Japanese, the 12th Brigade under Brigadier Archie Paris, was able to inflict casualties and slow down the Japanese forces during the fighting in Northern Malaya.

== Order of battle ==
=== December 1941 ===
- 5th Battalion, 2nd Punjab Regiment - Lt. Col. Charles Cecil Deakin
- 4th Battalion, 19th Hyderabad Regiment - Lt. Col. E.L.Wilson-Haffenden
- 2nd Battalion, Argyll and Sutherland Highlanders - Lt. Col. Ian MacAlister Stewart
- 15th Field Company S&M
- 122nd Field Regiment RA - Lieut. Col. George St.John Armitage Dyson

=== Battle of Slim River ===
- 5th Battalion, 2nd Punjab Regiment
- 4th Battalion, 19th Hyderabad Regiment
- 2nd Battalion, Argyll and Sutherland Highlanders
- 5th Battalion, 14th Punjab Regiment
- 15th Field Company S&M
- 137th Field Regiment RA

== Commanders ==
- Brig. Archibald Paris
- Lt. Col. Ian Stewart

== See also ==
- List of Indian Army Brigades in World War II

== Bibliography ==
- Kempton, Chris (2003b). 'Loyalty & Honour', The Indian Army September 1939 – August 1947. Vol. Part II Brigades. Milton Keynes: The Military Press. ISBN 0-85420-238-2.
