= Eli Thomas Reich =

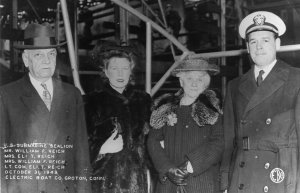
- Launching of USS Sealion, October 31, 1943 (L to R) Mr. William F. Reich, Mrs. Eli T. Reich, Mrs. William F. Reich, Lt.Cdr. Eli T. Reich
- Born: March 20, 1913; New York City, New York, U.S.
- Died: November 30, 1999 (aged 86); Arlington County, Virginia, U.S.
- Burial place: Arlington National Cemetery, U.S.
- Military career
- Allegiance: United States
- Branch: United States Navy
- Service years: 1935–1973
- Rank: Vice admiral
- Commands: USS Sealion (SS-315)
- Conflicts: World War II; Vietnam War
- Awards: Navy Cross (3); Distinguished Service Medal (2); Legion of Merit; Bronze Star Medal

Vice Admiral Eli Thomas Reich (March 20, 1913 in New York – November 30, 1999 in Arlington, Virginia) was a highly decorated United States Navy officer and World War II submarine commander — the only one to sink a battleship during the war. He is buried in Arlington National Cemetery (Section 30, Grave 950-A).

== World War II service ==
A 1935 graduate of the United States Naval Academy in Annapolis, Maryland, Reich attended the submarine school at New London, Connecticut, then in 1939 became executive officer and engineer on the first Sealion (SS-195). Sealion was the first US submarine damaged in World War II; it was bombed on December 10, 1941 while undergoing repairs at Cavite Navy Yard in the Philippines, and later scuttled, four men were killed and three others wounded during the bombing.

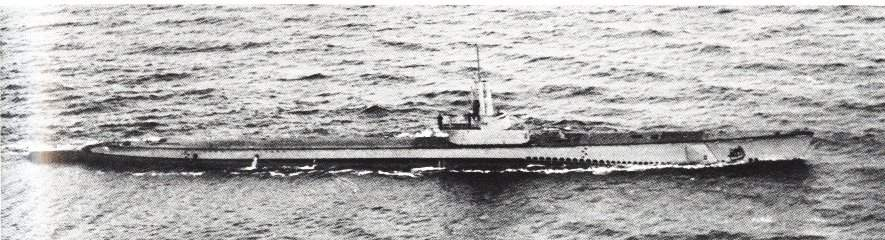
USS Sealion II, the ship which made his career

After Sealion was scuttled Reich served on the staff of the submarine commander at Corregidor and Bataan in the Philippines, escaping aboard Stingray (SS-186) before the surrender of U.S. forces there in the spring of 1942. He was executive officer aboard the Lapon (SS-260) in 1943, then in March 1944 assumed command of the second Sealion (SS-315).

Under Reich's command, Sealion II was credited with sinking the Kongō, the only Japanese battleship sunk by submarine during World War II, the destroyer Urakaze, and a prisoner of war ship, Rakuyo Maru. After sinking the POW ship, Sealion II surfaced and rescued 23 Australian and 31 British prisoners of war from the sea.

== Post-World War II ==
After the war Reich's assignments included duty in the office of the Chief of Naval Operations and study at the Armed Forces Staff College and the Industrial College of the Armed Forces.

In 1960-61 Reich commanded the missile cruiser Canberra (CAG-2). He was later made Assistant Chief of the Bureau of Naval Weapons, then from 1962 to 1965 Commander of the Surface Missile Project (which was key to the development of the "3-T" missile systems), and Commander of the anti-submarine warfare group in Southeast Asia during the early years of the Vietnam War. His last active duty assignment was Deputy Assistant Secretary of Defense for Logistics. Reich retired from the Navy a Vice Admiral (3 stars) on October 31, 1973 after 38 years of service.

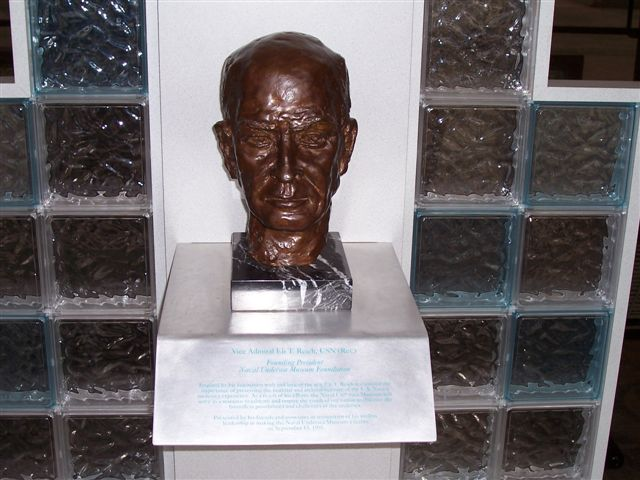
Eli Thomas Reich bust on display at the Naval Undersea Museum in Keyport, Washington. The bust was created by Felix de Weldon (who also created the USMC War Memorial better known as the Iwo Jima Memorial in Arlington National Cemetery). The plaque caption can be seen here.

Shortly after his retirement from the Navy, Reich was named director of the Emergency Energy Allocations Program, which was responsible for the distribution of oil and gasoline during the 1973 oil crisis. Described as a "crusty three-star admiral" by syndicated columnists Rowland Evans and Robert Novak, Admiral Reich was reported by the columnists to have told staff members:

I don't give a damn for the public image. We're not here to create an image. We're to do a job—my way. And that's the military way.

After a short time at the job, Admiral Reich clashed with energy chief William E. Simon, and he left the newly formed Department of Energy. Reich later did consulting on national security matters involving weapons systems acquisitions, shipbuilding and mobilization planning.

Reich is also credited with founding the Naval Undersea Museum in Keyport, Washington. After his retirement he created the Naval Undersea Museum Foundation which raised the funds, designed, and built the museum. The museum has since been donated to by the US Navy. Reich's family donated "many of his awards, battle flag, uniforms, and memorabilia to the museum after his death." The museum also commissioned an oil portrait and bust of him which are currently on display along with many of the families donations.

== Awards ==
Reich received the Navy Cross three times, the second-highest decoration for valor the United States Navy awards, after the Medal of Honor, for "extraordinary heroism" as commander of the Sealion II from its March 8, 1944 commissioning until relieved by Lieutenant Commander Charles F. Putnam on December 4, 1944. Reich was also twice awarded the Navy Distinguished Service Medal, once awarded the Legion of Merit, and received the Bronze Star.

In 1963 the American Society of Naval Engineers awarded Eli T. Reich the Gold Medal Award for his work on Surface Missile Systems. The Gold Medal Award, has been awarded annually since 1958, and is given to an individual who has made a significant naval engineering contribution in a particular area during the past five years.

In the field of naval engineering, the nominee must have made a most significant contribution through personal effort, or through the direction of others, during or culminating in the five-year period ending in the current year. Evidence of personal involvement shall be explicitly stated. If, for security reasons, the evidence cannot be publicly disclosed, the statement should be sufficiently specific for recognition of the accomplishment by those qualified to assess it.

In the early 1990s the Naval Academy honored Reich at a "Heroes of WWII" dinner. There is also a "VADM Eli T. Reich Building" named in his honor at Naval Surface Warfare Center Port Hueneme Division (NSWC PHD) (formerly Naval Ship Weapon Systems Engineering Station, or NSWSES) in Port Hueneme, California. This building is one of the station's on site engineering facilities, housing combat system simulators, selected weapon systems and combat systems equipment, and much of the other shipboard equipment for which NSWC PHD is the designated In-Service Engineering Agent (ISEA).
