= Japanese destroyer Tanikaze (1940) =

Kagerō-class destroyer

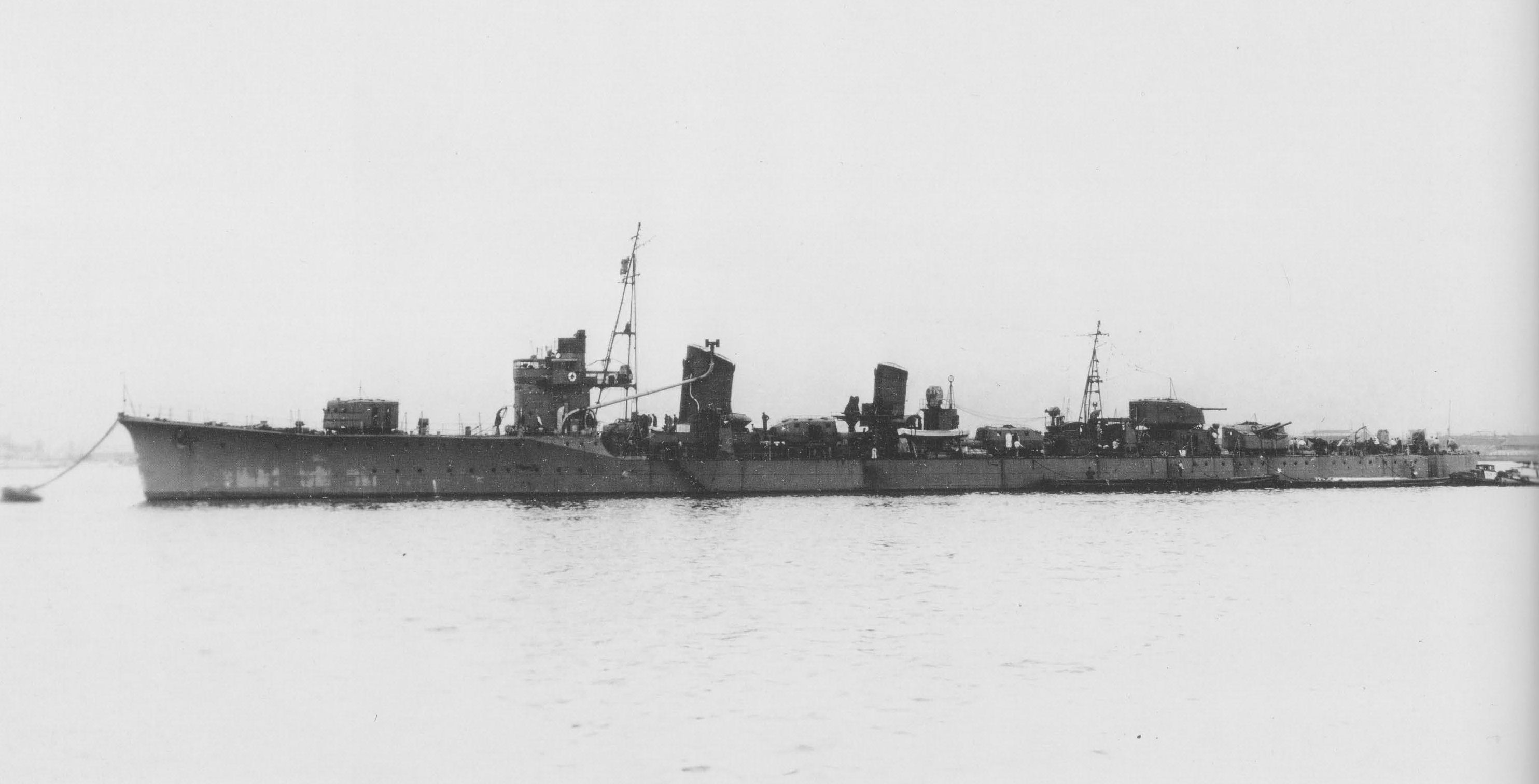
- Tanikaze upon commissioning, April 1941

History

Empire of Japan
- Name: Tanikaze
- Builder: Fujinagata Shipyards, Osaka
- Launched: 1 November 1940
- Commissioned: 25 April 1941
- Stricken: 10 August 1944
- Fate: Torpedoed and sunk 9 June 1944

General characteristics
- Class & type: Kagerō-class destroyer
- Displacement: 2,490 long tons (2,530 t)
- Length: 118.5 m (388 ft 9 in)
- Beam: 10.8 m (35 ft 5 in)
- Draft: 3.8 m (12 ft 6 in)
- Speed: 35 knots (65 km/h; 40 mph)
- Complement: 240
- Armament: 6 × 127 mm (5.0 in)/50 caliber DP guns; up to 28 × Type 96 25 mm (0.98 in) AA guns; up to 4 × 13.2 mm (0.52 in) AA guns; 8 × 610 mm (24 in) torpedo tubes; 36 depth charges

Tanikaze (谷風; Valley Wind) was one of 19 Kagerō-class destroyers built for the Imperial Japanese Navy during the 1930s, which saw extensive action throughout World War II, spending her early war career operating alongside Japanese aircraft carriers. Tanikaze was damaged by American dive bomber aircraft during the Battle of Midway, 6 June 1942, and helped to sink the light cruiser USS Helena at the battle of Kula Gulf on 6 July 1943. Tanikaze was eventually torpedoed and sunk by the submarine USS Harder on 9 June 1944.

== Design and description ==
The Kagerō class was an enlarged and improved version of the preceding Asashio class. Their crew numbered 240 officers and enlisted men. The ships measured 118.5 meters (388 ft 9 in) overall, with a beam of 10.8 meters (35 ft 5 in) and a draft of 3.76 meters (12 ft 4 in). They displaced 2,065 metric tons (2,032 long tons) at standard load and 2,529 metric tons (2,489 long tons) at deep load. The ships had two Kampon geared steam turbines, each driving one propeller shaft, using steam provided by three Kampon water-tube boilers. The turbines were rated at a total of 52,000 shaft horsepower (39,000 kW) for a designed speed of 35 knots (65 km/h; 40 mph). The ships had a range of 5,000 nautical miles (9,300 km; 5,800 mi) at a speed of 18 knots (33 km/h; 21 mph).

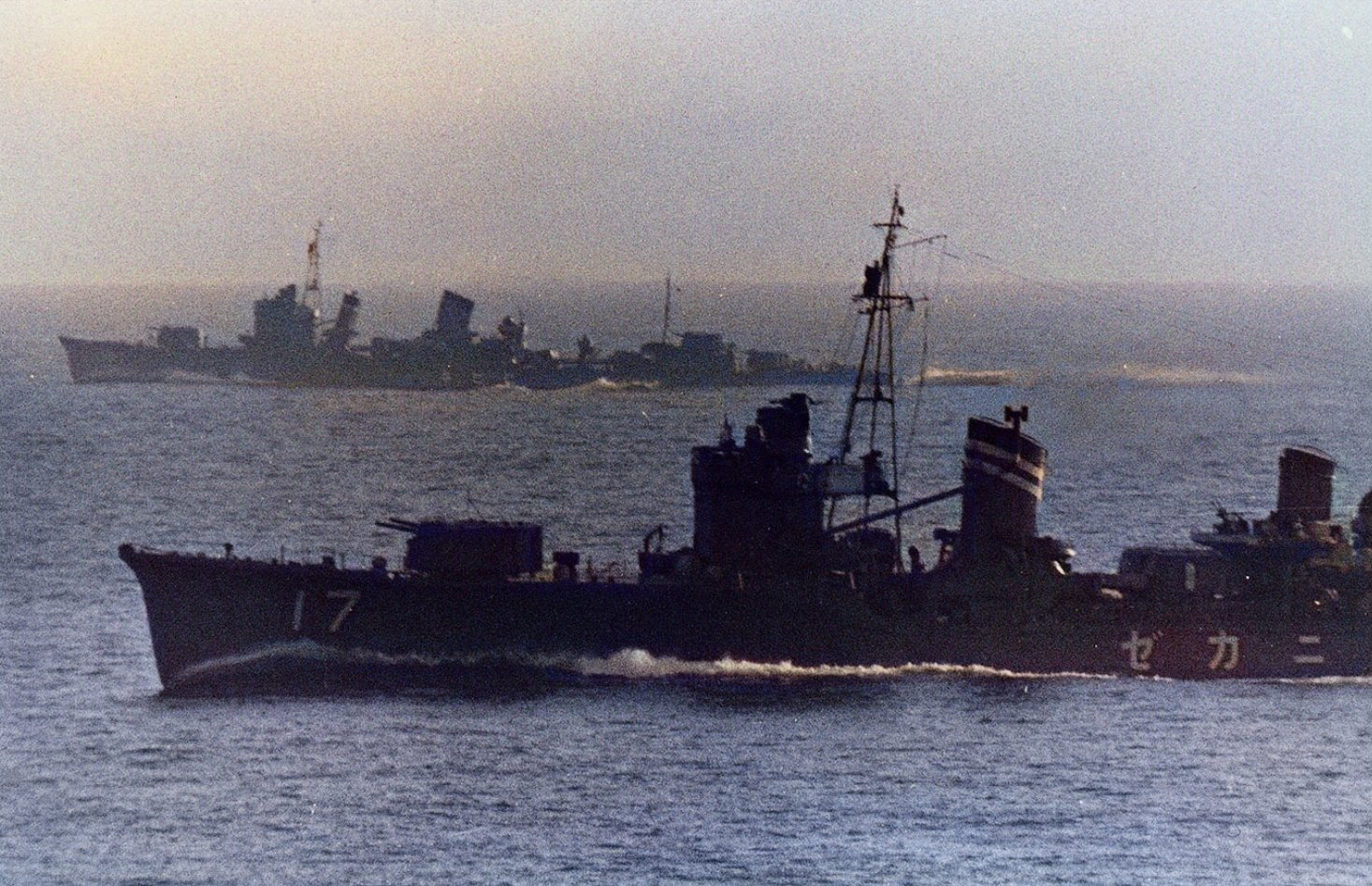
Tanikaze on training missions off the Bungo Strait, 16 October 1941. The destroyer Hibiki can be seen in the background.

The main armament of the Kagerō class consisted of six Type 3 127-millimeter (5.0 in) guns in three twin-gun turrets, one superfiring pair aft and one turret forward of the superstructure. They were built with four Type 96 25-millimeter (1.0 in) anti-aircraft guns in two twin-gun mounts, but more of these guns were added over the course of the war. The ships were also armed with eight 610-millimeter (24.0 in) torpedo tubes for the oxygen-fueled Type 93 "Long Lance" torpedo in two quadruple traversing mounts; one reload was carried for each tube. Their anti-submarine weapons comprised 16 depth charges.

== Construction and commissioning ==
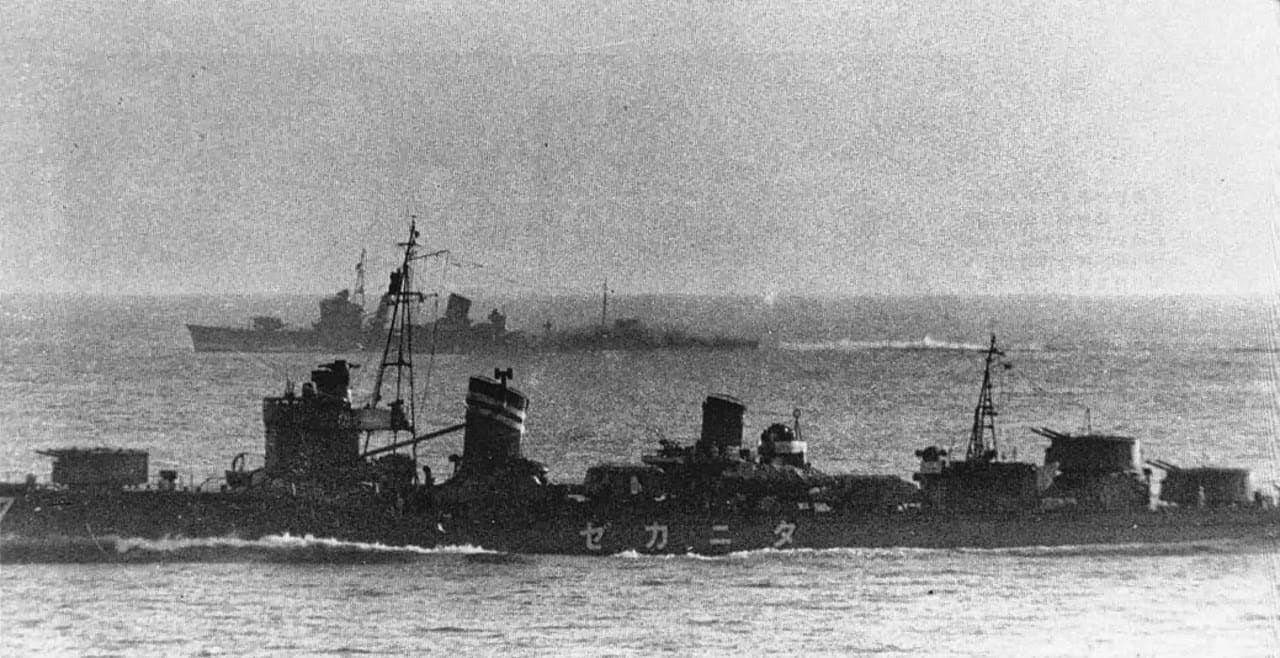
Tanikaze overtaking Hibiki

The ore that eventually became the Tanikaze was delivered to the Fujinagata Shipyards for the construction of a new Kagerō-class destroyer. Tanikaze was laid down on 18 October 1939, launched on 1 November 1940, and commissioned on 26 April 1941. Commander Katsumi Motoi was delegated to Tanikaze upon commissioning. She was assigned as the second ship of destroyer division 17 (Urakaze, Tanikaze, Isokaze, Hamakaze)

== World War II ==
=== Attack on Pearl Harbor ===
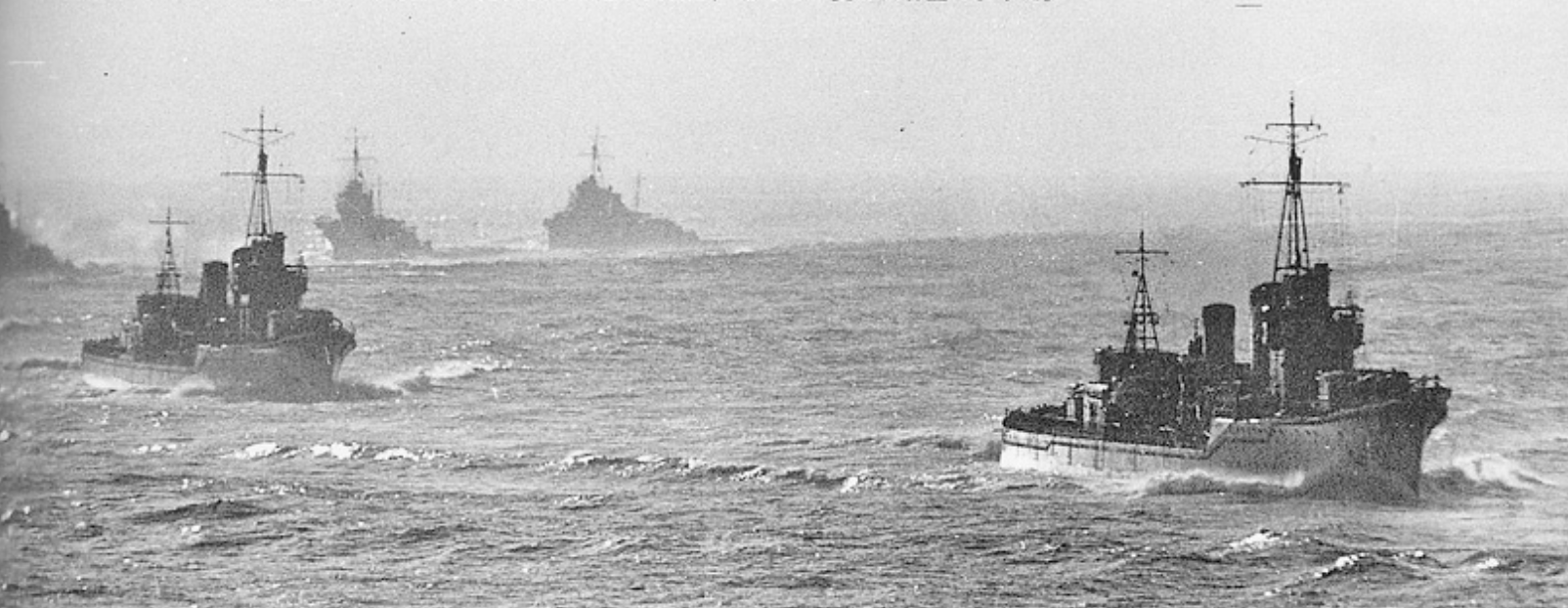
Urakaze leading Tanikaze, with destroyer division 27 behind them

From 18–22 November, Tanikaze steamed from Saeki to Hitokappu Bay to meet up with the Kido Butai, Japan's major aircraft carrier force consisting of the fleet carriers Akagi, Kaga, Sōryū, Hiryū, Shōkaku, and Zuikaku. Tanikaze, along with six other Kagerō-class destroyers and two Asashio-class destroyers, was tasked with escorting the Kido Butai to a surprise Attack on Pearl Harbor, a major American naval port and facility in Oahu, Hawaii Territory. On 26 November, Tanikaze and the other ships departed Hitokappu Bay destined for Pearl Harbor. The force cruised at 18 knots (33 km/h; 21 mph) for 11 days, and on 7 December 1941, the Japanese carriers launched their attack. Two massive waves of aircraft sank or critically damaged 18 American ships, including several US battleships, and in turn suffered only 29 aircraft and 4 midget submarines sunk. As there were no attacks on the Kido Butai, Tanikaze did not see direct combat, and after the attack was over, she initially escorted the carriers to Kure, but en route Sōryū and Hiryū broke off to attack Wake Island, and took Tanikaze with them. On 21 December, they attacked Wake Island, assisting in capturing the island. Tanikaze escorted the pair back to Kure, and arrived on 29 December.

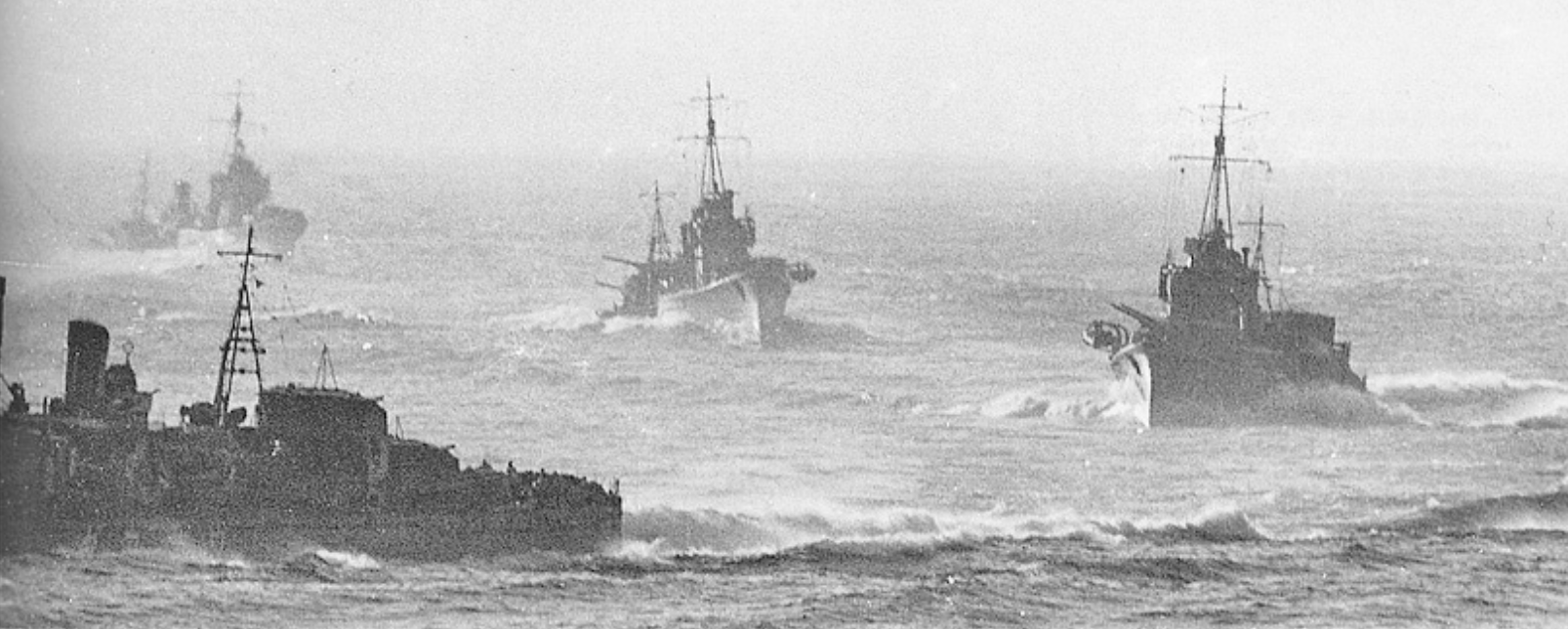
Urakaze leading Isokaze, Tanikaze, and Hamakaze, 16 October 1941

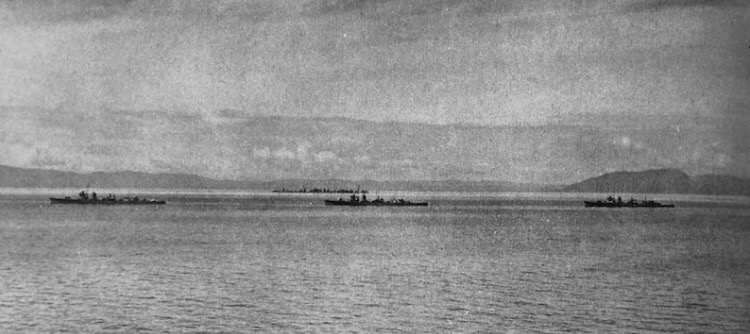
Hamakaze, Tanikaze, and Isokaze anchored in Saeki Bay in preparation for the attack on Pearl Harbor, November 1941

On 8 January 1942, Tanikaze escorted Shōkaku and Zuikaku from Kure to Truk, arriving on the 12th, before escorting them during strikes on Rabaul on the 20th. Three days later, Tanikaze escorted Akagi and Kaga during attacks on Kavieng, before withdrawing to Truk on the 27th. On 19 February, Tanikaze escorted Akagi, Kaga, Sōryū and Hiryū during an air strike on Port Darwin which sank eight troopships and the destroyer USS Peary. The destroyer escorted the carriers throughout operations in the Java Sea, then on 7 March, Tanikaze escorted the battleships Kongō and Haruna during the bombardment of Christmas Island. Tanikaze fired her guns for the first time bombarding the island with her 12.7 cm (5 in) guns, leading to a successful capture and surrender of Allied troops. On 27 March, Tanikaze departed alongside the Kido Butai to escort them during the Indian Ocean raid, which lasted throughout early April and sank several major British warships. On 27 April, Tanikaze finally returned to mainland Japan, and was drydocked in Kure for maintenance.

=== Battle of Midway ===
On 4 June 1942 Tanikaze escorted the Japanese aircraft carriers at the battle of Midway, intended to destroy the US aircraft carrier fleet. However, Admiral Nagumo exposed bombs, fuel, and other munitions in the hangar bay due to rearming his aircraft to land attacks, and when formations of planes from US aircraft carriers attacked, Tanikaze witnessed the sinking of the aircraft carriers Akagi, Kaga, and Sōryū as she attempted to fend off air attacks. The next day, Tanikaze was sent by Admiral Nagumo to ensure the last IJN aircraft carrier Hiryū had actually sunk, to scuttle her if necessary, and collect any survivors.

Tanikaze had the unfortunate luck of being seen by 61 US Dauntless dive bombers sent to destroy Hiryū if she was still afloat. After they were unable to locate the aircraft carrier (she had sunk about an hour earlier), the dive bombers turned back to simultaneously attack the hapless Japanese destroyer, since their bombs needed to be jettisoned before landing anyway. Through aggressive maneuvering (zig zagging) by the ship's commander Katsumi Motoi (勝見 基), not one of the 61 dive bombers managed a direct hit, although shell fragments and shrapnel from a near-miss slashed across the No.3 aft 12.7 cm gun turret and triggering an explosion inside the turret that killed all of its six crew. Anti-aircraft fire from the Tanikaze managed to down one of the attacking dive bombers, piloted by Lt. Adams of USS Enterprise's VS-5, plunged into the wake of the maneuvering destroyer. A short time later, five Boeing B-17 Flying Fortress level bombers operating out of Midway attacked Tanikaze from an elevation of 11,000 feet (3,400 m). The bombers scored no hits. Tanikaze counted 11 bombers during this particular attack due to some of the B-17s making multiple attack runs. One of the B-17s accidentally jettisoned its auxiliary fuel tanks along with its bombs and was lost with all its crew (another B-17 was lost due to fuel shortage on its way back as well). Tanikaze arrived too late to inspect the Hiryū's hulk, which had already sunk, and instead returned to rendezvous with the combined fleet.

=== Operations in Guadalcanal and Solomon Islands ===
After the Battle of Midway, it was off to the Guadalcanal campaign. On 13 July, Tanikaze was reassigned to the 3rd fleet, and on 8 August steamed from Saipan to Kure, arriving on the 14th. Two days later, Tanikaze departed on a troop transport run to Guadalcanal, arriving on the 18th, then on the 25th Tanikaze escorted the Milne Bay invasion force, and between the 28–29 July, transported more troops to Milne Bay. On 1 September, Tanikaze took part in another troop transport run to Guadalcanal, then on 4–6 September escorted a convoy from the Shortlands to Rabaul. For the rest of September and into most of October, Tanikaze took part on patrol duties off north of the Soloman Islands. On 11 October, Tanikaze departed as an escort to Japanese aircraft carriers during an attempt to lure out and sink American shipping off Guadalcanal, mostly operating alongside Admiral Abe's vanguard force. On the 15th, Zuikaku sank the destroyer USS Meredith, and on the 26th American aircraft carriers intercepted the Japanese ships in what became known as the battle of Santa Cruz. Several ships were damaged, but none were sunk, and Tanikaze avoided any damage whatsoever. In exchange, the Japanese planes sank the aircraft carrier USS Hornet and the destroyer USS Porter, ending the battle in a Japanese victory. After the battle, Tanikaze escorted the heavy cruiser Chikuma, which was damaged by dive bombers from Hornet, arriving at Truk on the 29th. After escorting the light carrier Zuihō and the heavy cruiser Kumano to Japan, Tanikaze was drydocked in Kure from 2–7 November for maintenance.

From 22 November to 4 December, Tanikaze escorted Kumano from Kure to Manila, then to the Shortlands on the 5th. On 7 December, Tanikaze attempted a supply run to Guadalcanal, but this was aborted due to PT boat attacks. However, another effort was made on the 11th, which turned out successfully as Tanikaze delivered her supplies to the Guadalcanal Islands. Then on the 16th and 21st Tanikaze departed on two separate troop transport runs to Munda. On 25 December, troop ship Nankai Maru was torpedoed by a submarine and had accidentally collided with the destroyer Uzuki during evasive maneuvers, which prompted Tanikaze to depart from Rabaul and escort both ships to repairs. Tanikaze rounded out 1942 with a troop transport run to New Georgia the next day. From 5–10 January 1943, Tanikaze escorted a troop convoy to Lae and back, then on the 14th departed on a troop transport run to Guadalcanal. The next day, air attacks engaged Tanikaze, which suffered near miss damage. Tanikaze herself was not significantly damaged, but shrapnel hit and killed Commander Katsumi Motoi.

From 16–26 January, Tanikaze was drydocked for repairs, during which commander Tomura Kiyoshi was given command of the destroyer. Upon repairs. she engaged in a troop transport run to the Russell Islands. With the start of 1943, the Japanese combined fleet admiralty finally decided to cut their losses and retreat from Guadalcanal. Tanikaze took part in both the first and second evacuations on 1 and 4 February respectively, and on 7–8 February redirected those troops to the Russell Islands and Rabaul, and then arrived at Truk on the 11th, where she remained until the end of March. From 29 March to 3 April, she escorted convoys to Palau, then between 6 April to the 20th escorted a large troop convoy from Palau to Hansa Bay and Wewak, then back to Palau. During the journey, the troop transport India Maru was bombed and sunk by allied aircraft. On 26 April, Tanikaze returned to Truk, and upon arrival Tomura Kiyoshi was relieved by commander Maeda Shinichirou. From 28 April to 1 May, Tanikaze escorted the supply ship Irako to Iwa Jima, then took part in several more troop transport runs and escorting duties.

=== Battle of Kula Gulf ===
On 5 July, a few elderly destroyer transports led by the destroyer Niizuki had attempted a troop transport run to Kolombangara, but were intercepted by a US cruiser destroyer group. None of the Japanese ships were damaged, and in turn Niizuki torpedoed and sank the destroyer USS Strong, but the troop transport mission was aborted. The next day, 6 July 1943, seven other destroyers carrying some 2,600 Japanese ground troop would attempt another troop transport run to Vila. Tanikaze was one of three destroyers to serve in the protection force, the last ship of the flotilla, with Niizuki taking the lead and Suzukaze between the two ships. In the night, the same cruiser destroyer force Niizuki encountered the previous day located Tanikaze's group, and the three light cruisers, USS Helena, USS St. Louis, and USS Honolulu opened fire and all blasted Niizuki, leaving her limping at 11 knots and ablaze before she was torpedoed by the destroyer USS Nicholas and sank with only a dozen or so survivors.

However, Tanikaze and Suzukaze were undamaged, and when Helena ran out of flashless powder, the ensuing gun flashes attracted their attention. Tanikaze fired eight torpedoes at the enemy shortly after Suzukaze, with a total of 16 type 93 torpedoes swimming their way towards the enemy cruisers. One of these torpedoes hit Helena, probably igniting her turret 1 magazines which wrecked her forward turrets, tore a hole almost to the keel, and blew off the entire bow, about a 150-foot (46 m) portion of the cruiser. Two minutes later, two more torpedoes hit amidships, destroying her engine room and boilers and breaking her keel, alongside disabling all electrical power. Dead in the water and adrift, the abandon ship order was almost immediately issued by Helena's captain. Helena began to lose all structural stability as the girders began to collapse, shortly thereafter she further broke in two. The center third of the ship quickly sank, while the severed bow and stern remained afloat for several hours but inevitably sank as well with the total loss of 168 men.

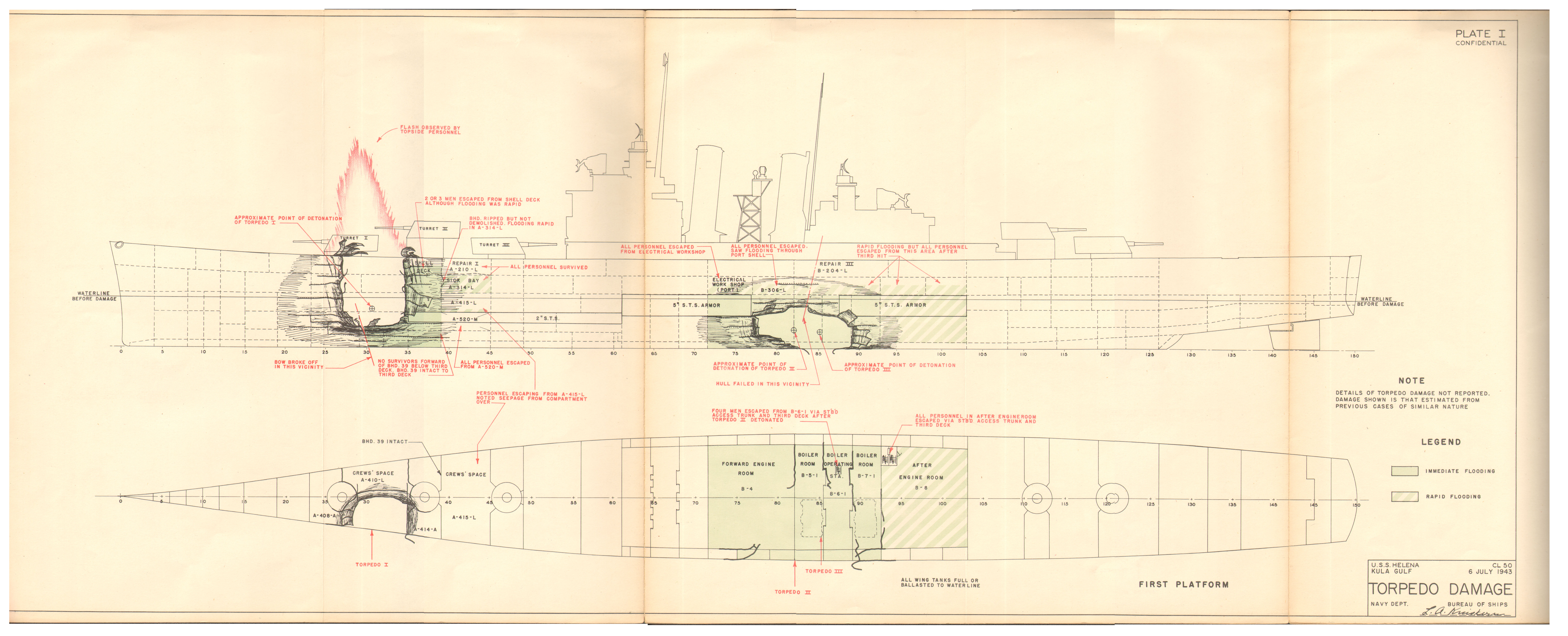
A drawling depicting the torpedo damage to the light cruiser USS Helena inflicted by Tanikaze and Suzukaze

With their fellow cruiser sunk, St. Louis and Honolulu and their destroyers targeted the remaining Japanese destroyers. USS O'Bannon and Radford each unloaded a full spread of 10 torpedoes at Tanikaze, but none hit. Tanikaze was instead hit by a 6-inch (152 mm) shell, but it failed to explode and only caused cosmetic damage. Managing to withdraw from the battle, she reloaded their torpedo tubes, and after returning to the scene of the engagement Tanikaze along with Suzukaze attempted to search for Niizuki survivors but failed to locate any, and they managed to come within firing range of the destroyer Nicholas but failed to engage. Tanikaze regrouped with the troop transport force, which successfully landed 1,600 troops to Kolombangara.

=== Later operations ===
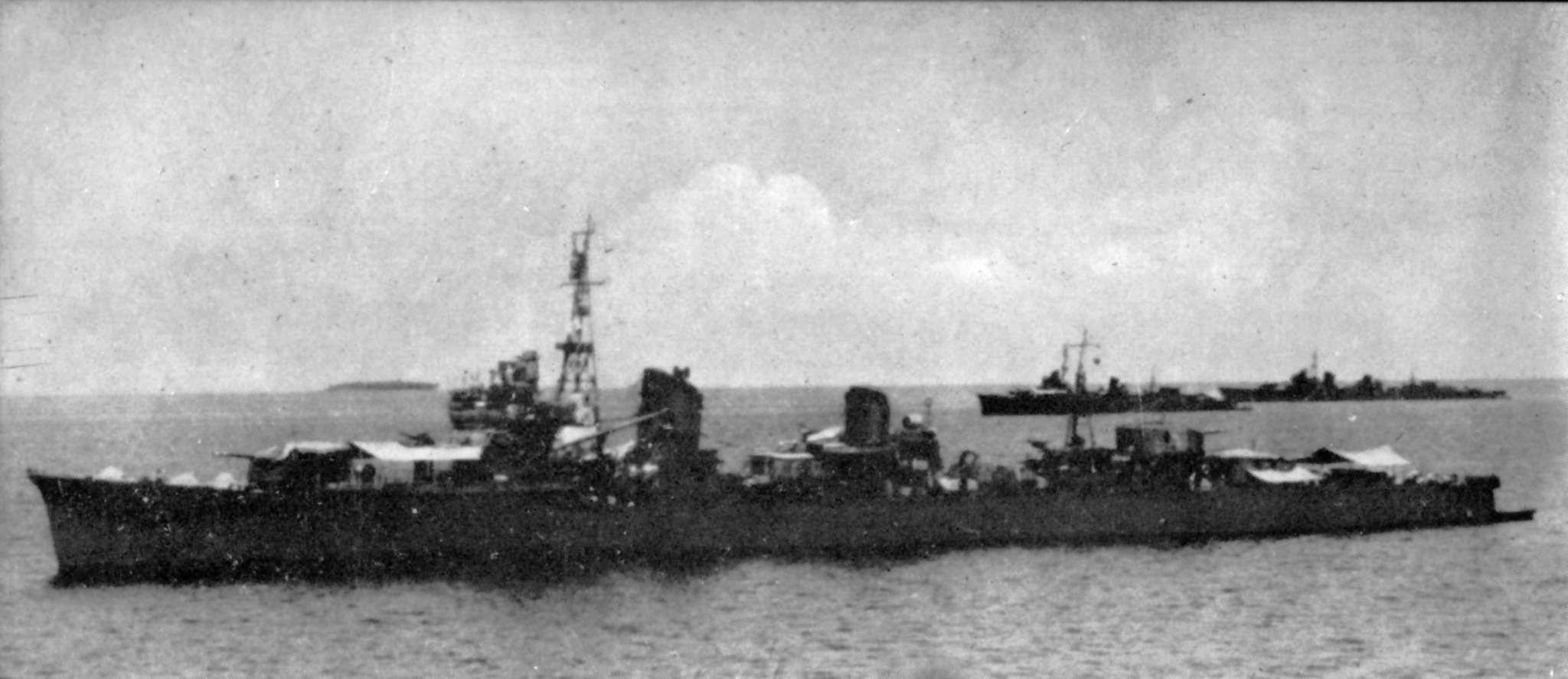
Tanikaze (background left) anchored in Rabaul in July 1943 alongside the destroyers Yukikaze (foreground) and Kiyonami (background right).

On 9 July, Tanikaze departed to cover another troop transport run to Kolombangara, this time not seeing combat, then on the 13–15 July she steamed from Rabaul to Truk, where she stayed for four days. From the 19th she departed Truk to escort the aircraft carrier Jun'yō to Kure, arriving on the 24th, where she remained until 15 August to escort Jun'yō to Saeki, then to Singapore, then back to Kure, a journey which lasted until 11 September, and finally from 19–24 September Tanikaze escorted Jun'yō on a troop transport mission to Truk. From 26–28 September, she then escorted the light cruisers Kiso and Tama on a troop transport run to Ponape and back to Truk, From 17–26 October, Tanikaze escorted the battleship fleet in search of US carriers, but no action occurred, and the force returned to Truk. On 31 October, Tanikaze escorted several large warships to Kure, during which the aircraft carrier Junyō was damaged by a torpedo from the submarine USS Halibut, prompting Tanikaze to rescue a pair of Junyō sailors which were thrown overboard by the explosion. They arrived on 6 November, where she was drydocked for repairs for the rest of the month. The "damage" caused by the 6-inch (152 mm) dud hit back during the battle of Kula Gulf was finally repaired. Tanikaze also had her "X" turret removed and replaced with 25 mm automatic cannons. Upon the refit's completion, she escorted the Shōkaku from Yokosuka to Truk and back. Tanikaze then finished off 1943 escorting the battleship Yamato from Yokosuka to Truk, before leaving Truk on December 20. On the 25th, Yamato was attacked by the submarine USS Skate and mildly damaged by a torpedo hit, and in response Tanikaze joined the destroyer Yamagumo in closing to Skate's position for a depth charge attack, but failed to inflict damage as Skate escaped.

Starting off 1944, Tanikaze escorted the heavy cruisers Kumano and Suzuya on a troop transport run to Kavieng, then helped to tow the torpedoed troop ship Kiyozumi Maru to Truk, and from 10–27 January escorted tankers from Truk to Palau and back, then did the same for fleet units from 1–8 February, them from the 16th to 22nd escorted fleet units from Palau to Lingga. Then from 11 March to 26 April Tanikaze escorted convoys to Davao, Balikpapan, and Saipan, then escorted more convoys to Davao and Tawitawi.

=== Sinking ===
On 9 June, Tanikaze departed on patrol duty off Tawitawi along with the destroyer Isokaze. It also happened that the submarine USS Harder was also on patrol duties and was looking for Japanese shipping to sink, having just sunk the destroyers Minazuki and Hayanami three and two days earlier. It was in the evening that Harder spotted Tanikaze en route and closed to some 1,000 yards (910 m) and fired four torpedoes. Two of these torpedoes made their mark, followed by Tanikaze's boilers exploding and sinking her nearly instantly. The exact location was 05°42′N 120°41′E. Despite how fast and violently Tanikaze sank, only 114 crew members were killed, while 126 men managed to escape, including her commander Lieutenant Commander Shunsaku Ikeda (who died two days later) and were rescued by Isokaze and Urakaze.
