= Arthur Varley =

Australian Army officer

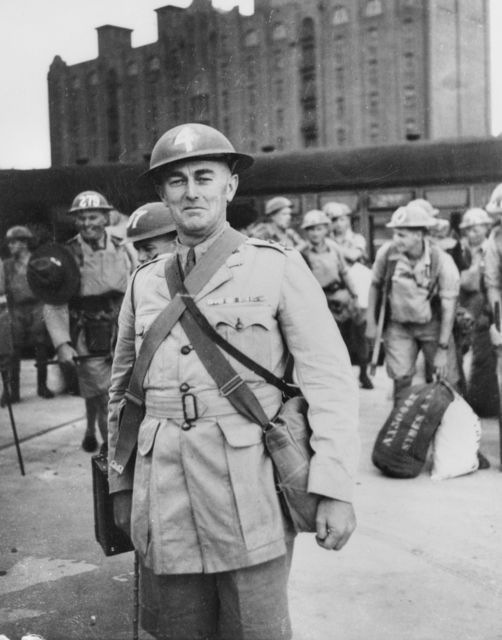
- Arthur Varley, then a lieutenant colonel and commanding officer of 2/18th Battalion, waiting to embark for Malaya, 5 February 1941
- Born: 13 October 1893; Rookwood, Australia
- Died: 13 September 1944 (aged 50); Near Hainan, South China Sea
- Military career
- Allegiance: Australia
- Branch: Australian Army
- Service years: 1915–1920; 1939–1944
- Rank: Brigadier
- Service number: NX35005
- Commands: A Force (1942–44); 22nd Infantry Brigade (1942); 2/18th Battalion (1940–42); 35th Battalion (1939–40)
- Conflicts: First World War; Western Front; Second World War; Malayan campaign; Fall of Singapore (POW)
- Awards: Military Cross & bar Mentioned in Despatches (2)

Brigadier Arthur Leslie Varley, MC & Bar (13 October 1893 – 13 September 1944) was an Australian soldier who served in the First and the Second World Wars. He was commander of the 22nd Infantry Brigade during the final stages of the Battle of Singapore in the Second World War. Having surrendered to the Japanese, he was responsible for over 9,000 prisoners of war engaged in the construction of the Burma-Thailand Railway. He was killed in September 1944 when the transport ship taking him and several hundred fellow prisoners to Japan was sunk by an American submarine.

== Early life ==
Arthur Leslie Varley was born on 13 October 1893 in Rookwood, Sydney, the third child of a telegraph operator, William Varley, and his wife Elizabeth née Stubbin. After completing his schooling, he gained employment as a clerk.

== First World War ==
At the age of 21, Varley enlisted in the Australian Imperial Force (AIF) and was shipped to Egypt in October 1915. He was assigned to 45th Battalion, a unit formed largely from men from New South Wales as the AIF expanded following the Gallipoli Campaign. By August 1916, he had been promoted to lieutenant and was serving with the battalion on the Western Front.

In 1917, Varley was awarded the Military Cross (MC) following a recommendation made by his commanding officer, Lieutenant Colonel Edmund Herring, for his actions during the Battle of Messines. The citation, published in The London Gazette, read:

For conspicuous gallantry and devotion to duty. When two companies had become dis-organised under heavy shell fire and had lost all their officers, he went forward and organised them. He afterwards did most valuable work in organising a counter-attack, and his coolness under fire and utter disregard of personal danger were most marked throughout.

— London Gazette, No. 30251, 25 August 1917.

In August 1918, now serving on the staff of 12th Brigade with the rank of captain, Varley was awarded a bar to his MC. The published citation noted that the bar was awarded for:

...conspicuous gallantry and devotion to duty during an attack. He went forward through heavy fire, supervised the collection of ammunition, water, and material, and delivered them to the battalion holding the captured position, thus supplying them with sufficient to hold off an enemy counter-attack. By his courage and initiative he rendered very valuable service.

— London Gazette, No. 30997, 7 November 1918.

Three months later the war came to an end due to the armistice of 11 November 1918. In July 1919, Varley was mentioned in despatches and his service with the AIF ended later that year when he returned to Australia.

== Interwar period ==
In December 1919, Varley married Linda, with whom he had three children. Linda died in 1925, and a year later, he married Ethel. He owned a grazing property, and also worked with Ethel's brother at a stock and station agency. He had an interest in the militia, the Citizens Force, and was commander of 35th Battalion from September 1939, when the Second World War began. By the end of the year he had been promoted to temporary lieutenant colonel.

== Second World War ==
Varley was seconded to the Second Australian Imperial Force in 1940 and placed in command of 2/18th Battalion, part of 22nd Brigade and destined for Malaya. Much of his command was drawn from the Armidale region. His son, Jack, was also present in Malaya as part of 2/19th Battalion. Once stationed in Mersing, the brigade engaged in training more suitable to the jungle environment than it had experienced to date.

Following the invasion of Malaya by the Empire of Japan, the 22nd Brigade was forced into fighting a series of rear guard actions against the advancing Japanese. Varley's command did not engage the Japanese until 26 January 1942, when it implemented an ambush near Jemaluang. While successful, the effectiveness of the ambush had been compromised by the Japanese advancing more quickly than expected. The action was cut short when the brigade's commander, Brigadier Harold Burfield Taylor, ordered Varley to withdraw to Jameluang. Nearly 100 of Varley's men were killed or captured. The brigade later withdrew to Singapore Island, taking up positions on the north western coast of the island. Varley's battalion was located between the Sarimbum and Murai Rivers, with a machine-gun platoon in support.

On 8 February, the Japanese commenced an artillery bombardment of 22nd Brigade's sector but even though Varley later noted that it was heavier than what he had undergone in the First World War, casualties in his battalion were light. That night the Japanese launched landings on the sector held by Varley's battalion and were able to outflank and put pressure on his positions. Varley eventually ordered a withdrawal to the village of Ama Keng, to the rear of the battalion's sector. The battalion was now down to half strength and was ordered further back to Bulim. By 12 February, the Japanese were well established on Singapore Island and advancing on all fronts. Brigadier Taylor had become extremely fatigued and asked Varley, whose battalion had been in reserve since the previous day, to take over temporary command of 22nd Brigade. The following day, the divisional commander, Major General Gordon Bennett, promoted Varley to brigadier and made him the permanent commander of the brigade; the command lasted only a few more days before the surrender of Singapore on 15 February.

=== Prisoner of war ===
After the surrender, Varley, and the majority of his fellow AIF captives were imprisoned at Selarang Barracks near Changi Prison. When the first major contingent of Australian prisoners, totalling around 3,000 men and designated A Force departed Changi in May 1942, Varley was placed in command. A Force was shipped in cramped conditions to Burma where it was engaged in the construction of airfields. Initially, conditions were good and men were paid for their work (although the Japanese deducted expenses) which allowed them to buy rations. Consequently, the prisoner's general condition improved from what it was in Changi. To capitalise on this, Varley endeavoured to keep as many men as possible working. Eventually, the airfield work was completed, and in September 1942, A Force was shipped to Thanbyuzayat to start work on the northern start line for the Burma-Thailand Railway.

At Thanbyuzayat, other groups of prisoners were gradually brought into the camp, and these came under Varley's jurisdiction such that he was eventually responsible for 9,000 men in total. To manage A Force, which was spread out across a series of camp to the southeast, he had a small headquarters, with departments responsible for food, medical care and so forth. During his time in Burma, Varley constantly agitated to improve conditions as much as possible for the men under his command. He also tried to keep as many men as possible working. This meant that a possibly more cordial relationship existed with the Japanese at Thanbyuzayat than elsewhere, to the benefit of the welfare of the men under his charge. Although corrupt and prone to stealing the Australian's supplies, the Japanese commander also seemed to be more lenient than other commandants in charge of prison camps in the region.

In June 1943, the camp at Thanbyuzayat, adjacent a railway yard, was bombed by Allied aircraft during which Varley was slightly wounded. The camp was evacuated the next day and the prisoners moved to a more remote site. Despite his best efforts, the quality of food began to decline and this impacted on the health of the men, and the death rate. By early 1944, and the railway now completed, most prisoners had been moved to Thailand. At this stage, the death rate of A Force was a little over 13%, a much lower rate than in other prisoner of war parties. Much of this is attributed to Varley's efforts on behalf of his men.

It had been intended that the surviving prisoners of A Force be transported to Japan. However, the Japanese were experiencing difficulty in getting shipping to Japan and so it was decided to initially return the prisoners, including Varley, to Singapore. In September, after a few months in Singapore, Varley was placed in command of a party of 2,300 prisoners to be transported to Japan from Singapore. However, on 12 September his transport, the Rakuyo Maru, carrying around 1,250 prisoners, was amongst those torpedoed off Hainan by the United States submarine USS Sealion. The prisoners all successfully abandoned ship but the escorting destroyers only recovered the Japanese crew of the sunken ship. The prisoners were left to their own devices although they were able to board eleven abandoned life boats. The life boats split into two groups, one sailing to the west and the other to east. The easterly party, Varley amongst them, were not seen again. When the westerly party were picked up by passing Japanese shipping, they reported hearing gunfire coming from the east. It was assumed that Japanese navy vessels destroyed the lifeboats of the easterly party, killing all on board.

== Legacy ==
For his services in Malaya, Varley was posthumously recognised with a mention in despatches. He was survived by his second wife and his children from his first marriage, a daughter and two sons. His elder son, Jack, was awarded a Military Cross for his exploits during the Malayan campaign and survived the war. Robert, the younger son, also joined the AIF but was killed in action in New Guinea in April 1945.

Prior to the fall of Singapore, Varley began a secret diary which he maintained for much of his captivity. The diary detailed the daily life of the prisoners, construction of the railroad and also provided accounts of various war crimes committed by his captors. Before he was transferred to Singapore with the rest of A Force, he buried the diary which by now amounted to several volumes. The diaries were retrieved after the war and used as evidence in war crime trials of several Japanese officers.
