= Winston Ide =

- Born: Winston Philip James Ide; 17 September 1914 Sydney, Australia
- Died: 12 September 1944 (aged 29) SS Rakuyo Maru, Luzon Strait, South China Sea

Rugby union career
- Position: Centre
International career
| Years | Team | Apps | (Points) |
| 1938 | Australia | 2 | (0) |

Winston Philip James Ide (17 September 1914 – 12 September 1944) was an Australian rugby union player. Ide played two Tests for the Australia national team in 1938. He was among the Allied prisoners of war (POWs) killed during the sinking of the Rakuyō Maru in September 1944.

Ide was a member of the Australia team sent to tour Great Britain in 1939. The outbreak of World War II saw the tour cancelled the day after the team had arrived at Plymouth.

On return to Australia, Ide joined the Second Australian Imperial Force and was sent to Malaya with the 2/10th Field Regiment. He was captured during the Fall of Singapore in February 1942 and interned in Changi Prison as a prisoner of war. Ide was later forced by the Japanese to work on the construction of the Burma Railway.

In 1944 Ide was boarded on the Rakuyō Maru – a Japanese "Hell Ship" – to be taken to Japan to work. The Rakuyō Maru was sunk in the South China Sea by a torpedo fired from the USS Sealion, an American submarine. The Americans were unaware the ship was transporting Allied POWs. Refusing to climb aboard a life raft, Ide assisted in the rescue of many of his fellow POWs. Responding to requests to save himself, Ide was reported to have said "I'm staying here ... In any case, I can swim to Australia if I have to".

Ide was not seen again and was presumed drowned - one of 1,159 POWs aboard the ship who died. Only 63 could be rescued.

Ide's father, Henry, was a Japanese silk merchant who migrated to Australia in 1894 and was naturalised in 1902. During World War II, Ide's father was for a time placed in an internment camp at Hay in southern New South Wales as a suspected enemy alien.
