= USS Sealion (SS-195) =

American WWII submarine

Coordinates: 14°29′24″N 120°54′46″E

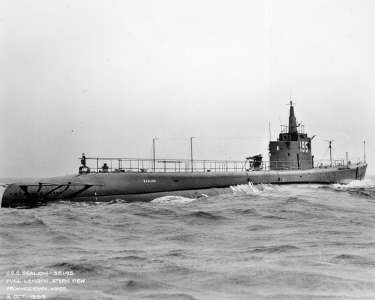
- USS Sealion (SS-195)

History

United States
- Builder: General Dynamics Electric Boat, Groton, Connecticut
- Laid down: 30 June 1938
- Launched: 25 May 1939
- Commissioned: 27 November 1939
- Fate: Scuttled at Cavite on 25 December 1941 after being damaged by Japanese aircraft on 10 December 1941

General characteristics
- Class & type: Sargo-class diesel-electric submarine
- Displacement: 1,450 long tons (1,470 t) standard, surfaced, 2,350 tons (2,388 t) submerged
- Length: 310 ft 6 in (94.64 m)
- Beam: 26 ft 10 in (8.18 m)
- Draft: 16 ft 7 1/2 in (5.067 m)
- Propulsion: 4 × General Motors Model 16-248 V16 diesel engines driving electrical generators, 2 × 126-cell Sargo batteries, 4 × high-speed General Electric electric motors with reduction gears, two shafts, 5,200 shp (4.1 MW) surfaced, 2,740 shp (2.0 MW) submerged
- Speed: 21 kn (39 km/h) surfaced, 8.75 kn (16.21 km/h) submerged
- Range: 11,000 nmi (20,000 km) @ 10 kn (19 km/h)
- Endurance: 48 hours @ 2 kn (3.7 km/h) submerged
- Test depth: 250 ft (76 m)
- Complement: 5 officers, 54 enlisted
- Armament: 8 × 21 inch (533 mm) torpedo tubes (four forward, four aft; 24 torpedoes), 1 × 3 in (76 mm)/50 cal deck gun, four machine guns

USS Sealion (SS-195), a Sargo-class submarine, was the first ship of the United States Navy to be named for the sea lion, any of several large, eared seals native to the Pacific. The first American submarine victim of enemy action in World War II was the USS Sealion

== Construction and commissioning ==
Sealion′s keel was laid down on 20 June 1938 by the Electric Boat Company of Groton, Connecticut. She was launched on 25 May 1939, sponsored by Mrs. Augusta K. Bloch, wife of Admiral Claude C. Bloch, Commander-in-Chief, United States Fleet, and commissioned on 27 November 1939, LT Julian K. Morrison, Jr. in command.

== Service history ==
Following shakedown, Sealion, assigned to Submarine Division 17 (SubDiv 17), prepared for overseas deployment. On February 10, 1940 Sealion was conducting a port visit in St. Petersburg, Florida. That evening the commanding officer, LT J.K. Morrison Jr., was in the wardroom when he was accidentally shot in the upper abdomen by a target pistol he was cleaning. He was immediately transported to the hospital, but died of his injuries the next day. LCDR Richard Voge assumed command. In the spring of 1940, she sailed, with her division for the Philippine Islands, arriving at Cavite in the fall to commence operations as a unit of the Asiatic Fleet. Into October 1941, she ranged from Luzon into the Sulu Archipelago, then, with her sister ship Seadragon, another submarine in SubDiv 202, she prepared for a regular overhaul at the Cavite Navy Yard. By 8 December, her yard period had begun; and, two days later, she took two direct hits in the Japanese air raid which demolished the navy yard.

The first bomb struck the aft end of her conning tower fairwater and detonated outside the hull, destroying the main air induction valved and ventilation intake valve. This blast sent shrapnel flying in all directions, some of which struck Seadragon alongside, killing ENS Samuel H. Hunter, Jr. ENS Hunter was the first submariner casualty of World War II The second bomb struck topside above the aft engine room, penetrating the hull and detonating inside. Four crewmen, working on the electrical controls and the motors for the overhaul, were killed instantly, Sterling Cecil Foster, Melvin Donald O'Connell, Ernest Ephrom Ogilvie, and Vallentyne Lester Paul.

Sealion flooded immediately and settled down by the stern with 40% of her main deck underwater and a 15-degree list to starboard. The destruction of the navy yard made repairs impossible, and she was ordered destroyed. All salvageable equipment was taken off, depth charges were placed inside, and on 25 December, the explosives were set off to prevent her from being made useful to the enemy.

Some of the crew were redistributed to other submarines of the Asiatic Fleet, with Voge taking command of USS Sailfish. Some of the crew were assigned to naval defense regiments being formed from other stranded sailors. They supplemented the Army forces defending the islands. Two Sealion men, MM 1c Howard Firth and SN 1c Harold Gearhart were subsequently captured by the Japanese and died as POW's.

The wrecked Sealion remained where she sank, just off Machina Wharf in shallow water at the Cavite Navy Yard. When the Japanese occupied Manila and Cavite on 03 January 1942, they found the wreck where the USN had left her. They examined the wrecked boat to determine if anything was useful. Then, needing the valuable Machina Wharf for their own use, they raised the sub and moved it across Canacao Bay to a spot just off Sangley Point, dropping it in shallow water. It sat there with upper portions exposed, for the rest of the war and into the post-war period.

In 1959 the U.S. and Filipino forces wanted to expand the docking facilities at Sangley Point but found Sealion's wreck in the way. A salvage effort was started, but it was found that the remains of the four men who had died in the engine room during the original attack were still entombed there. The remains were carefully removed under military protocol with two returned to the U.S. for burial by their families. The other two received a full military honors burial at sea. Upon the completion of the salvage work, the wreck was likely sold for scrap.

== Successor ==
Eli Thomas Reich, who was executive officer and engineer on Sealion when it was sunk, assumed command of the second Sealion (SS-315) in March 1944. Four of the six torpedoes that Sealion II fired to sink the Kongō carried the names Foster, O'Connell, Paul and Ogilvie—the men who had been killed in the bombing of the first Sealion three years earlier.

== In popular culture ==
The sinking of Sealion was incorporated into the plot of the 1959 Cary Grant film Operation Petticoat, where the fictional submarine Sea Tiger, also based at Cavite, suffers a similar fate, although in the film she is re-floated and ordered to Cebu for a complete refit, thereby setting the stage for the film's storyline.

In a graphic short story by Japanese manga artist Yukinobu Hoshino titled El Alamein no Shinden, Sealion stops the German invasion of England, Operation Sealion, after Germans fire on her by accident while the United States was still a neutral country.
