= Japanese destroyer Hamakaze (1940) =

Kagerō-class destroyer

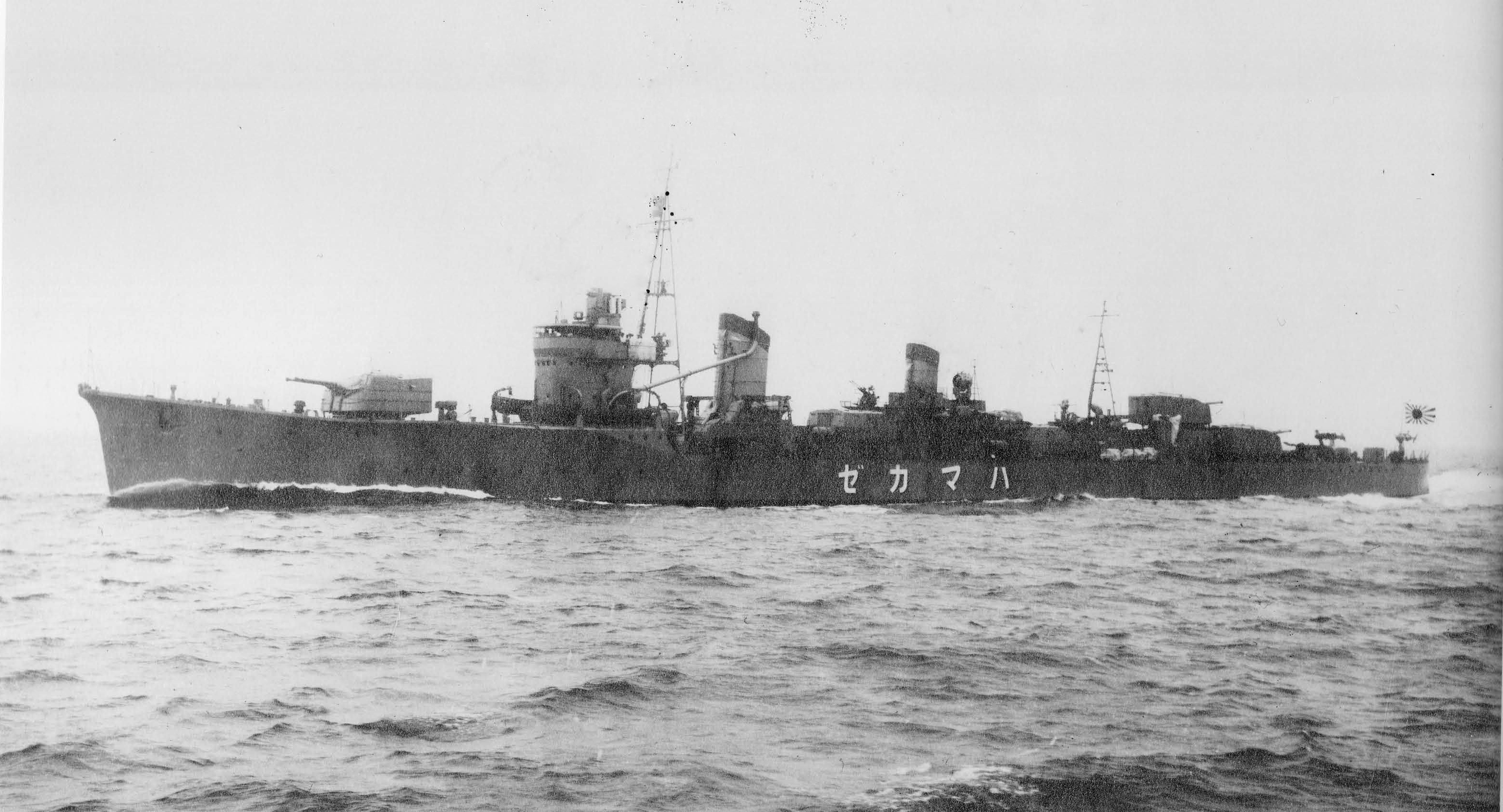
- Hamakaze underway on 30 June 1941

History

Empire of Japan
- Name: Hamakaze
- Ordered: 1937
- Builder: Uraga Dock Company
- Laid down: 20 November 1939
- Launched: 25 November 1940
- Commissioned: 30 June 1941
- Stricken: 10 June 1945
- Fate: Sunk in action, 7 April 1945

General characteristics
- Class & type: Kagerō-class destroyer
- Displacement: 2,490 long tons (2,530 t)
- Length: 118.5 m (388 ft 9 in)
- Beam: 10.8 m (35 ft 5 in)
- Draft: 3.8 m (12 ft 6 in)
- Propulsion: Two-shaft geared turbines
- Speed: 35.5 knots (65.7 km/h; 40.9 mph)
- Range: 5,000 nmi (9,300 km; 5,800 mi)
- Complement: 240
- Armament: 6 × 127 mm (5.0 in)/50 caliber DP guns; up to 28 × Type 96 25 mm (0.98 in) AA guns; up to 4 × 13.2 mm (0.52 in) AA guns; 8 × 610 mm (24 in) torpedo tubes; 36 depth charges

Hamakaze (浜風; "Beach Wind") was one of 19 Kagerō-class destroyers built for the Imperial Japanese Navy during the 1930s.

== Design and description ==
The Kagerō class was an enlarged and improved version of the preceding Asashio class of destroyers. Their crew numbered 240 officers and enlisted men. The ships measured 118.5 meters (388 ft 9 in) overall, with a beam of 10.8 meters (35 ft 5 in) and a draft of 3.76 meters (12 ft 4 in). They displaced 2,065 metric tons (2,032 long tons) at standard load and 2,529 metric tons (2,489 long tons) at deep load. The ships had two Kampon geared steam turbines, each driving one propeller shaft, using steam provided by three Kampon water-tube boilers. The turbines were rated at a total of 52,000 shaft horsepower (39,000 kW) for a designed speed of 35 knots (65 km/h; 40 mph). However, the class proved capable of exceeding 35.5 knots (65.7 km/h; 40.9 mph) on sea trials. The ships were designed with a range of 5,000 nautical miles (9,300 km; 5,800 mi) at a speed of 18 knots (33 km/h; 21 mph). However, the class more accurately proved to have a range of 6,053 nautical miles (11,210 km; 6,966 mi) on trials.

The main armament of the Kagerō class consisted of six Type 3 127-millimeter (5.0 in) guns in three twin-gun turrets, one superfiring pair aft and one turret forward of the superstructure. They were built with four Type 96 25-millimeter (0.98 in) (1.0 in) anti-aircraft guns in two twin-gun mounts, but more of these guns were added over the course of the war. The ships were also armed with eight 610-millimeter (24 in) torpedo tubes for the oxygen-fueled Type 93 "Long Lance" torpedo in two quadruple traversing mounts; one reload was carried for each tube. Their anti-submarine weapons consisted of 16 depth charges.

== Career ==
At the time of Hamakaze's completion, 30 June 1941, she was appointed to join her already completed sister ships Urakaze, Isokaze, and Tanikaze in destroyer division 17, where together they saw a short peacetime career consisting of training duties and revisions to her command structure. However, things changed when from 18–22 November, Hamakaze departed Saeki with the rest of destroyer division 17 for Hitokappu Bay to escort the Kidō Butai aircraft carrier force on a secret mission, a mission which eventually became the surprise attack on Pearl Harbor, which occurred on 7 December. As the force did not come under American counterattack, Hamakaze saw no combat, and returned to Japan on the 24th.

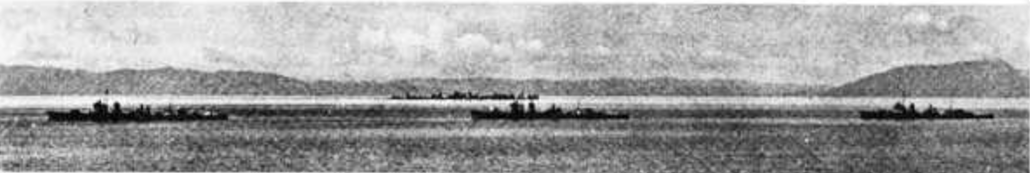
Hamakaze (right), Tanikaze (center), and Isokaze (left) anchored at Saeki in preparation for the Attack on Pearl Harbor, November 1941

Throughout January 1942, Hamakaze escorted the aircraft carriers Akagi and Kaga throughout strikes on Rabaul, and throughout February escorted the carrier fleet during the attack on Port Darwin and failed attempts to track down Allied aircraft carriers, then during the following months Hamakaze escorted the carriers during operations in the Java Sea and the Indian Ocean raid, and escorted the battleships Kongō and Haruna when they, joined by Urakaze and Tanikaze, bombardment Christmas Island and led to a successful capture of the territory. Hamakaze finally arrived back at Kure on 27 April and was docked for repairs. Despite her active service, she had not managed to fire a single shot in combat.

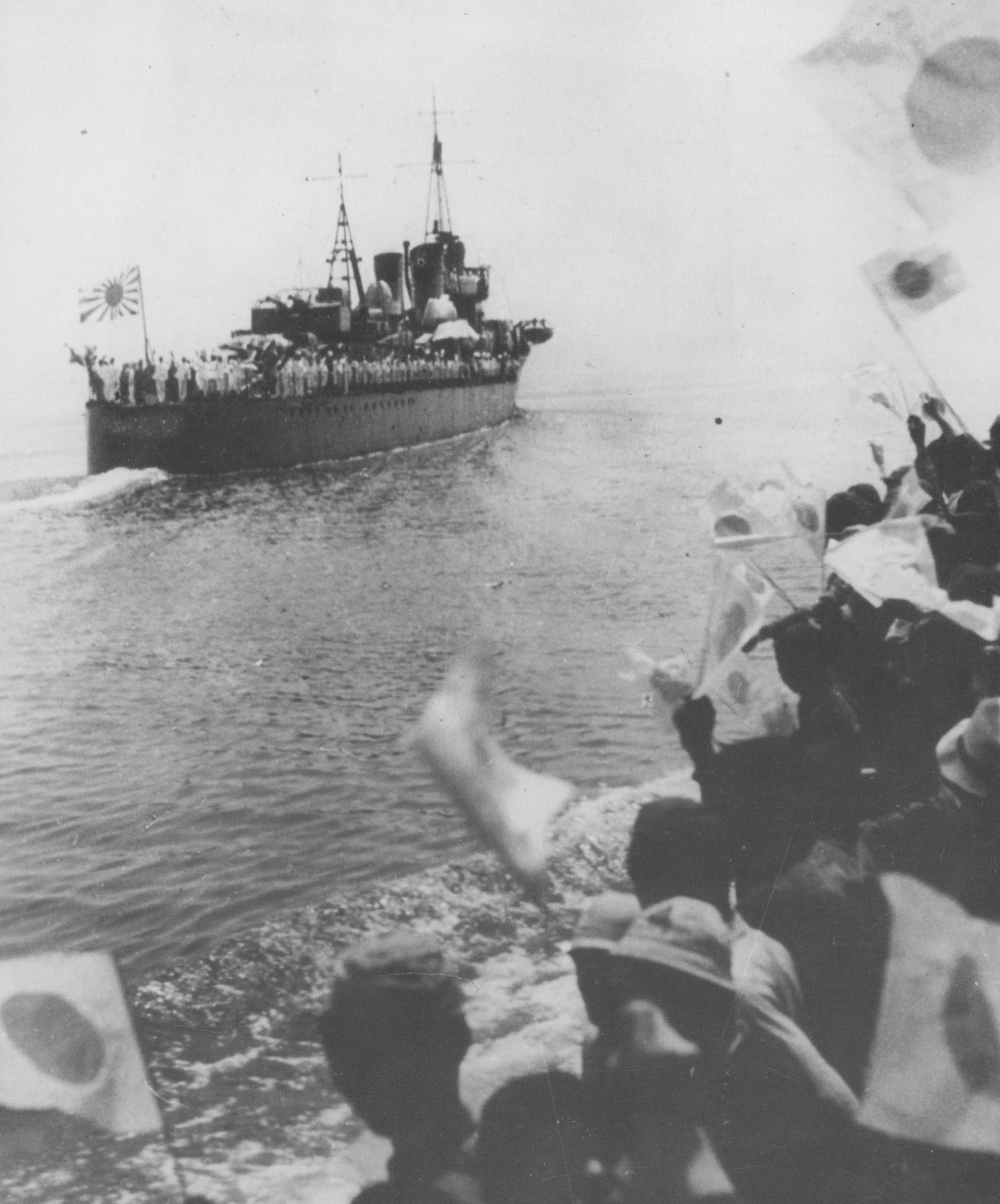
Hamakaze (background) in a still from a Japanese propaganda film Eighty-eight Years of the Sun in June 1941

At the Battle of Midway, Hamakaze again escorted the Japanese aircraft carriers. The plan was for their aircraft to attack and destroy the defenses on Midway Island to lure out American carriers, where hopefully Admiral Nagumo's carriers and Admiral Yamamoto's battleships would catch the aircraft carriers and sink them, simultaneously leading to a successful capture of Midway Island. However, American intelligence had intercepted the plan around a month before it commenced and quickly responded with their own aircraft carriers. For the first time, Hamakaze saw direct combat, firing her guns to fend off American aircraft attacks, although she did not manage to down any aircraft, and in turn US carrier aircraft sank all four Japanese aircraft carriers and a heavy cruiser. Hamakaze near the end of the battle approached the crippled aircraft carrier Sōryū and assisted in evacuating her crew before alongside Isokaze. On the 8th, Hamakaze transferred the Sōryū survivors to the battleship Kirishima, and finally returned to Hashirajima on the 14th.

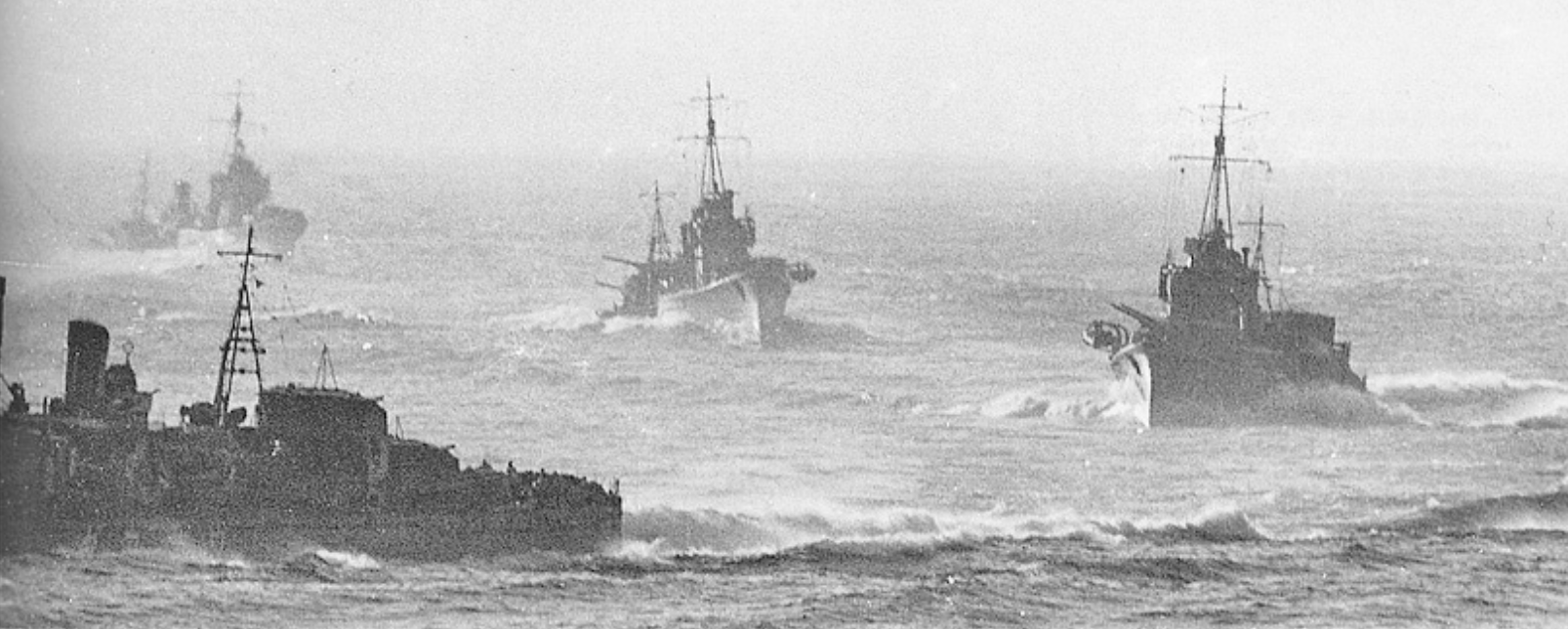
Urakaze leading Isokaze, Tanikaze, and Hamakaze (closest to farthest) during a training exercise in the Bungo Channel, 16 October 1941

After a series of transits between ports, Hamakaze took part on her first troop transport run to Guadalcanal from 8–14 August, a duty which overfilled her career for the following months. The only break from these uneventful tasks was her role as a carrier escort during the battle of Santa Cruz on 26 October, during which her task force came under heavy air attacks, damaging several Japanese ships (but failing to sink any). In turn, Japanese forces sank the aircraft carrier USS Hornet and the destroyer USS Porter and damaged several other American warships, ending the battle in a Japanese victory. Escorting duties rounded out Hamakaze's career for the rest of 1942. At the start of 1943, Hamakaze escorted a large troop convoy from Rabaul to Lae and back. Underway, US aircraft destroyed the troop transports Nichiryu Maru and Myōkō Maru, and in turn Hamakaze was present during the sinking of the submarine USS Argonaut but did not engage. Hamakaze then survived another air raid on 15 January without damage.

At the start of February, Hamakaze took part in the evacuation of Guadalcanal, where she was damaged by a bomb hit from US aircraft that destroyed her forward turret. From 6–16 March the damaged Hamakaze towed the crippled and disabled destroyer Michishio from Truk to mainland Japan without being attacked by enemy forces, and was for her part docked at Kure for repairs afterwards, repairs that lasted until June.

=== Solomon Islands campaign ===
Upon being repaired, Hamakaze departed for additional troop transport runs in support of the Solomon Islands. Particularly, on 5–6 July, Hamakaze served in the troop transport force during the battle of Kula Gulf and watched as other destroyers engaged an Allied cruiser-destroyer force. In the resulting battle, the destroyers Niizuki and Nagatsuki were sunk, but in turn Niizuki torpedoed and sank the destroyer USS Strong while other Japanese forces torpedoed and sank an American light cruiser. Hamakaze successfully assisted in landing 1,600 ground troops, albeit seeing no direct combat herself.

==== Battle of Kolombangara ====
On the 9th, Hamakaze departed as part of a protection force for Japanese destroyer transport run, leading to the 12th when her formation was intercepted by an Allied cruiser-destroyer force, made up of many of the same ships which partook in the Kula Gulf battle. After setting off her searchlights, Hamakaze joined other destroyers in attacking the Allied ships with their torpedo batteries, severely damaging a light cruiser. Hamakaze took about a half hour to reload her torpedoes and swerve back into firing range. Hamakaze and the other destroyers fired a spread of 38 torpedoes, enabling multiple hits to sink the destroyer USS Gwin and damage two cruisers. Completely out of torpedoes, Hamakaze retreated from the area. All the destroyer transports completed their mission unattacked.

==== Battle of Horaniu ====
On 17-18 August, Hamakaze was involved in the battle off Horaniu. She was one of the rare Japanese destroyers to be equipped with radar at this point in the war. She helped defend Japanese troop transports against an American destroyer flotilla, where she was damaged by a single 5-inch (127 mm) shell hit.

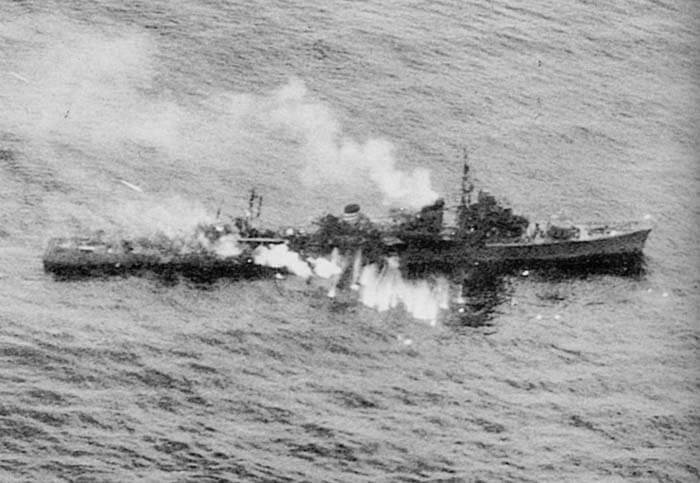
Hamakaze under air attacks during Operation Ten-Go, 7 April 1945

=== Operation Ten Go ===
On 7 April 1945, Hamakaze escorted the battleship Yamato from the Inland Sea on her Operation Ten-Go attack on the Allied forces on Okinawa. She was sunk by aircraft of Task Force 58 primarily from USS San Jacinto and sank 150 miles (240 km) southwest of Nagasaki (30°47′N 128°08′E).
