= Japanese destroyer Urakaze (1940) =

Kagerō-class destroyer

Coordinates: 26°09′N 121°23′E

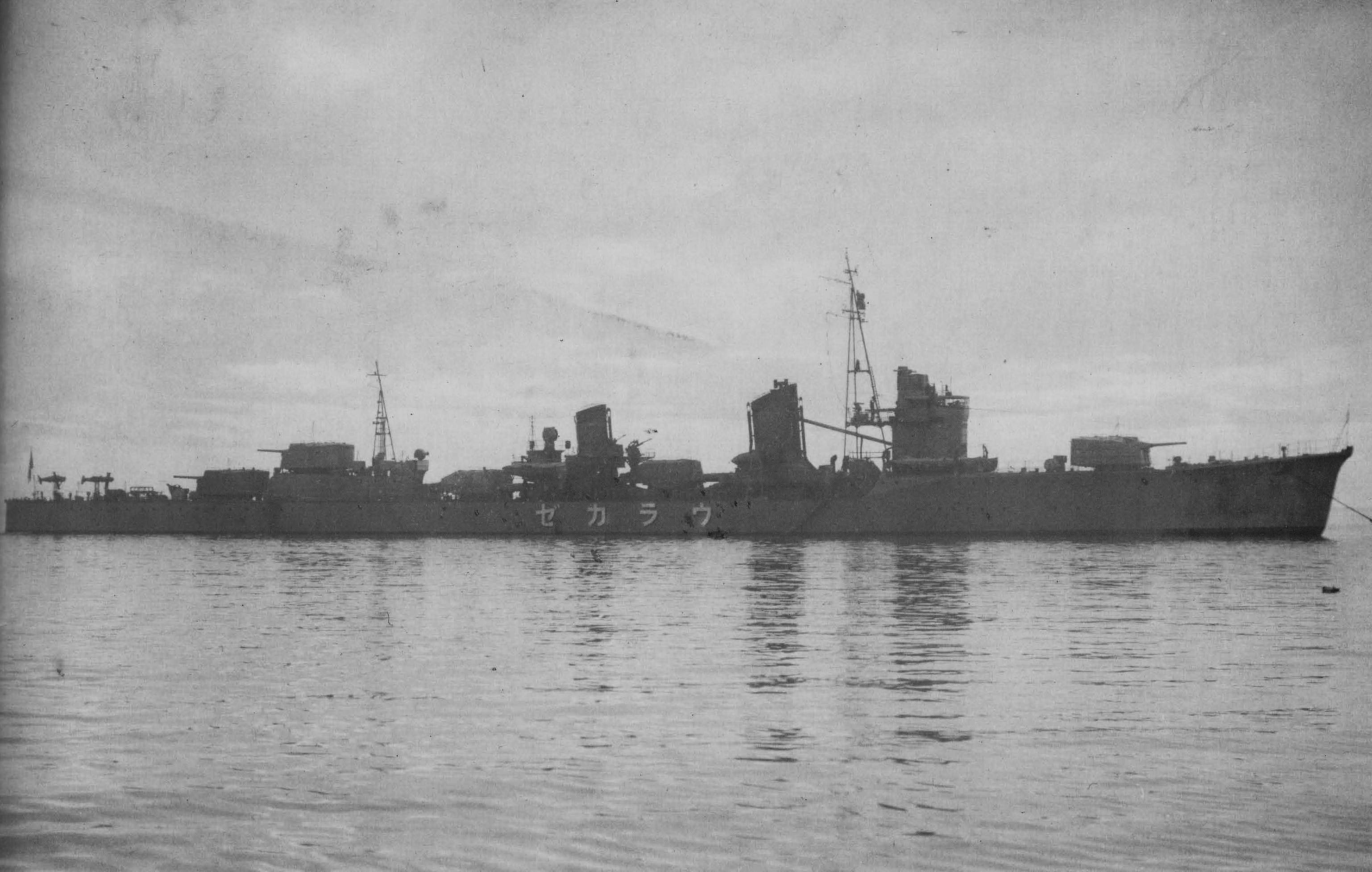
- Urakaze at anchor upon commissioning on 15 December 1940

History

Empire of Japan
- Name: Urakaze
- Ordered: 1937
- Builder: Fujinagata Shipyards, Osaka
- Laid down: 11 April 1939
- Launched: 10 April 1940
- Commissioned: 15 December 1940
- Stricken: 10 January 1945
- Fate: Sunk, 21 November 1944

General characteristics
- Class & type: Kagerō-class destroyer
- Displacement: 2,490 long tons (2,530 t)
- Length: 118.5 m (388 ft 9 in)
- Beam: 10.8 m (35 ft 5 in)
- Draft: 3.8 m (12 ft 6 in)
- Speed: 35 knots (65 km/h; 40 mph)
- Complement: 240
- Armament: 6 × 127 mm (5.0 in)/50 caliber DP guns; up to 28 × Type 96 25 mm (0.98 in) AA guns; up to 4 × 13.2 mm (0.52 in) AA guns; 8 × 610 mm (24 in) torpedo tubes; 36 depth charges

Service record
- Operations: Attack on Pearl Harbor; Battle of Midway; Battle of Santa Cruz; Battle of the Philippine Sea; Battle of Leyte Gulf
- Victories: SS Enggano (1920); USS Johnston (1943)

Urakaze (浦風; "Seashore Wind" or "Seashore Breeze") was one of 19 Kagerō-class destroyers built for the Imperial Japanese Navy during the 1930s-40s.

== Design and construction ==
The Kagerō class was an enlarged and improved version of the preceding Asashio class. Their crew numbered 240 officers and enlisted men. The ships measured 118.5 meters (388 ft 9 in) overall, with a beam of 10.8 meters (35 ft 5 in) and a draft of 3.76 meters (12 ft 4 in). They displaced 2,065 metric tons (2,032 long tons) at standard load and 2,529 metric tons (2,489 long tons) at deep load. The ships had two Kampon geared steam turbines, each driving one propeller shaft, using steam provided by three Kampon water-tube boilers. The turbines were rated at a total of 52,000 shaft horsepower (39,000 kW) for a designed speed of 35 knots (65 km/h; 40 mph). The ships had a range of 5,000 nautical miles (9,300 km; 5,800 mi) at a speed of 18 knots (33 km/h; 21 mph).

The main armament of the Kagerō class consisted of six Type 3 127-millimeter (5.0 in) guns in three twin-gun turrets, one superfiring pair aft and one turret forward of the superstructure. They were built with four Type 96 25-millimeter (1.0 in) anti-aircraft guns in two twin-gun mounts, but more of these guns were added over the course of the war. The ships were also armed with eight 610-millimeter (24.0 in) torpedo tubes for the oxygen-fueled Type 93 "Long Lance" torpedo in two quadruple traversing mounts; one reload was carried for each tube. Their anti-submarine weapons comprised 16 depth charges.

Urakaze was laid down on 11 April 1939, launched on 10 April 1940, and finally commissioned later that December. Upon the start of 1940, Urakaze was appointed as Captain Sugiura Kijū's flagship of destroyer division 17 (Urakaze, Tanikaze, Isokaze, Hamakaze) and embarked on a series of training and patrol duties during the year of peacetime she experienced.

== Second World War ==
On 18 November 1941, Urakaze arrived at Hitokappu Bay for an unknown mission, and on the 22nd departed to escort the Kidō Butai aircraft carrier force. This mysterious mission was actually to escort the carriers to the attack on Pearl Harbor, which was carried out on 7 December. Urakaze then spent the rest of 1941 and into February 1942 escorting the Kidō Butai on various air strikes against targets at Wake Island, Rabaul, and Port Darwin, before escorting them in operations in the Java Sea.

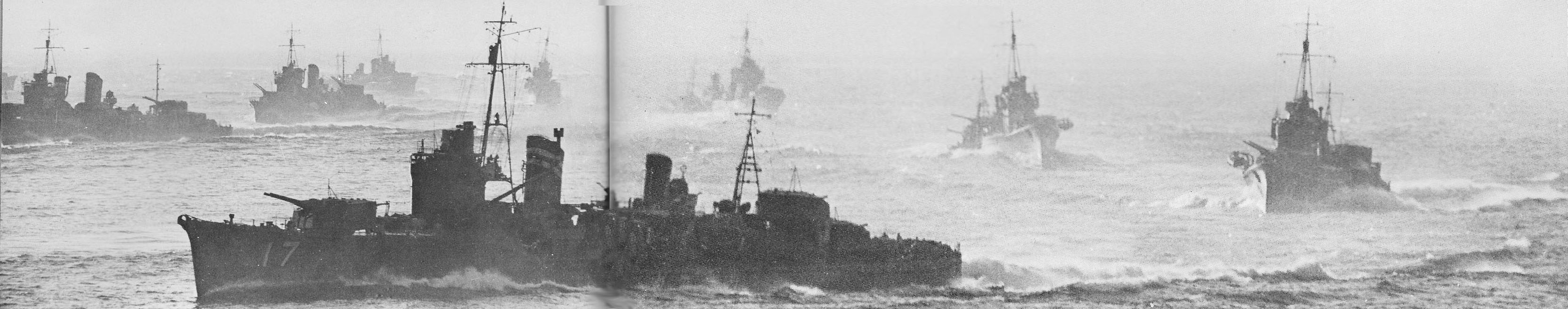
Urakaze on training duty in the Bungo Channel, 16 October 1941. To her right, Isokaze, Tanikaze, and Hamakaze are seen following her, and to her left sail the Shigure, Shiratsuyu, Akatsuki, and Hibiki

On 3 March, Urakaze was detached alongside the heavy cruiser Chikuma to track down the 5,412-ton Dutch freighter Enggano, which had been earlier damaged by a floatplane from the heavy cruiser Takao. On 4 March, Urakaze and Chikuma located Enggano and combined torpedoes to sink the freighter. On 7 March, Urakaze bombarded Christmas Island, before escorting the Kidō Butai during the Indian Ocean Raid, and at the end of April being docked for refit in Kure.

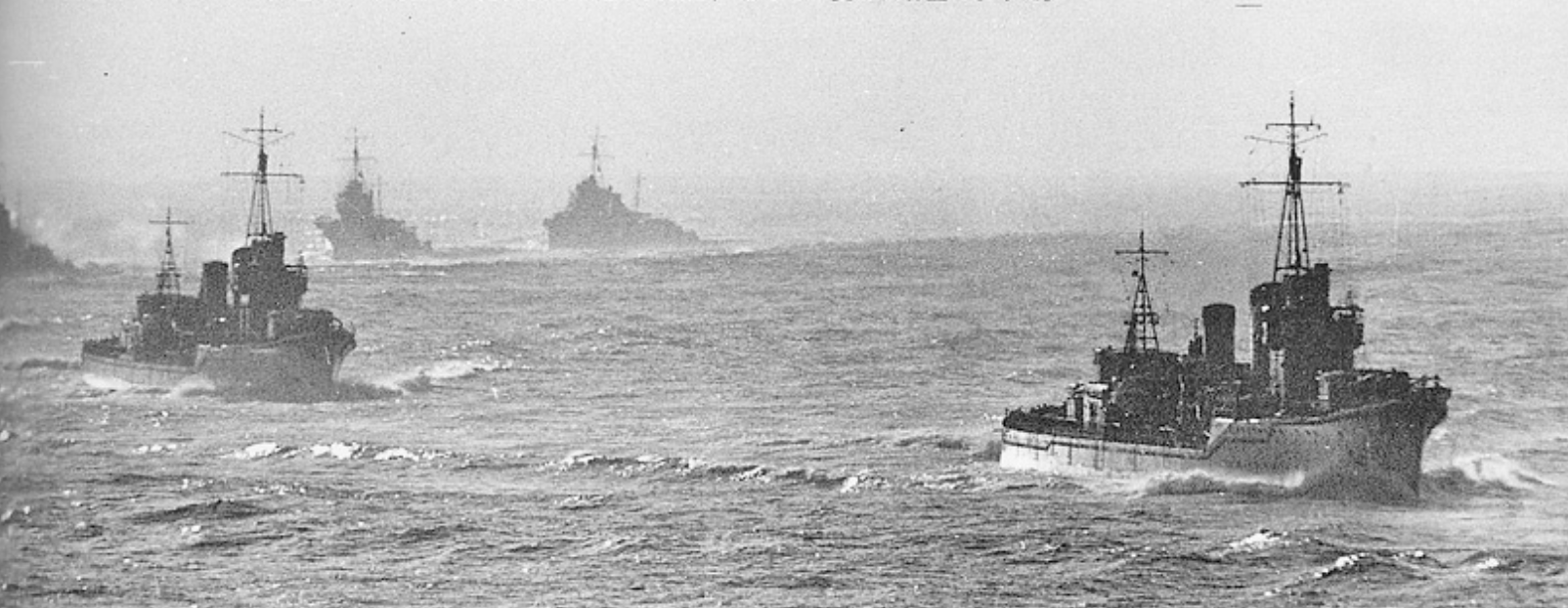
Urakaze leading Tanikaze (desdiv 27 is behind them), 16 October 1941

From 4–5 June, Urakaze escorted aircraft carriers during the battle of Midway, where she witnessed four Japanese aircraft carriers and a heavy cruiser being sunk to American aircraft carrier attacks, then escorted the aircraft carrier Zuikaku from Kure to Ominato from 15–23 June, then from the rest of June into July patrolled outside of Ominato. With the start of the Guadalcanal campaign, Urakaze saw service partaking in troop transport missions to Guadalcanal, and while escorting the Milne invasion force on 25 August she took minor damage from aircraft strafing which killed one man and injured three others. After more transport missions, on 26 October, Urakaze escorted carriers during the battle of Santa Cruz, then took part in supply drum transports to Guadalcanal.

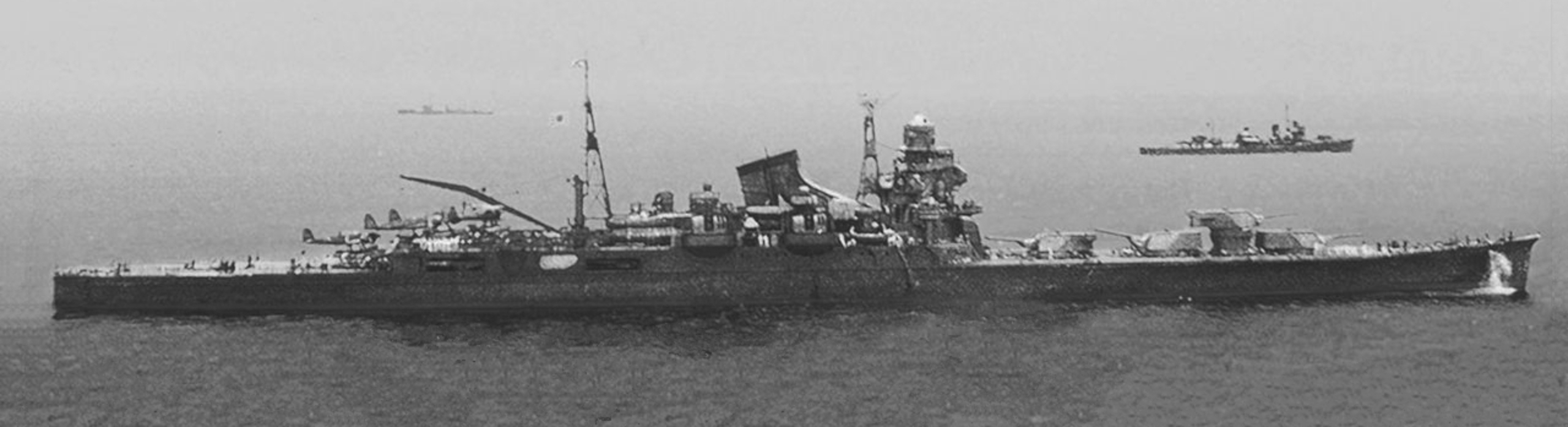
Urakaze anchored behind the heavy cruiser Tone in Hashirajima, 27 May 1942

On Christmas day 1943, Urakaze assisted the damaged destroyer Uzuki and the transport ship Nankai Maru, then saw more troop transport and convoy escorting missions during the final months of the Guadalcanal campaign, and at the start of February 1943 took part in the evacuation of Guadalcanal, then assisted the damaged destroyer Harusame. Urakaze then engaged in several convoy escorting missions between Japanese occupied Islands, and from 18–25 September escorted the combined fleet to counterattack US carrier raids but saw no combat, then escorted a troop convoy to Kavieng. On 11 November, Urakaze took minor strafing damage during an air raid on Rabaul, then escorted the crippled light cruiser Agano to Truk. After rescuing survivors from the sunken escort carrier Chūyō, she was docked for repairs in Kure, where her X turret was removed and replaced with anti-aircraft guns, with repairs finished on 5 December.

Throughout January 1944, Urakaze took part in convoy escorting duties, and in February she escorted combined fleet between Truk, Palau, and Lingga. More convey escorting ensued, and in June she rescued survivors from the destroyers Hayanami and Tanikaze on patrol duties. On 18–19 June, Urakaze escorted carriers during the Battle of Philippine Sea, she assisted survivors of the aircraft carrier Shōkaku, which was sunk by the submarine USS Cavalla, and slightly damaged the attacking submarine with depth charges. At the end of July, Urakaze took part in a troop transport mission to Okinawa, then escorted the battleships Fusō and Yamashiro to Lingga from 22 September to 4 October, then escorted combined fleet to Brunai on the 20th.

=== Battle of Leyte Gulf ===
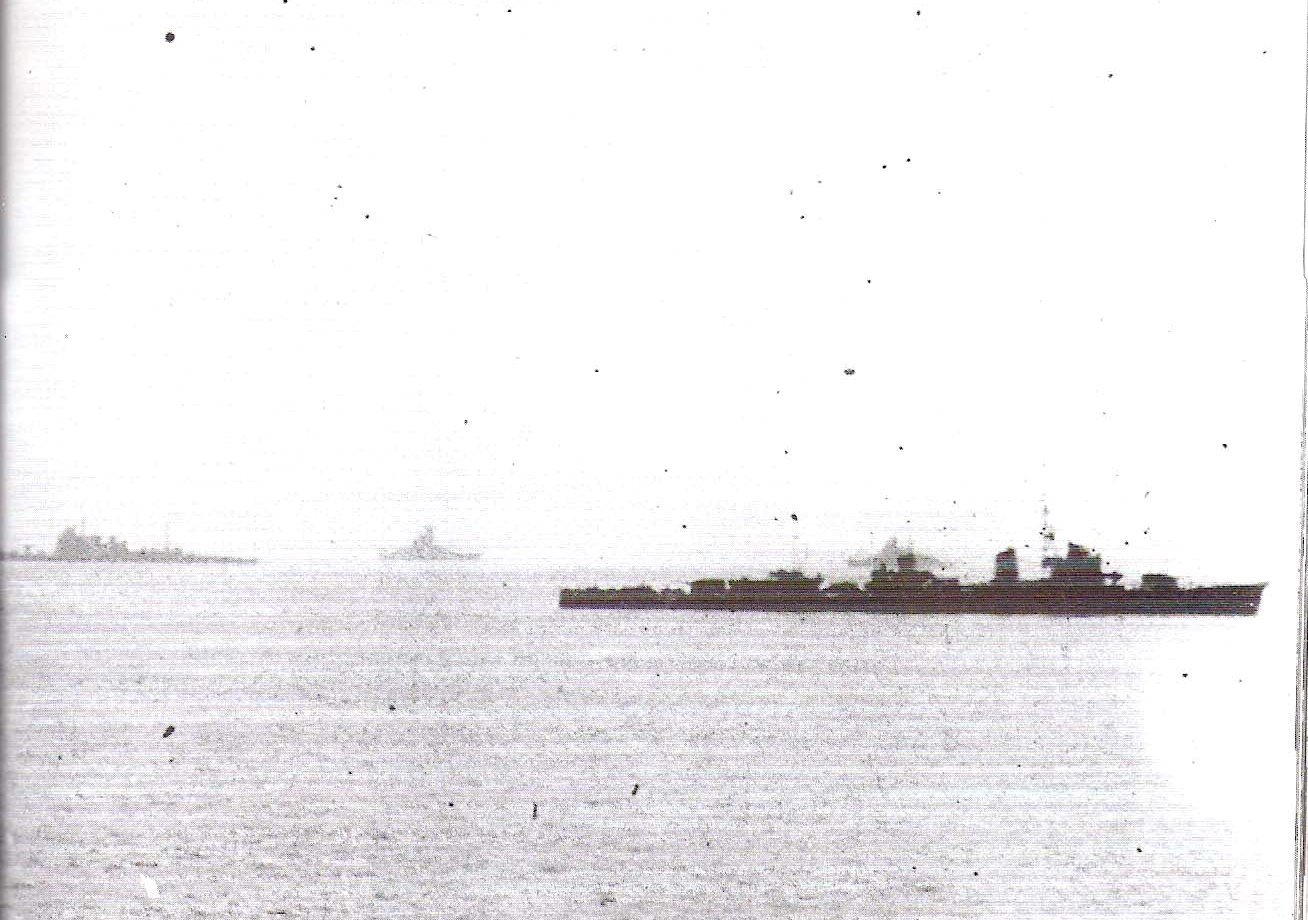
Urakaze anchored off Brunei shortly before the battle of Leyte Gulf, 21 October 1944

On 22 October, Urakaze departed Brunei as part of Admiral Kurita's center force to take part in the battle of Leyte Gulf. From the 23rd to 24th, Urakaze survived the submarine and air attacks that sank and damaged numerous Japanese warships with only minor damage from strafing runs. The next day, Urakaze encountered Taffy 3, a force of six US escort carriers, three destroyers, and four destroyer escorts. Urakaze operated in a destroyer line that consisted of herself, Yukikaze, Isokaze, and Nowaki led by the light cruiser Yahagi. Together, they took part in a torpedo attack on US escort carriers that failed to score any hits, then engaged the crippled destroyer USS Johnston, with the resulting shell hits helping to disable her remaining guns and engines, set her on fire, and deliver the coup de grace that sank the destroyer over the course of an hour. Air and surface attacks sank three heavy cruisers and caused Kurita to lose his nerve and retreat from the battle. On the 26th, air attacks sank a light cruiser and several destroyers, but Urakaze managed to return to Brunei on the 28th.

=== Sinking ===
With the invasion of the Philippines by Allied forces becoming increasingly successful, it was time for the Japanese fleet to retreat back to mainland Japan, with Urakaze departing on 16 November alongside the rest of combined fleet. Three days later, Urakaze was still underway when the fleet was detected by the submarine USS Sealion, which fired six torpedoes, three of which hit their intended target and sank the battleship Kongō. Sealion then fired three more torpedoes. They missed their intended target, the battleship Nagato, but one of these torpedoes hit Urakaze. She immediately exploded and sank with all hands, including Commander Destroyer Division 17, Captain Tamotsu Tanii.
