= USS Sealion (SS-315) =

Balao-class US Navy submarine (1944 to 1970)

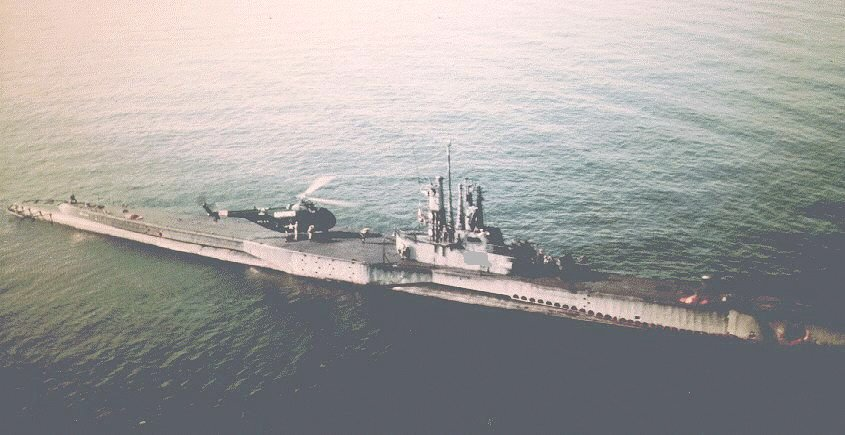
- Sealion (APSS-315), converted to an amphibious transport submarine (May 1956)

History

United States
- Builder: General Dynamics Electric Boat, Groton, Connecticut
- Laid down: 25 February 1943
- Launched: 31 October 1943
- Commissioned: 8 March 1944
- Decommissioned: 16 February 1946
- Recommissioned: 2 November 1948
- Decommissioned: 30 June 1960
- Recommissioned: 20 October 1961
- Decommissioned: 20 February 1970
- Stricken: 15 March 1977
- Fate: Sunk as a target off Newport on 8 July 1978

General characteristics
- Class & type: Balao-class diesel-electric submarine
- Displacement: 1,526 long tons (1,550 t) surfaced, 2,424 long tons (2,463 t) submerged
- Length: 311 ft 9 in (95.02 m)
- Beam: 27 ft 3 in (8.31 m)
- Draft: 16 ft 10 in (5.13 m) maximum
- Propulsion: 4 × General Motors Model 16-278A V16 diesel engines driving electrical generators; 2 × 126-cell Sargo batteries; 4 × high-speed General Electric electric motors with reduction gears; 2 × propellers; 5,400 shp (4.0 MW) surfaced; 2,740 shp (2.0 MW) submerged
- Speed: 20.25 knots (37.50 km/h; 23.30 mph) surfaced, 8.75 knots (16.21 km/h) submerged
- Range: 11,000 nmi (20,000 km; 13,000 mi) at 10 knots (19 km/h; 12 mph) surfaced
- Endurance: 48 hours at 2 kn (3.7 km/h; 2.3 mph) submerged, 75 days on patrol
- Test depth: 400 ft (120 m)
- Complement: 10 officers, 70–71 enlisted
- Armament: 10 × 21-inch (533 mm) torpedo tubes; 6 forward, 4 aft; 24 torpedoes; 1 × 5-inch (127 mm) / 25 caliber deck gun; Bofors 40 mm and Oerlikon 20 mm cannon

USS Sealion (SS/SSP/ASSP/APSS/LPSS-315), a Balao-class submarine, was the second ship of the United States Navy to be named for the sea lion, any of several large, eared seals native to the Pacific. She is sometimes referred to as Sealion II, because her first skipper, Lieutenant Commander Eli Thomas Reich, was a veteran of the first Sealion (SS-195), serving on her when she was lost at the beginning of World War II. Sealion was the only US and Allied submarine that sank an enemy battleship during the Second World War.

Her keel was laid down on 25 February 1943 by the Electric Boat Company of Groton, Connecticut. She was launched on 31 October 1943 sponsored by Mrs. Emory S. Land, and commissioned on 8 March 1944.

== World War II ==
Following the shakedown, Sealion, assigned to Submarine Division 222 (SubDiv 222), sailed for the Pacific and arrived at Pearl Harbor on 17 May 1944. Further training occupied the next three weeks, and on 8 June, she headed west on her first war patrol. Sailing with Tang, she stopped off at Midway Atoll on 12 June, glanced off a whale on 15 June, and on 22 June, transited Tokara Strait to enter the East China Sea. On 23 June, she and Tang took up stations in the Ōsumi Islands, an island group to the south of Kyūshū. That afternoon, Sealion unsuccessfully conducted her first attack, then underwent her first depth charging. On 24 June, Tinosa joined the two submarines; and the group moved northward to patrol the approaches to Sasebo. Patrolling in adjacent lanes, the submarines contacted a convoy on 25 June, but Sealion lost depth control on reaching attack position and was unable to fire.

From the Sasebo area, the submarines moved toward the Korean peninsula. On 28 June, Sealion caught and sank a Japanese naval transport, Sansei Maru, in the Tsushima Island area; then continued on into the Korean archipelago. On 30 June, she used her deck guns to sink a sampan, and, with the new month, July, she moved closer to the China coast to patrol the approaches to Shanghai. On the morning of 6 July, Sealion intercepted a convoy south of the Four Sisters Islands and, at 04:47 commenced firing torpedoes at two merchant ships in the formation. Within minutes, Setsuzan Maru sank, and the convoy scattered. Sealion retired to the northeast to evade the convoy's escort, a destroyer, as it began its search for the submarine. At 06:00, the destroyer closed Sealion, and the submarine launched four torpedoes at the warship. All missed. An hour later enemy aircraft joined the search which was continued until mid-afternoon, and Sealion escaped unscathed.

Three days later, Sealion moved northward again and commenced hunting between the Shandong peninsula and Korea. Dense fog blanketed the area and left her blind while her radar was out of commission. By midnight on the night of 10–11 July, however, her radar was back in partial operation; and, on the morning of 11 July, she conducted several attacks, sinking two freighters, Tsukushi Maru Number 2 and Taian Maru Number 2. The running surface chase with the second freighter involved three attacks over a period of almost seven hours. On the third attack, at 07:11, Sealion fired her last torpedo; then, after debris from the explosion had flown over the submarine, she moved down the port quarter of the target, pouring 20 mm shells into the Japanese bridge. At 07:14, the freighter disappeared, and Sealion headed south of Tokara Strait. On 13 July, she cleared that strait and, on 21 July, she arrived at Midway Island.

Refitted by Fulton, Sealion departed for the Bashi Channel on her second war patrol on 17 August. Hunting with Growler and Pampanito, she transited the channel and moved into the South China Sea on 30 August. During the pre-dawn hours of 31 August, she conducted a night surface attack against a Japanese convoy and heavily damaged a tanker. As Rikko Maru billowed black smoke, other Japanese ships took Sealion under fire with deck guns. The submarine moved out of the area and executed an end-around to take position ahead of the convoy. At 07:20, she again attacked the convoy. Within minutes, Shirataka went down; enemy planes began circling the area and the convoy's surface escorts began their search. Sealion went deep and headed south. Later that day, she closed another target with a merchant ship appearance, but as she reached firing position, the target was made out to be an antisubmarine vessel. Three torpedoes were fired, but were spotted by the target's bow lookout. The target evaded the torpedoes and the hunter became the hunted. Depth charging followed without damage to the submarine; but Sealion, low on fuel and torpedoes, headed for Saipan.

There, the submarine rearmed and refueled. On 7 September, Sealion got underway to rejoin her attack group. On 10 September, she moved through Balintang Channel. On 11 September, she rendezvoused with two other submarines, and on 12 September, the group attacked and decimated a convoy en route to Formosa. This was achieved through American code breakers deciphering a coded message. The convoy carried Australian and British prisoners of war (POWs) from the infamous Thai Burma Railway. At about 02:00, Growler attacked the formation. Pampanito and Sealion followed suit. Growler's torpedoes sent the destroyer Shikinami to the bottom. Sealion launched two torpedoes, both misses, and was taken under fire by two of the escorts. The submarine went to top speed and managed to keep ahead of the escorts until they broke off to rejoin the convoy shortly before 03:30.

An hour and a half later, Sealion again closed the convoy. At 05:22, she launched three torpedoes at a tanker; then swung to fire on Rakuyo Maru, the last ship in the nearer column. At 05:24, Zuihō Maru, possibly hit by torpedoes from both Pampanito and Sealion, burst into flames. Kachidoki Maru was disabled. She swung into the burning tanker and soon was also ablaze. Sealion's second target was illuminated, and at 05:25, she fired on Rakuyo Maru. Both torpedoes hit and that ship began to burn. The sinking of Rakuyo Maru and Kachidoki Maru resulted in the death of nearly 1,200 Australian and British POWs. Sealion was then forced to go deep. After several attempts to get a better look at the scene, she cleared the area and started after the remainder of the convoy.

On the morning of 15 September, the three submarines reformed their scouting line. That afternoon, Pampanito radioed Sealion and other submarines in the area, to return to the scene of the action on 12 September. Rakuyo Maru had been carrying Australian and British POWs, 1,159 of whom were killed in the attack or by the effects of the attack. By 20:45, Sealion had taken on 54 POWs and started back to Saipan. All of the POWs were coated with crude oil and all were in poor health suffering from malaria, malnutritional diseases such as pellagra and beriberi, and exposure. Three died before the submarine reached Balintang Channel on 17 September. On 18 September, Case rendezvoused with Sealion and transferred a doctor and a pharmacist's mate to the submarine. On 19 September, a fourth POW died, and on 20 September, Sealion arrived in Tanapag Harbor and transferred the surviving 50 rescued POWs to the United States Army hospital there.

From Saipan, Sealion returned to Hawaii. Arriving at Pearl Harbor on 30 September, she departed again on 31 October, and with Kete, headed west to patrol in the East China Sea. The two submarines stopped off at Midway Island on 4 November, then continued on to their patrol area. Ten days later, Sealion transited Tokara Strait. On 16 November, her number 8 tube was accidentally fired with both doors closed. Heavy seas prevented a thorough inspection of the damage. On 17 November, she began patrolling the approaches to Shanghai. On 18 November, there was a hydrogen explosion in the battery space of the torpedo in number 5 tube.

=== Sinking of Kongō and Urakaze ===
At 00:20 on 21 November, she made radar contact with an enemy formation moving through the Taiwan Strait at about 16 knots (30 km/h; 18 mph) and not zig-zagging. By 00:48, the pips were made out to be two cruisers and two battleships. At 01:46, three additional ships, escorts—one on either beam of the formation and one on the starboard quarter—became visible. Sealion had in fact intercepted a powerful surface fleet consisting of the battleships Yamato, Nagato, and Kongō, the cruiser Yahagi, and the destroyers Hamakaze, Isokaze, Urakaze, Yukikaze, Kiri, and Ume.

At 02:45, Sealion, ahead of the task force, turned in and slowed for the attack. Eleven minutes later, she fired six torpedoes at the second ship in line, Kongō. At 02:59, she fired three at Nagato. At 03:00, her crew saw and heard three hits from the first salvo, flooding two of Kongō's boiler rooms and giving her a list to port. Nagato, alerted by the explosions, turned hard and the Sealion's second salvo missed ahead, running on to hit and sink Urakaze; the destroyer's magazines were hit by the torpedo. She blew up and sank quickly with the loss of all hands on board, including the commanding officer of DesDiv 17, Yokota Yasuteru.

Sealion opened to the westward. The Japanese searched to the east. By 03:10, the submarine had reloaded and began tracking again with the thought that the torpedoes had only dented the battleship's armor belt. The Japanese formation, however, had begun zig-zagging and the sea and wind had increased. At 04:50, the enemy formation split into two groups. Sealion began tracking the slower group consisting of Kongō, Isokaze and Hamakaze, performing an end around to regain attack position. At 05:24, a tremendous explosion lit the area and Kongō disappeared.

It was customary in American submarines to mark a name on the head of each torpedo as it was loaded into the tube nest. They usually bore the names of the torpedo crews' wives or best girls. Some carried the names of the factory employee who had sold the most war bonds during a given period. That night, however, four of Sealion's torpedoes, as they raced out of their tubes, carried the names Foster, O'Connell, Paul and Ogilvie—the men who had been killed in the bombing of Sealion I three years earlier. It was not customary for the crews of American submarines to make audio recordings of their attacks. However, the Sealion crew had obtained a sound recorder left behind by a CBS war correspondent who had debarked at Midway, and when ordered to battle stations after encountering the Japanese battle group, one sailor positioned the microphone by an intercom in the conning tower. That recording, along with a similar recording of an attack on a Japanese oiler during the Sealion's fifth patrol, were then preserved by the Naval Underwater Sound Laboratory, and are thought to be the only surviving sound recordings of World War II submarine attacks.

=== Subsequent activity ===
During the next few days, Sealion continued to patrol between Mainland China and Formosa, and on 28 November, she headed for Guam.

On her fourth war patrol, from 14 December 1944 – 24 January 1945, Sealion returned to the South China Sea in a coordinated attack group with sister ships Blenny and Caiman. Poor weather plagued her, and of the 26 days spent on station, all but six were spent on the surface. On 20 December, she sighted a supply ship escorted by a destroyer through her high periscope, and at 19:37 fired six torpedoes at the supply ship for four hits. The submarine then evaded the escort, reloaded, and waited. Two and one-half hours later, Mamiya was still afloat, and the submarine went in for a second attack. At 00:32 on 21 December, she launched three torpedoes for two hits. The supply ship went under.

That day, Sealion joined the Seventh Fleet, and from 28 December 1944 to 14 January 1945, she performed reconnaissance duties in support of the reoccupation of the Philippine Islands. On the latter date, she cleared her patrol area and headed for Western Australia, arriving at Fremantle on 24 January. She departed Fremantle on her fifth war patrol on 19 February. Again operating in a coordinated attack group, she returned to the South China Sea, then proceeded into the Gulf of Siam. In the predawn darkness of 17 March, she torpedoed and sank Samui, and on 2 April, she rescued an Army aviator who had been drifting in a rubber raft for 23 days. That same day, three more downed aviators were transferred to her from Guavina, and on 6 April, she delivered her passengers to Subic Bay.

By 30 April, Sealion was again ready for sea. With Bashaw and Hammerhead, she departed Subic Bay for the northern part of the South China Sea. Through May, she patrolled off Hong Kong and provided lifeguard services for strikes against Formosa. At the end of the month, she received downed aviators from Bream and transported them back to Subic, then with passengers bound for Hawaii, she sailed east. On 12 June, she arrived at Guam, whence she proceeded to a lifeguard station off Wake Island, and on 30 June, she cleared that area for Pearl Harbor.

== Post-war ==
From Pearl Harbor, Sealion continued on to San Francisco, California, where she was undergoing overhaul at the end of the war. With the cessation of hostilities, inactivation preparations were added to the overhaul, and on 2 February 1946, the submarine, which had been awarded the Presidential Unit Citation for her six war patrols, was decommissioned.

A year and one-half later, however, Sealion, along with Perch, was designated for conversion to a troop carrier, and in April 1948, she entered the San Francisco Naval Shipyard for the eight-months conversion under project SCB 30. During that period, her torpedo tubes and forward engines were removed, and her forward engine room and forward and after torpedo rooms were converted to berth 123 troops. The forward engine room and after torpedo room were designed for alternative use as cargo space. The wardroom was redesigned for use as an operating room; the beam aft of the conning tower was extended, and a large watertight cylindrical chamber was installed abaft the conning tower to store amphibious landing equipment—including a tracked landing vehicle (LVT).

On 2 November 1948, Sealion was recommissioned a Submarine, Transport, with the hull classification symbol SSP-315. Training exercises off the southern California coast, with Marines embarked, took her into the spring of 1949 when she was ordered to the Atlantic for duty in SubDiv 21. During April, she operated in the New London, Connecticut, area, then, in May, she commenced operations out of Norfolk, Virginia, as a unit of Submarine Squadron 6 (SubRon 6), SubDiv 61. On 31 January 1950, she was reclassified a transport submarine with hull classification symbol ASSP-315; and, by the spring of that year, had conducted exercises as far north as Labrador and as far south as the southern Caribbean. From April to June 1950, she underwent her first post-conversion overhaul at Portsmouth Naval Shipyard, and in July, she resumed operations out of Norfolk.

Sealion was reassigned to SubDiv 63 in March 1955 and tested helicopter operations in 1956. It was reclassified submarine transport APSS-315 on 24 October 1956, Sealion continued a schedule of exercises with Marines, Underwater Demolition Teams and Beach Jumper units and, on occasion, Army units, off the Virginia and Carolina coasts and in the Caribbean until 1960. During that time, interruptions came only for overhaul periods, during one of which the "LVT hangar" abaft the conning tower was removed, and for one deployment with the Sixth Fleet in the Mediterranean from August–November 1957.

On 30 June 1960, Sealion was decommissioned at Portsmouth, New Hampshire, where she remained as a reserve training submarine until reactivated a year later. In August 1961, she was towed to Philadelphia, Pennsylvania for overhaul; on 20 October, she was recommissioned, and on 18 December, she rejoined SubRon 6 at Norfolk. There, she resumed a schedule similar to that of the 1950s, interrupted by regular overhauls, and in the fall of 1962, to support the blockade put into effect during the Cuban Missile Crisis. On 22 October 1962, she departed Norfolk on what was to be a month-long training cruise in the Caribbean, but the formation of the blockade force altered the cruise plans. On 3 December, she returned to Norfolk and from then into 1967 she maintained her schedule of exercises with Marine Reconnaissance, Underwater Demolition Teams, and SEAL personnel. On 15 September 1967, she changed homeports and administrative control, and for the next two years, she operated out of Key West, Florida, as a unit of SubDiv 121. Reclassified an amphibious transport submarine with hull classification symbol LPSS-315 in January 1969, Sealion was ordered inactivated the following summer, and, in September, she proceeded to Philadelphia, Pennsylvania, where she was decommissioned and placed in the inactive fleet on 20 February 1970.

Stricken from the Naval Vessel Register on 15 March 1977, Sealion was sunk as a target off Newport, Rhode Island, on 8 July 1978.

== Awards ==
- Presidential Unit Citation
- Asiatic-Pacific Campaign Medal with five battle stars
- World War II Victory Medal
- National Defense Service Medal with star

== Sources ==
- This article incorporates text from the public domain Dictionary of American Naval Fighting Ships. The entries can be found here and here.
- Roberts, Stephen S. "U.S. Navy Ship Design Project Numbers, 1946–1979 ("SCB Numbers)".
- Tully, Anthony P. (1998). Total Eclipse: The Last Battles of the IJN.
