= SS Rakuyō Maru =

Passenger cargo ship

History

Empire of Japan
- Name: Rakuyo Maru
- Owner: Nippon Yusen Kisen Kaisha
- Port of registry: Tokyo
- Builder: Mitsubishi Shipbuilding Company, Nagasaki
- Launched: 26 February 1921
- Fate: Torpedoed and sunk in the Luzon Strait, 12 September 1944

General characteristics
- Tonnage: 9,419 GRT
- Length: 460 ft (140 m)
- Beam: 60 ft (18 m)
- Draught: 40.5 ft (12.3 m)
- Installed power: 1,153 nhp
- Propulsion: Steam turbines, twin screw
- Speed: 16.5 knots (30.6 km/h; 19.0 mph)

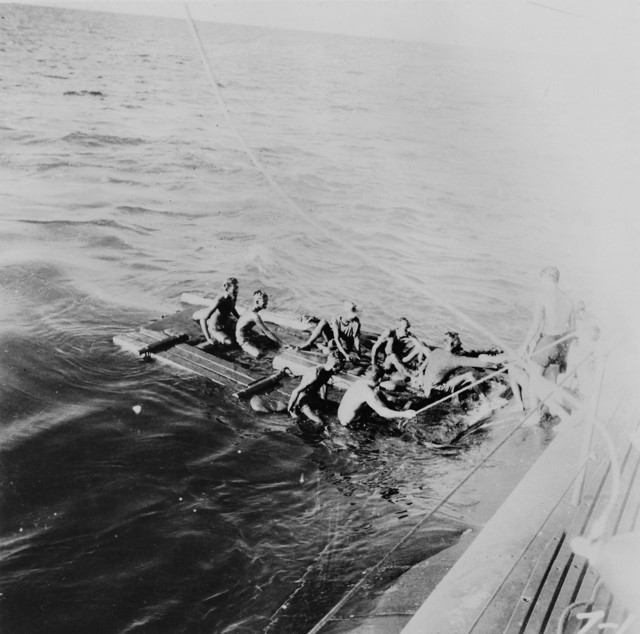
Former British and Australian prisoners of war being rescued by the crew of USS Pampanito

SS Rakuyō Maru (楽洋丸) was a passenger cargo ship built in 1921 by the Mitsubishi Shipbuilding & Engineering Company, Nagasaki for Nippon Yusen Kisen Kaisha. Serving as a troopship in World War II, Rakuyō Maru was torpedoed and sunk by USS Sealion on 12 September 1944.

== Service history ==
The troopship was part of convoy HI-72 and transporting 1,317 Australian and British prisoners of war (POWs) from Singapore to Formosa along with Kachidoki Maru, transporting another 950 Allied POWs and 1,095 Japanese on board.

On the morning of 12 September 1944, the convoy was attacked in the Luzon Strait by a wolfpack consisting of three US submarines: USS Growler, USS Pampanito and USS Sealion. Rakuyō Maru was torpedoed by Sealion and sunk towards the evening. Kachidoki Maru was also sunk with 488 people killed, mostly POWs. The Japanese survivors of Rakuyō Maru were rescued by an escort vessel, leaving the POWs in the water with rafts and some abandoned boats. A total of 1,159 POWs died, including Australian rugby union player Winston Ide and Brigadier Arthur Varley. The dead included 350 POWs who were bombarded in lifeboats and killed by a Japanese navy vessel the next day when they were rowing towards land. On 15 September, the three submarines returned to the area and rescued 149 surviving POWs who were on rafts. Four others died before they could be landed at Tanapag Harbor, Saipan, in the Mariana Islands.
