= Kasatka Bay =

Natural harbor in Iturup, Kuril Islands

- Hitokappu Bay
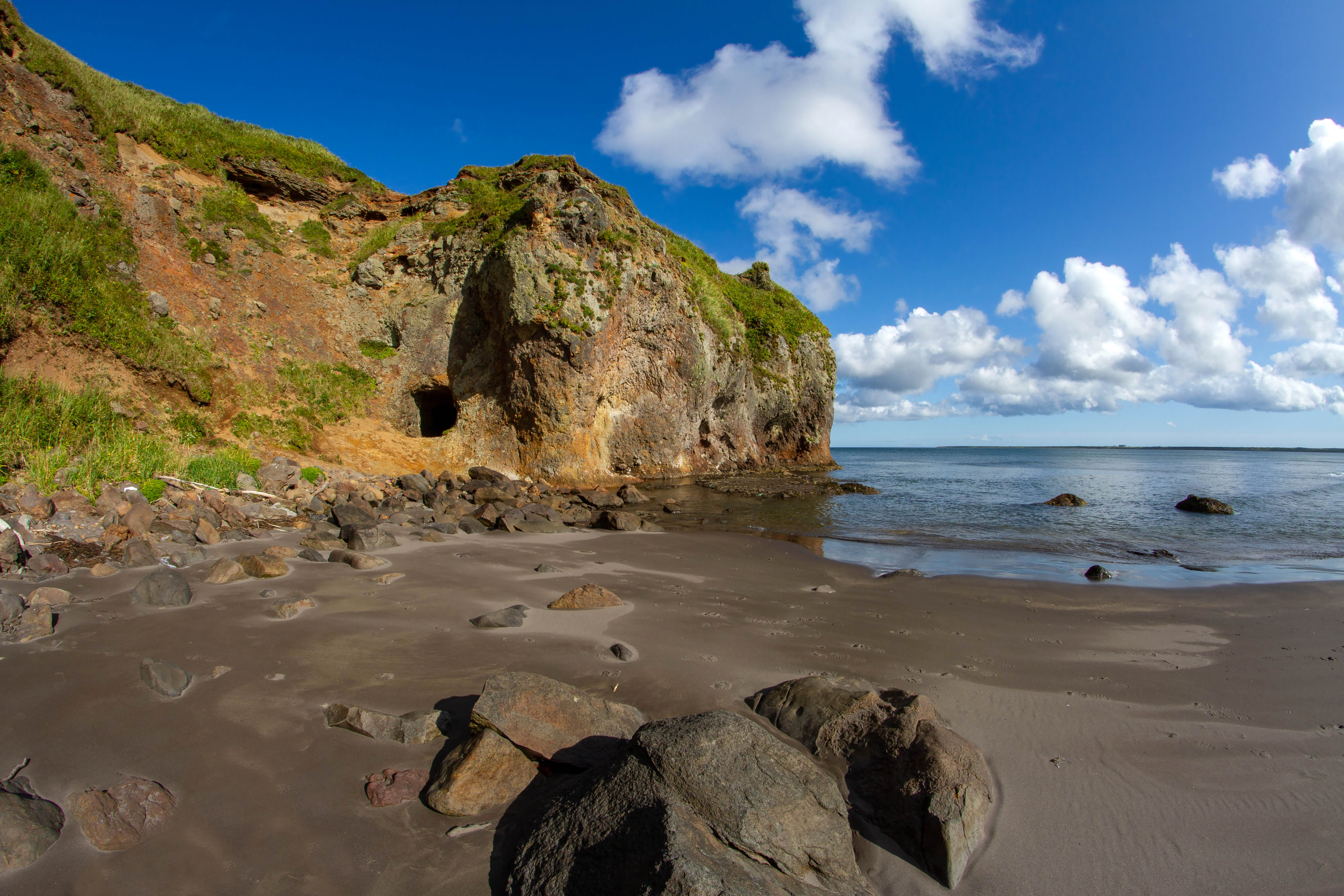
- Kasatka Bay in 2019
- Interactive map of Kasatka Bay
- Coordinates: 44.965°N 147.672°E

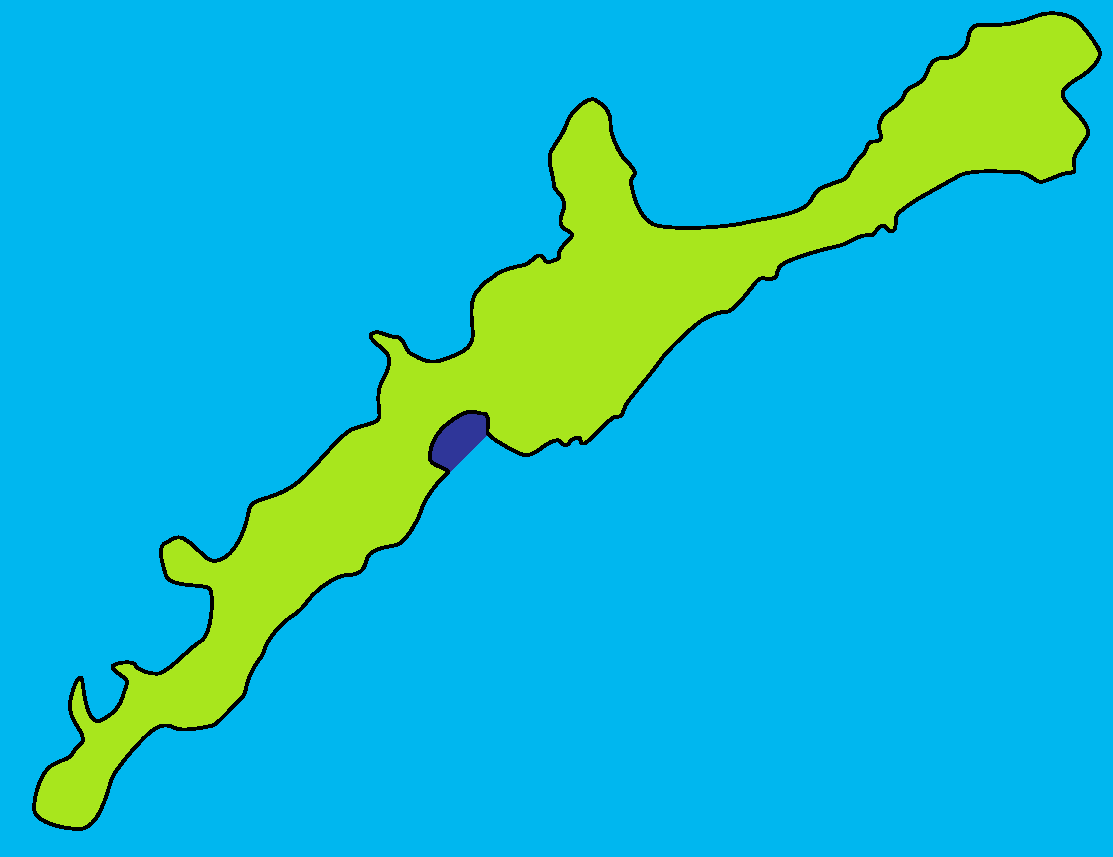
Location of Kasatka Bay (dark blue) in Iturup

Kasatka Bay (Russian: Залив Касатка, romanized: Zaliv Kasatka), formerly known by its Japanese name Hitokappu Bay (Japanese: 単冠湾, Hepburn: Hitokappu Wan), is a natural harbor on the central coast of Iturup, the largest of the Kuril Islands. It has been controlled by the Soviet Union since the Soviets annexed the Kuril Islands from Japan at the end of World War II, and is currently under the administration of the Russian Federation after the collapse of the Soviet Union.

On 26 November 1941, the Japanese Imperial Navy led 24 vessels with the six aircraft carriers from Hitokappu Bay towards Pearl Harbor, Hawaii to trigger the attack on Pearl Harbor on 7 December, which led the United States declaration of war upon Japan.

== See also ==
- Staging area
- Soviet Pacific Fleet
