= December 1941 =

Month of 1941

<<	December 1941					>>
Su	Mo	Tu	We	Th	Fr	Sa
	1	2	3	4	5	6
7	8	9	10	11	12	13
14	15	16	17	18	19	20
21	22	23	24	25	26	27
28	29	30	31

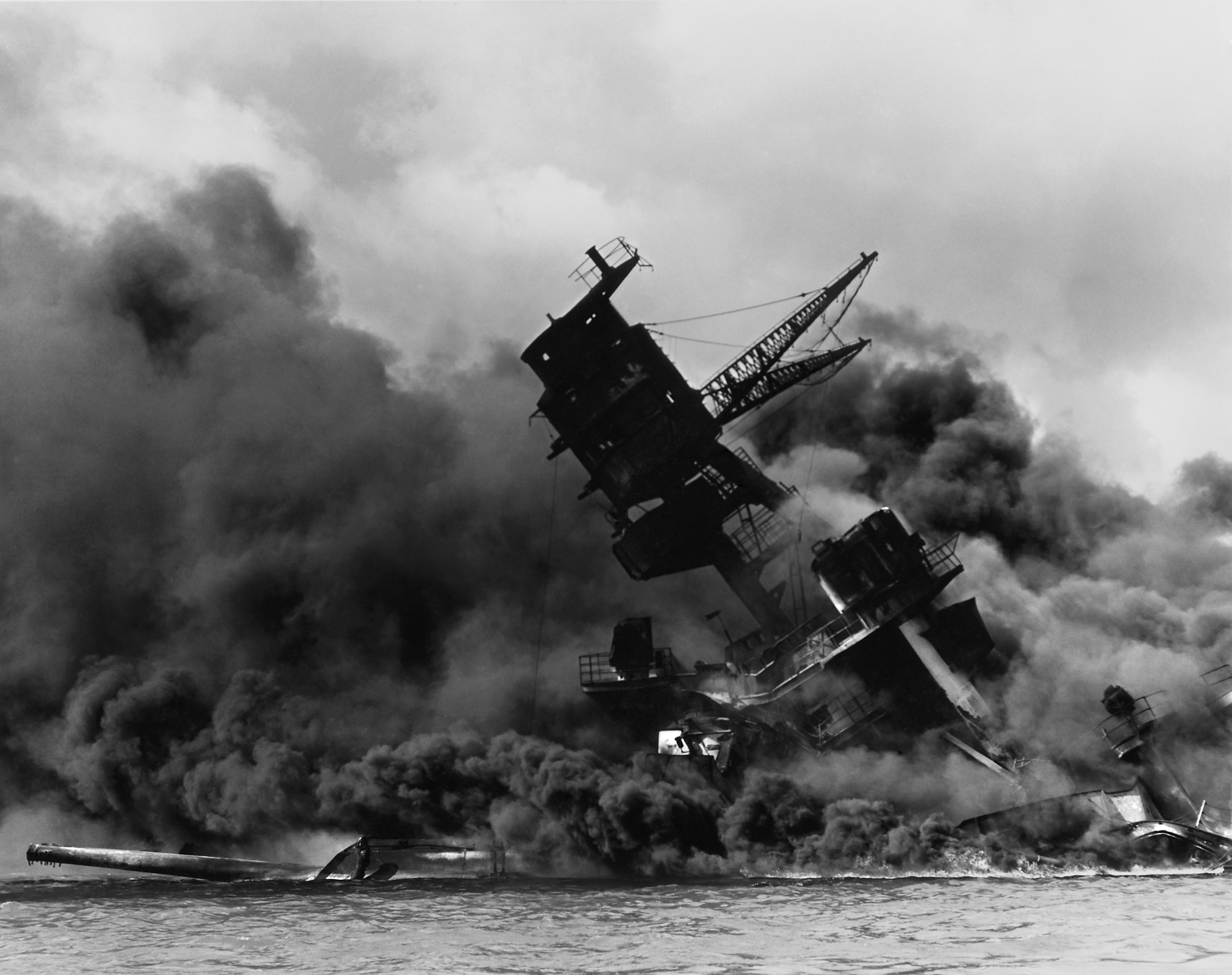
December 7, 1941: The destruction of USS Arizona during the attack on Pearl Harbor.

The following events occurred in December 1941:

== December 1, 1941 (Monday) ==
- Japan rejected the latest U.S. proposals as "fantastic and unrealistic".
- The Battle of Pljevlja was fought in the Italian governorate of Montenegro. Italian military forces repulsed an attack by Montenegrin Partisans.
- Field Marshal Gerd von Rundstedt resigned following the German retreat from Rostov.
- Karl Jäger wrote the Jäger Report, the most precise surviving document of the activities of an Einsatzkommando unit.
- A worldwide electric drill and power saw brand, Hilti was founded in Liechtenstein, that first business start on workshop section.
- The German 15th Panzer Division routed the 20th Battalion of the 2nd New Zealand Division at Belhamed, Libya, but tanks of the British 4th Armoured Brigade drove off the attack.
- U.S. President Franklin D. Roosevelt cut short his vacation in Warm Springs, Georgia, and returned to Washington, D.C. due to the critical situation in the Pacific.
- The United States Civil Air Defense Services (CADS), now known as the Civil Air Patrol, was formed.

== December 2, 1941 (Tuesday) ==
- The Battle of Hanko ended in Finnish victory.
- The Red Army set up the Moscow Defence Zone.
- Adolf Hitler issued Directive No. 38, ordering reinforcement of the Luftwaffe presence in the Mediterranean.
- Japanese Rear Admiral Matome Ugaki received an order authorizing the Combined Fleet to attack any time after midnight on December 7, Japan time. Based on this order, Ugaki sent a wireless communication with the coded message "Climb Mount Niitaka", meaning the attacks were to go forward as planned.
- President Roosevelt sent Japan a request for an explanation for the heavy Japanese troop concentrations in French Indochina, exceeding the 25,000 agreed upon between Tokyo and Vichy France.
- U.S. "Magic" cryptologists intercepted Japanese orders to destroy codes at the Japanese embassy in Washington.
- Born: Sean P. F. Hughes, Emeritus Professor of Orthopedic Surgery, in Farnham, Surrey, England (d. 2025)
- Died: Edward Rydz-Śmigły, 55, Polish general and politician (heart failure)

== December 3, 1941 (Wednesday) ==
- Erwin Rommel's assault toward the garrisons at Bardia, Sallum and Halfaya Pass was repulsed by the Allies.
- The Japanese carrier fleet tasked with the Pearl Harbor attack began approaching the Hawaiian Islands with increased speed.
- U.S. secretary of state Cordell Hull gave a press conference expressing a pessimistic view of U.S.–Japan relations, saying that the months of discussions to this point had never reached a stage where actual negotiations toward a peaceful settlement could take place.
- China Radio International was founded.
- The first issue of the Chicago Sun (later merged with another paper to become the Chicago Sun-Times) was published.
- Died: Christian Sinding, 85, Norwegian composer

== December 4, 1941 (Thursday) ==
- Japanese invasion fleets departed from various locations for their destinations in Malaya and Thailand.
- Japanese aircraft scouted Wake Island undetected.
- Rainbow Five, the U.S. government's top-secret war plan, was leaked on the front pages of the Chicago Tribune and Washington Times-Herald. The plan alarmed isolationists who took it as proof that President Roosevelt was preparing to lead the United States into war against Germany, despite his pledge during the 1940 election that no Americans would be sent into foreign wars. Senator Burton K. Wheeler, without mentioning his own role in the leak, demanded a congressional investigation.
- German submarine U-599 was commissioned.
- Born: David Johnston, television news presenter, in Melbourne, Australia

== December 5, 1941 (Friday) ==
- Britain declared war on Finland, Hungary and Romania.
- Japan responded to Roosevelt's inquiry of December 2 by saying that foreign reports of the number of Japanese troops in French Indochina were exaggerated and the troop concentrations were in full accord with the agreement between Tokyo and Vichy.
- U.S. War Secretary Henry L. Stimson said during a press conference that those responsible for the previous day's leaking of American war plans were "wanting in loyalty and patriotism." Stimson also offered a statement asking, "What would you think of an American general staff which in the present condition of the world did not investigate and study every conceivable type of emergency which may confront this country and every possible method of meeting that emergency?" The White House made no other comment on the matter and it would quickly be forgotten about after the events of December 7.
- German submarine U-175 was commissioned.
- The Soviet Red Army launched a massive counter-offensive against the German Forces during the Battle of Moscow which effectively put Operation Typhoon to an end.

== December 6, 1941 (Saturday) ==
- U.S. president Roosevelt wrote a personal appeal to Emperor Hirohito to avoid war between the United States and Japan. "Developments are occurring in the Pacific area which threaten to deprive each of our Nations and all humanity of the beneficial influence of the long peace between our two countries." the president wrote. "Those developments contain tragic possibilities ... I address myself to Your Majesty at this moment in the fervent hope that Your Majesty may, as I am doing, give thought in this definite emergency to ways of dispelling the dark clouds. I am confident that both of us, for the sake of the peoples not only of our own great countries but for the sake of humanity in neighboring territories, have a sacred duty to restore traditional amity and prevent further death and destruction in the world."
- Finnish II Corps and Group "O" captured Medvezhyegorsk.
- The British submarine HMS Perseus struck a mine and sank in the Ionian Sea off Cephalonia.
- SS Greenland hit a mine and was sunk in the North Sea near Lowestoft with the loss of nine men.
- Born:
  - Vittorio Mezzogiorno, actor, in Cercola, Italy (d. 1994)
  - Bruce Nauman, artist, in Fort Wayne, Indiana
  - Richard Speck, mass murderer, in Kirkwood, Illinois (d. 1991)

== December 7, 1941 (Sunday) ==
- Japan launched its invasion of British Malaya, at Kota Bharu, at 7:00 am Hawaiian Time (1:00 am 8 December Malaya time).
- The Japanese surprise attack on Pearl Harbor began at 7:55 a.m. Hawaiian Time. 21 American ships and over 300 aircraft were sunk, destroyed or damaged, and 2,403 Americans were killed. Japan lost 29 planes in return.
- Japan declared war on the United States, Great Britain, Australia, Canada, New Zealand and South Africa.
- The Japanese midget submarine HA. 19 ran aground and was scuttled at Oahu. Eventually Americans retrieved the sub and Kazuo Sakamaki became the first Japanese prisoner of war to be captured by American forces.
- The Niihau incident began when Japanese pilot Shigenori Nishikaichi crash-landed his damaged A6M2 Zero on the Hawaiian island of Niihau after participating in the attack on Pearl Harbor. The local Hawaiians, who were as yet unaware of the attack and could not communicate with Nishikaichi, sent, in succession, for two locals of Japanese ancestry who agreed to help the pilot to retrieve his papers and escape.
- Winston Churchill was dining at Chequers, the country house of the prime minister of the United Kingdom, with the American diplomats John Gilbert Winant and W. Averell Harriman when the news of the Pearl Harbor attack arrived. Churchill realized that the United States would now enter the war and that Britain would no longer have to fight alone. He later wrote of that night, "Being saturated and satiated with emotion and sensation, I went to bed and slept the sleep of the saved and thankful."
- One hour after the Japanese attack, Australian prime minister John Curtin announced that "from one hour ago, Australia has been at war with the Japanese Empire." War would be formally declared two days later.
- German forces withdrew from Tikhvin.
- Hitler issued the Nacht und Nebel ("Night and Fog") decree, targeting political dissidents for disappearances.
- Realizing that success on the Tobruk front was unlikely at this time, Erwin Rommel pulled his forces 10 miles (16 km) back toward the Gazala line.
- German submarine U-208 was sunk off Gibraltar by depth charges from the British destroyers Harvester and Hesperus.
- Canada declared war on Finland, Hungary, Japan, and Romania.
- Panama declared war on Japan.
- The Japanese conducted the First Bombardment of Midway, killing four and wounding 10.
- The American cargo ship SS Cynthia Olson was sunk by the Japanese submarine I-26.
- Born: Melba Pattillo Beals, journalist and member of the Little Rock Nine, in Little Rock, Arkansas
- Died: Isaac C. Kidd, 57, American admiral and posthumous recipient of the Medal of Honor (killed in the Pearl Harbor attack)

== December 8, 1941 (Monday) ==
- Hitler issued Directive No. 39, cancelling offensive operations on the Eastern Front and ordering the Wehrmacht to switch to defensive formations.
- New Zealand declared war on Japan at 11:00 a.m. New Zealand time.
- The Japanese carried out the Bombing of Singapore, killing 61.
- The Imperial Japanese Army occupies the Shanghai International Settlement. In the midst of this, HMS Peterel is sunk by the gunboat USS Wake, which has been hijacked by Japanese soldiers.
- President Roosevelt made the Infamy Speech (with its famous opening line "Yesterday, December 7, 1941, a date which will live in infamy,") to a Joint session of Congress. Within one hour the United States declared war on Japan. Lifelong pacifist Jeannette Rankin was the only member of Congress to vote against declaring war.
- The United Kingdom declared war on Japan.
- Costa Rica, the Dominican Republic, El Salvador, Haiti, Honduras, the Dutch government-in-exile, the Greek government-in-exile and Nicaragua also declared war on Japan.
- The British House of Commons convened on short notice in light of recent events. Winston Churchill made a speech concluding, "We have at least four-fifths of the population of the globe upon our side. We are responsible for their safety and for their future. In the past we have had a light which flickered, in the present we have a light which flames, and in the future there will be a light which shines over all the land and sea."
- The Japanese invasion of Thailand occurred. A ceasefire was reached in only a few hours; Thailand formed an alliance with Japan and declared war on the Allies.
- The Malayan Campaign, Philippines Campaign, Dutch East Indies campaign, Battle of Guam, Battle of Wake Island and Battle of Hong Kong began.
- Japanese troops invaded Batan Island.
- The Japanese troopship Awazisan Maru was bombed by a Lockheed Hudson aircraft of No. 1 Squadron, Royal Australian Air Force and abandoned off Kota Bharu, Malaya.
- The second day of the Rumbula massacre occurred near Riga, Latvia. A total of about 25,000 Jews were killed on this day and November 30.
- Charles Lindbergh released a statement through the America First Committee that said: "We have been stepping closer to war for many months. Now it has come and we must meet it as united Americans regardless of our attitude toward the policy our government has followed. Whether or not that policy has been wise, our country has been attacked by force of arms and we must retaliate."
- German submarine U-511 was commissioned.
- The U.S. Supreme Court decided Lisenba v. California.

== December 9, 1941 (Tuesday) ==
- Soviet forces captured Yelets south of Moscow.
- President Roosevelt gave a fireside chat on the U.S. declaration of war on Japan.
- China formally declared war on Japan, Germany and Italy. The Second Sino-Japanese War had been undeclared up to this time despite being in its fifth year.
- Cuba and Guatemala declared war on Japan.
- British Commandos conducted Operation Kitbag, a raid on the Norwegian town of Florø.
- Cleveland Indians pitching ace Bob Feller enlisted in the United States Navy Reserve.
- German submarine U-659 was commissioned.
- The US allowed Mexican troops to transit US territory from Nogales, Arizona to San Diego, California en route to Tijuana, Mexico. This was part of an effort to bolster West Coast defenses in case of a Japanese invasion.
- Born: Beau Bridges, actor and director, in Los Angeles, California
- Died: Eduard von Böhm-Ermolli, 85, Austrian general

== December 10, 1941 (Wednesday) ==
- Sinking of Prince of Wales and Repulse: A naval battle took place north of Singapore in which the British battleship Prince of Wales and battlecruiser Repulse were sunk by Japanese aircraft.
- The Battle of Guam ended in Japanese victory.
- The Japanese occupation of the Gilbert Islands began on Butaritari (Makin).
- Japanese forces invaded Vigan and Aparri.
- The American submarine USS Sealion was bombed and damaged during a Japanese air-raid on the Cavite Navy Yard.
- Los Angeles had its first blackout of the war.
- Born: Kyu Sakamoto, singer and actor, in Kawasaki, Kanagawa, Japan (d. 1985), Tommy Kirk, actor (d. 2021).
- Died: Tom Phillips, 53, British admiral and highest ranking Allied officer killed in battle during WWII (died in the sinking of the Prince of Wales)

== December 11, 1941 (Thursday) ==
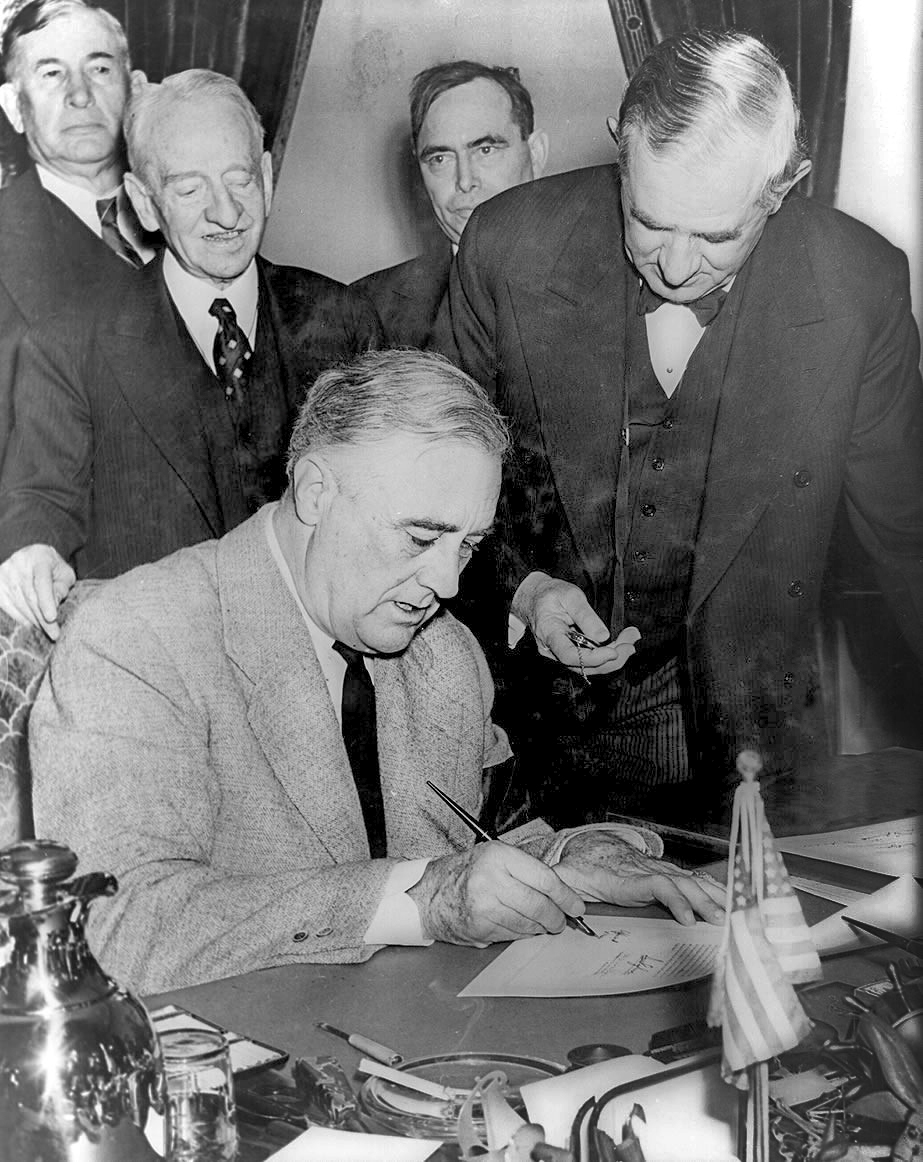
US president Franklin D. Roosevelt Signs a Declaration of War Against Germany

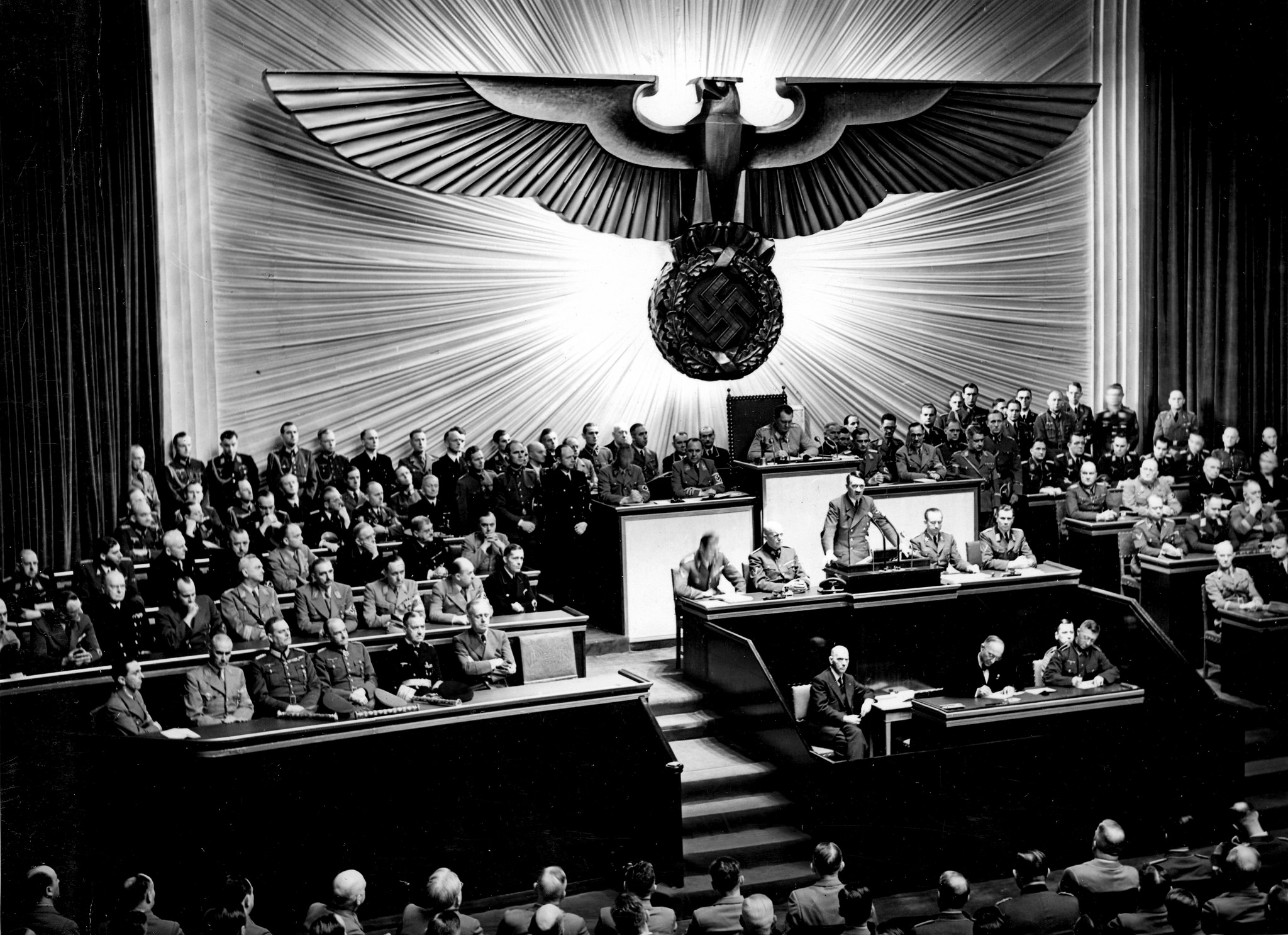
German dictator Adolf Hitler Declares War on The United States 4 Days after The Attack on Pearl Harbor

- Germany declared war on the United States. Hitler gave a speech to the Reichstag announcing the declaration of war.
- Italy declared war on the United States. "The powers of the steel pact, Fascist Italy and Nationalist Socialist Germany, ever closely linked, participate from today on the side of heroic Japan against the United States of America," Benito Mussolini declared in a statement.
- Germany, Italy and Japan signed a new pact barring any of them from making a separate peace with the United States or Great Britain.
- President Roosevelt sent a message to Congress asking for formal recognition of a state of war with Germany and Italy. Congress passed the Joint Resolution Declaring That a State of War Exists Between The Government of Germany and the Government and the People of the United States and Making Provisions To Prosecute The Same. along with an identical resolution for Italy.
- The Polish and Dutch governments-in-exile declared war on Japan.
- The Battle of Jitra began as part of the Malayan Campaign.
- Soviet forces captured Istra west of Moscow.
- During the Battle of Wake Island, the Japanese destroyer Hayate was sunk by American coast-defense guns and the destroyer Kisaragi was bombed and sunk.
- The British destroyer HMS Jackal was damaged in the Mediterranean Sea by Italian torpedo bombers and knocked out of action until May 1942.
- The America First Committee held a special meeting and voted to dissolve itself. The organization expressed no regrets for its past activities and declared, "Our principles were right. Had they been followed, war could have been avoided."
- German submarine U-600 was commissioned.
- Born: J. Frank Wilson, singer, in Lufkin, Texas (d. 1991)
- Died: John Gillespie Magee Jr., 19, American aviator and poet (mid-air collision over Lincolnshire); Émile Picard, 85, French mathematician

== December 12, 1941 (Friday) ==
- The Reich Chancellery meeting of 12 December 1941 was held between Hitler and high-ranking officials of the Nazi Party. The meeting marked a decisive step toward the implementation of the Final Solution when Hitler announced that the Jewish race was to be annihilated.
- The Japanese invaded Legaspi in southern Luzon.
- The Japanese began the shelling of Johnston and Palmyra.
- Romania and Bulgaria declared war on the United States and Britain; both countries responded in kind.
- Haiti, El Salvador and Panama declared war on Germany and Italy.
- German Jews were forbidden to use public telephones.
- German submarine U-458 was commissioned.
- The Universal Horror film The Wolf Man starring Lon Chaney Jr. was released.
- Died: César Basa, 25 or 26, Filipino pilot (killed in action)

== December 13, 1941 (Saturday) ==
- The Battle of Cape Bon was fought off Cape Bon, Tunisia. The Italian cruisers Alberico da Barbiano and Alberto di Giussano were sunk and the Allies took no losses in return.
- The Battle of Jitra ended in Japanese victory.
- New Zealand and Indian troops attacked the Gazala Line in Libya but were halted by German tanks.
- Hungary declared war on the United States.
- Great Britain, New Zealand and South Africa declared war on Bulgaria.
- Honduras declared war on Germany and Italy.
- The Niihau incident ended with the death of Shigenori Nishikaichi in a struggle with people on the island and the suicide of one of his confederates, Yoshio Harada. The incident may have influenced the U.S. government's decision to intern Japanese Americans during the war, out of a belief that American citizens of Japanese ancestry might aid Japan.
- Between 4,000 and 6,000 people were killed in Huaraz, Peru when a glacier partially collapsed into a nearby lake and triggered a moraine landslide.
- Born: John Davidson, singer, actor and television host, in Pittsburgh, Pennsylvania

== December 14, 1941 (Sunday) ==
- The Battle of Gurun began in the Malayan Campaign.
- The Independent State of Croatia declared war on the United States and Britain.
- The British light cruiser HMS Galatea was torpedoed and sunk off Alexandria by the German submarine U-557.
- Born: Ellen Willis, journalist, feminist and music critic, in New York City (d. 2006)

== December 15, 1941 (Monday) ==
- Soviet forces captured Klin, northwest of Moscow.
- The largest of the Liepāja massacres began in Latvia. From this date through December 17 a total of 2,731 Jews and 23 communists were massacred by the Nazis.
- The British 4th Armoured Brigade arrived at Bir Halegh el Eleba where they planned to outflank the Axis forces.
- German submarine U-127 was depth charged and sunk in the Atlantic Ocean by the Australian destroyer HMAS Nestor.
- German submarines U-176 and U-216 were commissioned.
- The British cargo ship Empire Barracuda was torpedoed and sunk in the Atlantic Ocean by the German submarine U-77.
- The site of the Rose Bowl Game was transferred from Pasadena, California to Durham, North Carolina.
- The radio program We Hold These Truths was aired live, the first program broadcast on all four major U.S. radio networks simultaneously. The hour-long special commemorated the 150th anniversary of the United States Bill of Rights which was ratified on December 15, 1791.

== December 16, 1941 (Tuesday) ==
- The Battle of Gurun ended in Japanese victory.
- The Battle of Borneo began.
- The Czechoslovak government-in-exile declared war on all countries at war with the United States, Britain and the USSR.
- Axis forces began to fall back to El Agheila, moving too quickly for the British 4th Armoured Brigade to outflank their retreat.
- Hitler called on the German troops of the Eastern Front to mount "fanatical resistance" and prohibited any retreat around Moscow.
- Japanese battleship Yamato was commissioned.
- German submarine U-557 was accidentally rammed and sunk by the Italian torpedo boat Orione west of Crete.
- Brześć Ghetto was created in Nazi-occupied Poland.
- Born: Lesley Stahl, television journalist, in Lynn, Massachusetts

== December 17, 1941 (Wednesday) ==
- The naval engagement known as the First Battle of Sirte was fought in the Gulf of Sirte with an indecisive result.
- Japanese forces invaded Penang Island.
- Albania declared war on the United States.
- Husband E. Kimmel was relieved of his command of the U.S. Pacific Fleet as part of a shake-up of officers following the Pearl Harbor attack. Kimmel was replaced by Chester Nimitz.
- The American passenger ship Corregidor struck a mine and sank in Manila Bay.
- The Japanese destroyer Shinonome was sunk near Miri, Sarawak, probably from an air attack.
- German submarine U-131 was heavily damaged by British ships and aircraft and scuttled west of Madeira, Portugal.
- The Chungpu earthquake in Taiwan claimed 358 lives.

== December 18, 1941 (Thursday) ==
- Japanese troops landed on Hong Kong Island.
- Citing stomach illness, Fedor von Bock relinquished command of Army Group Centre to Günther von Kluge.
- German submarine U-434 was depth charged and sunk by the British destroyers Blankney and Stanley north of Madeira.
- The War Powers Act of 1941 was put into law in the United States.
- Manhattan Project: The S-1 Committee formally met for the first time and recommended that $400,000 be assigned to Ernest Lawrence's work in electromagnetic isotope separation.
- President Roosevelt issued Executive Order 8983, appointing a commission headed by Supreme Court Justice Owen Roberts to investigate the Pearl Harbor attack in order to determine "whether any derelictions of duty or errors of judgment on the part of United States Army or Navy personnel" contributed to the success of the Japanese attack, "and if so, what these derelictions or errors were, and who were responsible therefor."
- German submarines U-256, U-407 and U-601 were commissioned.
- The swashbuckler film The Corsican Brothers starring Douglas Fairbanks Jr., Ruth Warrick and Akim Tamiroff had its world premiere in Washington, D.C.
- Born: Prince William of Gloucester, in Barnet, England (d. 1972)
- Died: Dmitry Lavrinenko, 27, Russian tank commander and Hero of the Soviet Union (killed in action)

== December 19, 1941 (Friday) ==
- The Japanese invasion of Davao began.
- Indian 4th Division captured Derna, Libya.
- Italian Navy divers of Decima Flottiglia MAS carried out the Raid on Alexandria, attacking and disabling two Royal Navy battleships with manned torpedoes.
- Nicaragua declared war on Bulgaria, Hungary and Romania.
- Hitler relieved Walther von Brauchitsch as Commander-in-Chief of the German Army and took personal command himself. A proclamation announcing the move was published two days later.
- The British light cruiser HMS Neptune struck naval mines off Tripoli and sank. The destroyer Kandahar struck a mine and was damaged trying to come to Neptune's rescue and had to be scuttled the next day.
- The British destroyer Stanley was torpedoed and sunk in the Atlantic Ocean by German submarine U-574. The sloop HMS Stork then depth charged, rammed and sank U-574.
- Born: Lee Myung-bak, 10th president of South Korea, in Osaka, Japan; Maurice White, musician and founder of Earth, Wind & Fire, in Memphis, Tennessee (d. 2016)
- Died: John Robert Osborn, 42, Canadian recipient of the Victoria Cross (killed in action in Hong Kong)
- Died: John K. Lawson, 54, the highest-ranking Canadian officer to be killed in World War II (killed in action in Hong Kong)

== December 20, 1941 (Saturday) ==
- The Belgian government in exile declared war on Japan.
- Joseph Goebbels announced a winter clothing collection drive for troops on the Eastern Front. Rather than admitting to a supply shortage he presented it as an expression of solidarity between the soldiers and the homeland.
- The American tanker Emidio was torpedoed and damaged off Cape Mendocino, California by the Japanese submarine I-17, killing five crew. A Catalina flying boat was dispatched to attack the I-17, but the submarine escaped.
- Charles Lindbergh wrote to Chief of Army Air Forces Henry H. Arnold offering to serve in the military.
- German submarines U-90, U-356, U-439 and U-512 were commissioned.
- "Elmer's Tune" by Glenn Miller and His Orchestra hit #1 on the Billboard singles charts.
- The Wabbit Twouble cartoon was released by Warner Bros. Pictures.
- Died: Igor Severyanin, 54, Russian poet

== December 21, 1941 (Sunday) ==
- Japanese troops invaded Lingayen Gulf and Lamon Bay.
- Romanian and German units began murdering the inmates of the Bogdanovka concentration camp. By the end of the year 30,000 Jews would be killed.
- The British escort carrier Audacity was torpedoed and sunk 430 nautical miles west of Cape Finisterre, Spain by the German submarine U-751.
- The Dutch submarine K XVII struck a mine off Tioman Island and sank.
- German submarine U-451 was torpedoed and sunk off Cape Spartel, Morocco by Fairey Swordfish aircraft of 812 Squadron, Fleet Air Arm.
- German submarine U-567 was depth charged and sunk in the Atlantic Ocean by British warships.
- The first play of the twelve-episode radio play cycle The Man Born to Be King, based on the life of Jesus, premiered on the BBC Home Service.
- The Chicago Bears beat the New York Giants 37-9 in the NFL Championship Game at Wrigley Field in Chicago.
- Born: Lo Hoi-pang, actor, in Panyu, China

== December 22, 1941 (Monday) ==
- Allied troops reached Beda Fomm but were halted by 30 German tanks. Axis forces began evacuating Benghazi by sea.
- The Battle of Sjenica was fought in the Italian governorate of Montenegro. The Yugoslav Partisans were defeated.
- Winston Churchill arrived in Washington, D.C. aboard HMS Duke of York after a secret ten-day journey across the Atlantic. The Arcadia Conference began.
- German submarine U-380 was commissioned.
- The 1942 NFL draft was held. The Pittsburgh Steelers selected Bill Dudley of the University of Virginia as the number one overall pick.

== December 23, 1941 (Tuesday) ==
- The Battle of Wake Island ended in Japanese victory.
- The Japanese invasions of Lingayen Gulf and Lamon Bay were completed.
- Douglas MacArthur declared Manila an open city and began withdrawing to Bataan.
- The British passenger ship Shuntien was torpedoed and sunk west of Alexandria by German submarine U-559.
- German submarine U-79 was depth charged and sunk off Bardia, Libya by British warships.
- Pope Pius XII authorized all local officials of the Catholic Church to permit the faithful to dispense with the laws of fast and abstinence for the duration of the war. This dispensation did not apply to Ash Wednesday or Good Friday.
- Born: Tim Hardin, folk musician and composer, in Eugene, Oregon (d. 1980)

== December 24, 1941 (Wednesday) ==
- Japanese troops captured Kuching, Sarawak.
- The third Battle of Changsha began.
- The shelling of Johnston and Palmyra ended inconclusively.
- Haiti declared war on Bulgaria, Hungary and Romania.
- The American steamer Absaroka was torpedoed off Point Fermin, California by Japanese submarine I-19 and beached at Fort MacArthur.
- The Japanese destroyer Sagiri was torpedoed and sunk off Kuching, Borneo by the Dutch submarine K XVI.
- The British corvette Salvia was torpedoed and sunk west of Alexandria by German submarine U-568.
- The British submarine H31 was lost, probably to a naval mine in the Bay of Biscay.
- German submarine U-460 was commissioned.
- Born: John Levene, actor, in Salisbury, England

== December 25, 1941 (Thursday) ==
- The Battle of Hong Kong ended in surrender of the British Crown Colony. The Japanese occupation of Hong Kong began. Two Canadian battalions were lost.
- The Japanese invasion of Davao ended in Japanese victory.
- Sir Alan Brooke became Chief of the General Staff.
- Rudolf Schmidt was appointed Commander of the 2nd Panzer Army, replacing the sacked Heinz Guderian.
- In a coup de main, Free French forces overthrew the pro-Vichy government of Saint Pierre and Miquelon off Newfoundland.
- The British destroyer Thracian ran aground in Hong Kong and scuttled.
- The American submarine USS Sealion was scuttled at Cavite Navy Yard to prevent her from becoming useful to the Japanese.
- Dutch submarine K XVI was torpedoed and sunk west of Kuching by Japanese submarine I-66.
- The stage musical Banjo Eyes with music by Vernon Duke, lyrics by John La Touche and Harold Adamson and starring Eddie Cantor premiered on Broadway at the Hollywood Theatre.
- Died: Blanche Bates, 68, American actress

== December 26, 1941 (Friday) ==
- The Battle of the Kerch Peninsula began.
- The Allies withdrew from the Malayan city of Ipoh.
- British Commandos launched Operation Anklet, the raid on the Lofoten Islands.
- Winston Churchill addressed a joint meeting of U.S. Congress. He predicted that at least 18 months would be required to turn the tide of the war and warned that "many disappointments and unpleasant surprises await us."
- The musical film Hellzapoppin' starring the vaudeville comedy team of Olsen and Johnson was released.

== December 27, 1941 (Saturday) ==
- The Germans flanked the British 22nd Armoured Brigade at El Haseia and destroyed many tanks. This removed any immediate danger to Ajdabiya and allowed the Axis forces to fall back in an organized fashion to the defensive line at El Agheila without having to deal with pressure from the enemy.
- British Commandos completed Operation Anklet successfully.
- British Combined Operations executed Operation Archery, a raid against German positions on the island of Vågsøy, Norway.
- The dramatic play Clash by Night by Clifford Odets premiered at the Belasco Theatre on Broadway.
- Born: Miles Aiken, basketball player, in New York City; Mike Pinder, keyboardist, singer, songwriter and member of the Moody Blues, in Erdington, Birmingham, England (d. 2024)

== December 28, 1941 (Sunday) ==
- Lieutenant-general Thomas Jacomb Hutton assumed command of Burma Army.
- The British cargo ship Volo was torpedoed and sunk off the coast of Egypt by German submarine U-75. The destroyer HMS Kipling chased the U-boat down and sank U-75 with depth charges.
- 70-year-old Warden James Brooks Jackson of the Pulaski County, Arkansas Sheriff's Office, serving as superintendent of the Pulaski County Prison Farm, was shot and killed by the assistant warden, who believed Jackson was about to fire him. The assistant warden would be convicted of voluntary manslaughter and receive a two-year prison sentence. In 1999, Jackson's grandson, architect Brooks Jackson, would submit a successful bid for the design of the Arkansas Fallen Firefighters Memorial in memory of his grandfather.

== December 29, 1941 (Monday) ==
- The Japanese bombed Corregidor for the first time.
- The Red Army took back the Crimean city of Kerch.
- Indianapolis Motor Speedway President Eddie Rickenbacker announced that the 1942 Indianapolis 500 was cancelled and that the race would not be held again until after the war.
- German submarine U-602 was commissioned.
- Born: Ray Thomas, flautist, singer, songwriter and member of The Moody Blues, in Stourport-on-Severn, England (d. 2018)
- Died: Tullio Levi-Civita, 68, Italian mathematician

== December 30, 1941 (Tuesday) ==
- Operation Crusader ended in Allied victory.
- The Battle of Kampar began in Malaya.
- Japanese forces occupied Kuantan.
- Ernest King assumed command of the United States Fleet.
- Soviet troops made amphibious landings in the eastern Crimea and took Kerch and Feodosia. The Germans had to pause their assault on Sevastopol in order to deal with these forces.
- Winston Churchill made the "Chicken Speech" to Canadian Parliament. In reference to a comment made by Philippe Pétain that Britain would be invaded and "have its neck wrung like a chicken" by the Germans in three weeks, Churchill exclaimed, "Some chicken! Some neck!"
- German submarines U-705 and U-756 were commissioned.
- American socialite and art collector Peggy Guggenheim married the expatriate German artist Max Ernst in the United States.
- Born: Mel Renfro, NFL cornerback, in Houston, Texas
- Died: El Lissitzky, 51, Russian artist

== December 31, 1941 (Wednesday) ==
- Venezuela broke off diplomatic relations with Germany, Italy and Japan.
- Panamanian cargo ship Ruth Alexander was bombed and damaged by a Japanese flying boat in Makassar Strait. A Dutch Dornier 24 rescued the 48 survivors and the ship was abandoned, finally sinking two days later.
- Born: Alex Ferguson, footballer and manager, in Glasgow, Scotland
- Died: Sol Hess, 69, American comic strip writer
