= 15th Indian Infantry Brigade =

- Active: 1940–1942
- Country: (British Raj) British India
- Allegiance: British Empire
- Branch: British Indian Army
- Type: Infantry
- Size: Brigade
- Engagements: Malayan Campaign

The 15th Indian Infantry Brigade was an infantry brigade formation of the Indian Army during World War II. It was formed in September 1940, at Secunderabad in India and assigned to the 9th Indian Infantry Division. Between February and March 1941, it was attached to the 10th Indian Infantry Division, before returning to the 9th in March 1941 and sailing for Malaya. Once in Malaya the brigade was assigned to the 11th Indian Infantry Division. During the Malayan Campaign after the Battle of Jitra and the Battle of Kampar it absorbed the remnants of the 6th Indian Infantry Brigade in December 1941. The brigade eventually surrendered with the rest of the III Indian Corps after the Battle of Singapore 15 February 1942.

== Formation ==
- 1st Battalion, 14th Punjab Regiment September 1940 to January 1942
- 2nd Battalion, 9th Jat Regiment September 1940 to December 1941
- 3rd Battalion, 16th Punjab Regiment September 1940 to June 1941 and December 1941 to January 1942
- 1st Battalion, Leicestershire Regiment February to December 1941
- British Battalion December 1941 to February 1942 (composite battalion from remnants of destroyed British units)
- 2nd Battalion, 16th Punjab Regiment December 1941 to January 1942
- 5th Battalion, 14th Punjab Regiment December 1941 to January 1942
- The Punjab/Jat Battalion December 1941 to February 1942 (composite battalion from remnants of destroyed Indian units)
- 5th Battalion, 14th Punjab Regiment January to February 1942
- 1st Battalion, 8th Punjab Regiment February 1942

== See also ==
- List of Indian Army Brigades in World War II
