= Japanese order of battle during the Malayan campaign =

The Japanese Imperial Army landed the 25th Army under the command of General Tomoyuki Yamashita on the east coasts of Malaya and Thailand on the night of 7 December 1941.

== History ==
The Japanese Imperial Army invaded Malaya and Thailand on 7 December 1941. The conquest of Malaya was completed in less than three months when Singapore surrendered on 15 February 1942. The Japanese Twenty-Fifth Army under General Tomoyuki Yamashita was given the task of conquering Malaya.

== Order of Battle Japanese 25th Army on 8 December 1941 ==
- Commanding Officer – Lieutenant-General Tomoyuki Yamashita

=== Imperial Guards Division ===
- Lt-Gen Takuma Nishimura

The Imperial Guards Division made its first appearance in the Malayan campaign during the Battle of Muar where it destroyed the 45th Indian Brigade and inflicted heavy casualties on the two supporting Australian infantry battalions. The Imperial Guards took part in the Battle of Singapore.

- 3rd Konoye Regt.
- 4th Konoye Regt. – Colonel Kentaro Kunishi
- 5th Konoye Regt. – Colonel Takeo Iwaguro
  - (each regiment was 2,600 strong. Total strength 12,600)

=== 5th Infantry Division ===
- Lt-Gen Takuro Matsui
- (motor transport)

The 5th Division faced the brunt of British defences throughout the Battle of Malaya and participated in the invasion of Singapore. The 5th Division landed at Patani and Singora in Thailand on 7 December 1941 and then proceeded to attack down the west coast of Malaya. The 41st Regiment of 5th Division suffered heavy casualties at the Battle of Kampar when the 11th Indian Division set up an artillery and infantry ambush, but a few days later the 5th Division managed to destroy the 12th Indian and 28th Gurkha Brigades of the 11th Indian Division at the Battle of Slim River between 6 and 8 January 1942. The 11th and 41st Regiments of 5th Division suffered heavy casualties at the hands of the Australian 8th Division at the ambush at Gemencheh Bridge.

- 9th Infantry Brigade – Maj. Gen. Saburo Kawamura
  - 11th Regiment – Colonel Tsunahiko Watanabe
  - 41st Regiment – Colonel Kanichi Okabe
- 21st Infantry Brigade – Major-General Eikichi Sugiura
  - 21st Regiment – Colonel Noriyoshi Harada
  - 42nd Regiment – Colonel Tadao Ando
  - (each regiment 2,600 strong. Total strength 15,300.)
- Shimada Tank Company – attached to 42nd Regiment

=== 18th Infantry Division ===
- Lt-Gen Renya Mutaguchi
- (horse transport)

This division supplied the troops used in the invasion of Malaya at Kota Bharu. The 18th Division attacked down the east coast of Malaya and participated in the Battle of Singapore especially at Bukit Timah.

- 23rd Infantry Brigade – Maj. Gen. Hiroshi Takumi
  - 55th Regiment – Colonel Hiroshi Koba
  - 56th Regiment – Col. Yoshio Nasu
- 35th Infantry Brigade – Major-General Kiyotake Kawaguchi
  - 114th Regiment – Colonel Hitashi Kohisa
  - 124th Regiment
- (each regiment was 3,500 strong. Total strength 22,200.)
- 1st Independent Anti-Tank Battalion
- Eight independent anti-tank companies
- 3rd Tank Group, consisting of four tank regiments – 1st (Medium), 2nd (Medium) (arrived 29th Jan. ’42), 6th (Medium) and 14th (Light)

== Auxiliary units ==
=== Artillery ===
- 3rd Independent Mountain Artillery Regiment
- 3rd Heavy Field Artillery Regiment
- 18th Heavy Field Artillery Regiment – Lt.Col. Katsutoshi Takasu
- 21st Heavy Field Artillery Battalion
- Two trench mortar battalions (3rd and 5th Mortar Battalions) horsed.
- 14th Independent Mortar Battalion
- 17th Field Air Defence Unit (consisting of four field anti-aircraft battalions)
- Three independent field anti-aircraft companies
- 1st Balloon Company.

=== Engineers ===
- Four independent engineer regiments:
  - 4th Engineer Regiment
  - 12th Engineer Regiment – Lt.Col. Ichie Fuji
  - 15th Engineer Regiment – Lt.Col. Yosuke Yokoyama
  - 23rd Engineer Regiment
- 5th Independent Heavy Bridging Company
- Three bridging material companies (21st, 22nd and 27th), two horsed, one mechanised
- Two river crossing material companies (10th and 15th), one horsed, one mechanised
- 21st River Crossing Company (horsed)
- 2nd Field Military Police Unit
- 2nd Railway Unit (consisting of two railway regiments, one railway material depot, two railway station offices and two special railway operating units)
- 25th Army Signal Unit (consisting of one telegraph regiment (horsed), one independent wire company (mechanised), three independent wireless platoons (two mechanized, one horsed) and five stationary wireless units)

=== Line of communication (headquarters and units) ===
- These included four L. of C. sector units, eight independent motor transport battalions, twelve independent motor transport companies, two horse transport units, ten land service companies, five construction service companies, also survey, water, road, construction, ordnance and medical units.

== Armoured Units ==
=== 3rd Tank Group ===
- At the beginning of operations, the 3rd Tank Group comprised four tank regiments (three medium, one light) and ancillary units. The 2nd (Medium) Tank Regiment was transferred to 26th Army on 29 January 1942. The group then had 79 medium tanks, 100 light tanks, and 238 other vehicles. The medium tanks, weighing 16 tons, each carried one 57-mm gun and two 7.7-mm MGs; the light tanks (8 tons) had one 37-mm gun and one 7.7-mm MG.
- 1st Tank Regiment – Colonel Mukaida
- 2nd Tank Regiment
- 6th Tank Regiment – Colonel Kawamura / Colonel Tadao Komoto
- 14th (Light) Tank Regiment – Colonel Kita

== Air Units ==
=== Army 3rd Air Corps (飛行集団, Hikō Shudan) ===
- 3rd Hikodan (飛行団) – based in Kampong Trach

- 59th Hiko Sentai (飛行戦隊) – Ki 27's and 43's moved to Thammarat, Thailand
- 27th Hiko Sentai – Ki 51's
- 75th Hiko Sentai – Ki 48's
- 90th Hiko Sentai – Ki 48's

- 7th Hikodan

- 64th Hiko Sentai – Ki 27's and 43's – based in Krakor Indo-China
- 12th Hiko Sentai – Ki 21's – based in Siem Reap, Indo-China, these three units bombed Alor Star, Sungai Patani, and Butterworth
- 60th Hiko Sentai – Ki 21's – based in Krakor – see above
- 98th Hiko Sentai – Ki 21's – based in Krakor – see above

- 12th Hikodan

- 1st Hiko Sentai – Ki 27's – based in Krakor Cambodia and moved to Singora, Thailand

- 11th Hikodan

- 11th Hiko Sentai – Ki 27's – based in Duong Dong, Indo-China and moved to Singora, Thailand

- 15th Dakuritsu Hokotai

- 50th Dokuritsu Dai Shijugo Chutai – Ki 15's
- 51st Dokuritsu Dai Shijugo Chutai – Ki 46's

- 81st Hiko Sentai – Ki 15's and Ki 46's
- 21st Dakuritsu Hokotai

- 82nd Dokuritsu Dai Shijugo Chutai – Ki 30's
- 84th Dokoritsu Dai Shijugo Chutai – Ki 27's

=== Navy 11th Koku Kantai ===
Based at Saigon, these units also served in the Philippines Campaign

- 21st Koku Sentai

- 1st Kokutai – G4M's
- Kanoya Kokutai – G4M's – - attacked Z force
- Toko Kokutai – H6K's

- 22nd Koku Sentai

- 22nd (Genzen) Kokutai – G3M's – attacked Z force
- Mihoro Kokutai – G3M's, A6M's and A5Ms – - attacked Z force

- 23rd Koku Sentai

- 3rd Kokutai – A6Ms and A5Ms
- Tainan Kokutai – A6Ms and A5Ms – attacked the Philippines
- Takao Kokutai – G3Ms

Ship board units

- Mizuho seaplanes
- Chitose seaplanes
- Shina Homen Kantai B5N's and seaplanes

== See also ==
- Malaya Command – Order of Battle
