= Billy Key =

British Indian Army major-general (1895–1986)

Major-General Billy Key CB DSO MC
- Born: 19 December 1895
- Died: 26 September 1986 (aged 90); Sandwich, Kent
- Military career
- Allegiance: United Kingdom
- Branch: British Indian Army
- Service years: 1914–1949
- Rank: Major-General
- Nickname: "Billy"
- Service number: 9051
- Unit: Sikh Regiment
- Commands: Lahore District (1947–1949); Rawalpindi District (1946–1947); 11th Indian Division (1942); 8th Indian Infantry Brigade (1940–1942); 2nd Battalion, 11th Sikh Regiment
- Conflicts: First World War; North-West Frontier; Second World War; Malayan campaign; Fall of Singapore
- Awards: Companion of the Order of the Bath; Distinguished Service Order; Military Cross; Mentioned in Despatches (2)

Major-General Berthold Wells Key, CB, DSO, MC (19 December 1895 – 26 September 1986), known as Billy Key, was a British Indian Army officer.

== Early life ==
Born on 19 December 1895, the son of Dr J.M. Key, he was educated at Dulwich College in London and commissioned onto the Unattached List of the British Army on 1 October 1914. Two months later he transferred to the British Indian Army.

== Military service ==
=== First World War ===
Key served with the 45th Rattray's Sikhs during the First World War, reaching the rank of captain by 1918. He was wounded in Mesopotamia in 1918 and received the Military Cross, the citation for which reads:

For conspicuous gallantry and devotion to duty near Shuraimiyah on 20th October, 1918. During a reconnaissance towards the Fathah position he was ordered to advance and secure a ridge held by the enemy. Although exposed to heavy fire the company successfully reached its objective, where he moved about fearlessly in order to make his dispositions to the best advantage. He was eventually wounded, but refused to undergo treatment until his company had been withdrawn to camp. His behaviour throughout was splendid.

In 1917 he married Aileen Leslie (died 1951), daughter of Colonel E.L. Dunsterville RE, with whom he had a son and two daughters. His son was killed in action in Italy during the Second World War.

=== Between the wars ===
After the First World War Key served in Afghanistan and, with the 3/11th Battalion, Sikh Regiment on the North West Frontier. Attending the Staff College, Quetta, from 1931 to 1932, in 1935 he was promoted to lieutenant colonel and from 1936 he commanded the 2nd Battalion, 11th Sikh Regiment. In 1937 he received the Distinguished Service Order while serving in Waziristan.

=== Second World War ===
He was appointed temporary Deputy Military Secretary, India from 21 December 1939 to 17 August 1940. From 18 August 1940 to 13 January 1942 he commanded the 8th Indian Infantry Brigade in Malaya. Key's brigade were the first British troops to face the Japanese when they invaded Malaya in December 1941. When Major General David Murray-Lyon was dismissed from command of the 11th Indian Division, the 8th Indian Brigade's parent formation, Key was promoted to the acting rank of major general and replaced Brigadier Archibald Paris as commander of the division. Despite proving himself to be an able commander, the situation in Malaya was at this point beyond salvaging and the British-led forces surrendered at Singapore (see fall of Singapore) on 15 February 1942 to a numerically smaller Japanese force. Key spent the remainder of the war as a prisoner of war in Japan.

=== Post-war ===
On his release Key became aide-de-camp to King George VI followed by district commands in India. He was promoted substantive major general on 20 January 1947, with seniority 2 April 1944. He retired in January 1949, and died in Sandwich, Kent, on 26 September 1986.

== Bibliography ==
- Smart, Nick (2005). Biographical Dictionary of British Generals of the Second World War. Barnsley, South Yorkshire: Pen and Sword Books. ISBN 1844150496.
