= 11th Infantry Division (India) =

- Active: 15 September 1940–15 February 1942; 1 April 1965 present
- Country: (British Raj) British India; India
- Allegiance: British India; India
- Branch: British Indian Army; Indian Army
- Type: Infantry
- Size: Division
- Part of: XII Corps
- Garrison/HQ: Ahmedabad
- Nickname: Golden Katar Division
- Motto: Jeet Nishchay
- Engagements: World War II: Battle of Malaya; Battle of Jitra; Battle of Slim River; Battle of Singapore; Indo-Pakistani War of 1965 Indo-Pakistani War of 1971

Commanders
- Current Commander: Maj Gen Mohit Wadwa
- Notable commanders: David Murray-Lyon; Archibald Paris; Billy Key

Insignia
- Identification symbol

The 11th Infantry Division is an infantry division of the Indian Army. It was raised as a part of the Indian Army during World War II. It formed part of Indian III Corps in the Malaya Command during the Battle of Malaya. The division was re-raised on 1 April 1965 and is presently part of the XII Corps of Southern Command. It is presently responsible for safeguarding the borders with Pakistan along Southern Rajasthan and Gujarat.

== History ==
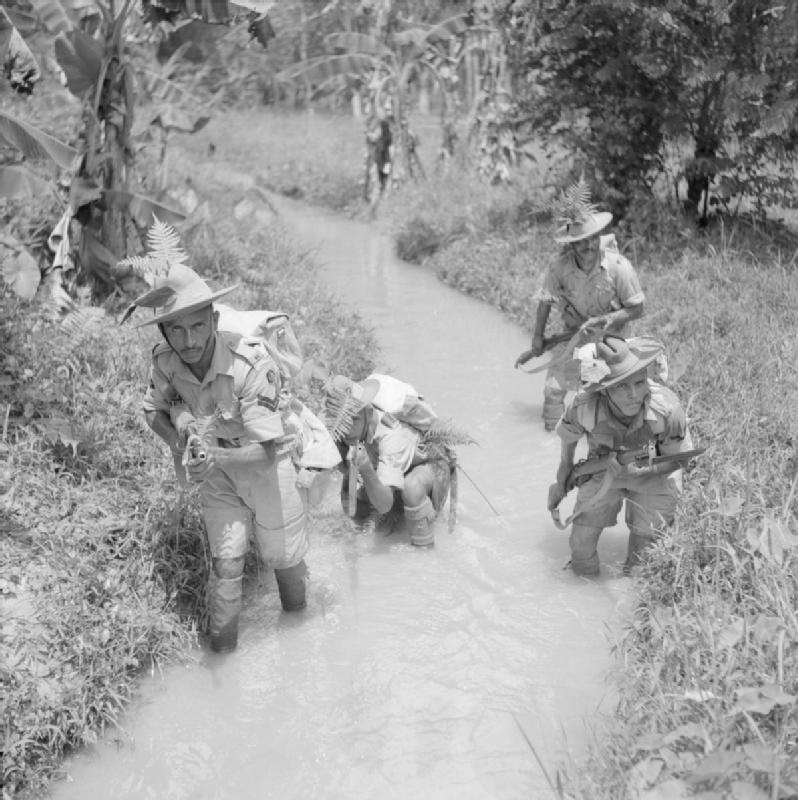
Men of the 2/9th Gurkha Rifles training in the Malayan jungle, October 1941.

It was originally commanded by Major-General Murray-Lyon until 24 December 1941. Under Murray-Lyon the 11th Indian Division was defeated at the Battle of Jitra and suffered some of its worst casualties during the retreat from Jitra and at the Battle of Gurun.

Murray-Lyon was fired by Lieut. Gen. Arthur Percival and replaced by Brig. A.C.M. Paris and then Maj. Gen. Billy Key. This division suffered such heavy casualties during the early stages of the campaign, that the 1st Leicesters and the 2nd East Surreys were forced to amalgamate, becoming the British Battalion and the 1/8th Punjab and the 2/9th Jats were also amalgamated, becoming the Jat-Punjab Battalion. The 6th and 15th Infantry Brigades were also amalgamated becoming the 6th/15th Indian Infantry Brigade.

After the Battle of Jitra the 11th Division, under Major-General Paris, inflicted heavy casualties on the Japanese at the Battle of Kampar, but was almost completely destroyed at the Battle of Slim River. The division was reformed in Singapore with the remains of the 9th Indian Division.

The 11th Indian Division surrendered to the Japanese on 15 February 1942, along with about 130,000 other British and Commonwealth soldiers, when Singapore was surrendered.

== Formation ==
On 10 December 1941, for more details of the brigade units see the individual brigade articles

=== 6th Indian Infantry Brigade ===
Brig. William Oswald Lay

- 1st Battalion, 8th Punjab Regiment - Lieut. Col. R.C.S.Bates
- 2nd Battalion, East Surrey Regiment - Lieut.Col. G.E. Swinton MC
- 2nd Battalion, 16th Punjab Regiment – Lieut. Col. Henry Sloane Larkin

=== 15th Indian Infantry Brigade ===
Brig. K.A. Garrett/ W. St. John Carpendale

- 1st Battalion, Leicestershire Regiment – Lieut. Col. Esmond Morrison (Later commanded the British Battalion)
- 1st Battalion, 14th Punjab Regiment - Lieut.Col.James Fitzpatrick (Wounded at Asun)
- 2nd Battalion, 9th Jat Regiment - Lt.Col. Charles Knowler Tester

=== 28th Indian Infantry Brigade ===
Brig. W.St.John Carpendale/ Ray Selby

- 2nd Battalion, 1st Gurkha Rifles - Lieut.Col.Jack Fulton (Died of wounds as a P.O.W)
- 2nd Battalion, 2nd Gurkha Rifles - Lieut. Col. G.H.D. Woollcombe
- 2nd Battalion, 9th Gurkha Rifles - Lieut.Col.W.R.(Ray) Selby

=== Support units ===
- 3rd Cavalry - Lieut. Col. C.P.G.De Winton
- 1st Battalion, Bahawalpur Infantry, Indian State Forces - Lieut.Col. H.E.Tyrell
- 137th Field Regiment – Lieut. Col. Charles Holmes Royal Artillery (RA) (24x25pdrs)
- 155th (Lanarkshire Yeomanry) Field Regiment, Royal Artillery - Lieut. Col. Augustus Murdoch (16x4.5 inch Howitzers)
- 22nd Mountain Regiment - Lieut. Col. G.L.Hughes Indian Artillery (IA) (12x3.7 inch Howitzers)
- 80th Anti-Tank Regiment RA - Lieut. Col. W.E.S.Napier (48x2pdrs/47mm Breda)
- 3rd Field Company, Indian Engineers (IE)
- 17th Field Company IE
- 23rd Field Company IE
- 46th Army Troops Company IE
- 43rd Field Park Company IE

== Assigned brigades ==
All these brigades were assigned or attached to the division at some time during World War II

- 8th Indian Infantry Brigade
- 12th Indian Infantry Brigade
- 27th Australian Infantry Brigade
- British 53rd Infantry Brigade

== Re-raising ==
11 Infantry Division was re-raised on 1 April 1965 at Yol, Himachal Pradesh as 11 Mountain Division under the command of Major General N. C. Rawlley PVSM, AVSM, MC. The division was subsequently re-organised as an Infantry Division and relocated to Ahmedabad, Gujarat. It was expanded to its full strength by June 1971. The division had the following brigades-

- 31 Infantry Brigade at Bhuj
- 30 Infantry Brigade at Dhrangadhra
- 85 Mountain Brigade at Belgaum

== Indo-Pakistani War of 1965 ==
Soon after raising, the division moved first to Gurdaspur and then to Bhuj for Operation Ablaze. It took over operational control of the Kilo Sector on 29 June 1965. 31 Infantry Brigade of the division took part in Operation Kabaddi and 30 and 85 Infantry Brigades took part in Operation Riddle between September and October 1965. The 'order of battle' for the division was as follows -

Operation Kabaddi

- 31 Infantry Brigade (Brigadier S.S.M. Pahalajani)
  - 1 Mahar
  - 2 Sikh Light Infantry
  - 17 Rajputana Rifles
  - 11 Field Regiment
  - 226 Independent Workshop Company
  - 373 Field Company
  - 31 Infantry Brigade Signal Company
  - 407 Medical Company

Operation Ablaze / Operation Riddle

- 30 Infantry Division (Brigadier J Guha)
  - 5 Maratha Light Infantry
  - 1 Garhwal Rifles
  - 3 Guards
  - 13 Grenadiers (D Squadron)
- 85 Infantry Brigade (Brigadier H.N. Summanwar) (after 18 September)
  - 5 Maratha Light Infantry (from 30 Infantry Division)
  - 17 Madras
- 3 Independent Armoured Squadron (from 1 Horse) (one troop)
- Artillery regiments
  - 95 Composite Mountain Regiment
  - 167 Field Regiment (1673 Field Battery)
  - 954 Heavy Mortar Battery

As the division had a large area of responsibility, the troop deployment was very thin on the ground. Pakistan's Army had the same problem and both forces made limited gains during the war. 30 Infantry Brigade captured Gadra in Sindh on 8 September 1965 and the division captured Dali on 19 September 1965. Pakistani troops captured Munabao railway station and the old fort at Kishangarh in Jaisalmer district. The division eventually captured 388 square kilometres of Pakistani territory in this sector.

Captain SK Mathur of 5 Air Observation Post Flight was awarded the Maha Vir Chakra. The division also won 10 Vir Chakras.

== Indo-Pakistani War of 1971 ==
During Operation Cactus Lily, the division under Major General R.D.R. Anand was responsible for the Barmer sector. This area stretched from Pochheena in Jaisalmer district in the north to the inter-state boundary of Rajasthan and Gujarat in the south. The 'order of battle' for the division was as follows-

- 3 Independent Armoured Squadron (from 1 Horse)
- 17 Grenadiers (camels)
- 2 Grenadiers
- 17 BSF
- 85 Infantry Brigade (Brigadier Gurjeet Singh Randhawa)
  - 2 Rajputana Rifles
  - 2 Mahar
  - 10 Sikh
  - 10 Sikh Light Infantry
- 31 Infantry Brigade
  - 15 Kumaon
  - 9 Madras
  - 18 Madras
  - 20 Rajput
- 330 Infantry Brigade (Brigadier Gurjeet Singh Randhawa)
- 10 Para (Commando) – operated under the area, but was directly under Headquarters, Southern Command
- 11 Artillery Brigade (Brigadier N.M.K. Nayar)
  - 13 Field Regiment
  - 164 Field Regiment
  - 68 Field Regiment
  - 218 Medium Regiment
  - 1981 Light Battery
  - 1521 AD Battery
  - Locating Battery
  - 5 Independent Air Operations Flight

The Pakistani defence in the Barmer sector was weak, with only 55 Brigade of Pakistani 18 Division in the area. The 11th Division attacked on the evening of 4 December 1971 targeting to reach the 'Green belt' area around the Indus River near Hyderabad. 85 and 330 Brigades pushed towards Naya Chor along the rail line, 31 Brigade advanced to Chachra. In the absence of any strong resistance, the division quickly achieved major territorial gains and constructed a link between the Indian and Pakistani rail lines between Munabao in Rajasthan to Khokhrapar in Sindh to support further operations.

Despite the early gains, persistent air attacks by the Pakistan Air Force, supply and logistical problems and finally prolonged hesitation by the division halted the advance on the northern axis, before the troops reached Naya Chor. During this time, Pakistani troops were reinforced by 60 Brigade from 33 Division, which also took over the command of 55 Brigade. On the southern axis, 31 Brigade captured Chachra. Further advances were prevented as the ceasefire was declared. Following the operations, the division captured approximately 9,000 square kilometres of Pakistani territory, the largest in the western sector. The division won the following honours –

Battle honours

- Parbat Ali – 10 Sikh, 2 Mahar, 164 Field Regiment, 68 Field Regiment
- Chachro – 10 Para
- Gadra City – 15 Kumaon, 13 Field Regiment
- Khinsar – 20 Rajput

Gallantry awards

- Maha Vir Chakra
  - Lieutenant Colonel S Bhawani Singh (10 Para)
  - Lieutenant SS Walkar (18 Madras)
- Vir Chakra – 26

== Other operations ==
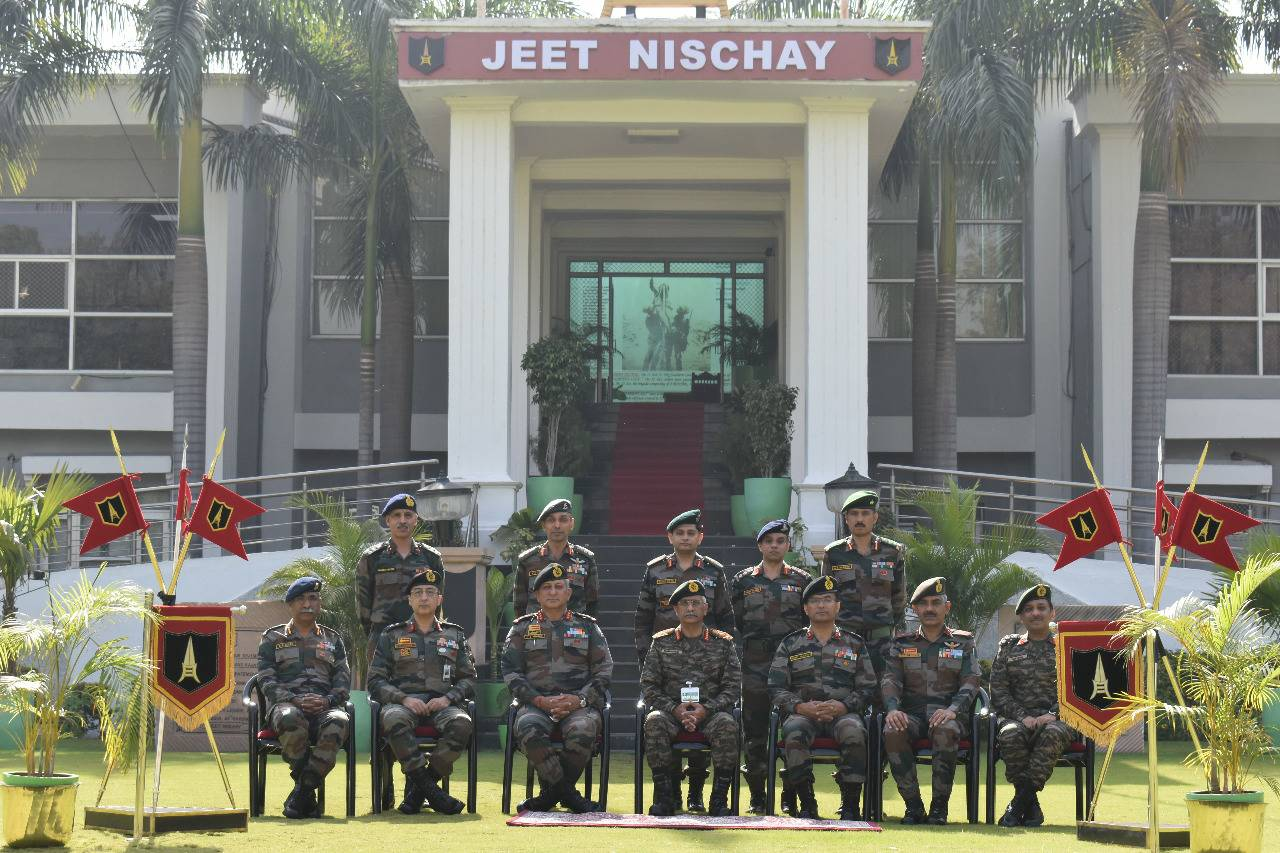
General MM Naravane, COAS visiting Headquarters Golden Katar Division in February 2022

- Operation Trident
- Kargil War (Operation Vijay)
- Operation Parakram
- The division has actively participated in rescue and relief operations during natural calamities in Gujarat.

== Divisional insignia ==
The present formation sign has a black background signifying an infantry division and a Katar facing upwards. The motto of the division is जीत निश्चय (Jeet Nischay), which translates to Victory and Determination.
