= Zhob Brigade =

- Active: 1920–1945
- Country: British India
- Allegiance: British Crown
- Branch: British Indian Army
- Size: Brigade

Commanders
- Notable commanders: Brigadier HBD Baird; Brigadier EJ Ross; Brigadier DM Murray-Lyon; Brigadier RA Stubbings; Brigadier R Eustace

The Zhob Brigade was an infantry formation of the Indian Army during World War II. It was formed in November 1920, for service on the North West Frontier. During World War Two it was normal practice for newly formed battalions to be posted to the North West Frontier for service before being sent to Africa, Burma or Italy.

== Formation ==
These units served in the brigade during World War II

- Hodson's Horse (4th Duke of Cambridge's Own Lancers)
- 1/2nd Gurkha Rifles
- 2/4th Gurkha Rifles
- 4/10th Baluch Regiment
- 5/5th Mahratta Light Infantry
- 2/9th Jat Regiment
- 1/1st Gurkha Rifles
- Nabha Akal Infantry
- 2/11th Sikh Regiment
- Shri Nath Regiment, Nepal
- 4th Gwalior Maharaja Bahadur's Own Battalion
- 6/2nd Punjab Regiment
- 3/2nd Gurkha Rifles
- 4/5th Mahratta Light Infantry
- 6/7th Rajput Regiment
- 14/9th Jat Regiment
- 15/6th Rajputana Rifles
- 15/5th Mahratta Light Infantry
- 4th Jammu and Kashmir Infantry
- 6/18th Royal Garhwal Rifles
- 5/4th Bombay Grenadiers
- 7/11th Sikh Regiment
- 9/9th Jat Regiment
- 6/3rd Madras Regiment
- 7/19th Hyderabad Regiment
- 5/2nd Gurkha Rifles
- 5/9th Gurkha Rifles
- 7/14th Punjab Regiment

== See also ==
- List of Indian Army Brigades in World War II
