= 6th Indian Infantry Brigade =

6th (Lucknow) Infantry Brigade 6th Indian Infantry Brigade
- Active: pre-World War II – 22 December 1941
- Country: British India
- Allegiance: British Empire
- Branch: British Indian Army
- Type: Infantry
- Size: Brigade
- Part of: 11th Indian Infantry Division
- Peacetime HQ: Lucknow
- Engagements: World War II Malayan Campaign Battle of Gurun

The 6th Indian Infantry Brigade was an infantry brigade formation of the Indian Army during World War II. The brigade was a pre-war formation designated 6th (Lucknow) Infantry Brigade in India in September 1939. In November 1940, the brigade arrived in Singapore and come under the command of the 11th Indian Infantry Division. On the 22 December 1941, the brigade was absorbed into the 15th Indian Infantry Brigade after being almost destroyed at the Battle of Gurun on 15 December 1941 soon after the Battle of Jitra. What remained of the brigade surrendered to the Japanese on 15 February 1942, after the Battle of Singapore.

== Composition ==
- 8th Field Regiment, Royal Artillery September 1939 to August 1940
- 1st Battalion, 8th Punjab Regiment September 1939 to December 1941
- 1st Battalion, 3rd Gurkha Rifles September 1939 to January 1940
- 2nd Battalion, 10th Baluch Regiment September to October 1939
- 2nd Battalion, Royal Welch Fusiliers September 1939
- 3rd Battalion, 2nd Punjab Regiment September 1939 to January 1940
- 2nd Battalion, Royal Berkshire Regiment September 1939 to August 1940
- 2nd Battalion, 16th Punjab Regiment October 1939 to December 1941
- 2nd Battalion, 15th Punjab Regiment September 1940 to May 1941
- 1st Battalion, Seaforth Highlanders November 1940 to February 1941
- 2nd Battalion, East Surrey Regiment February 1941 to December 1941

== See also ==
- Lucknow Brigade

== Bibliography ==
- Kempton, Chris (2003b). 'Loyalty & Honour', The Indian Army September 1939 – August 1947. Vol. Part II Brigades. Milton Keynes: The Military Press. ISBN 0-85420-238-2.
