= 28th Indian Infantry Brigade =

- Active: 1941–1942
- Country: (British Raj) British India
- Allegiance: British Empire
- Branch: British Indian Army
- Type: Infantry
- Size: Brigade
- Engagements: Battle of Malaya; Battle of Jitra; Battle of Slim River; Battle of Singapore

Commanders
- Notable commanders: Brigadier W St J Carpendale; Lieutenant-Colonel WR Selby (from 24 December 1941)

The 28th Indian Infantry Brigade was an infantry brigade formation of the Indian Army during World War II. The brigade was formed in March 1941, at Secunderabad in India and assigned to the 6th Indian Infantry Division. In September 1941, the brigade was sent to Malaya. Coming under command III Indian Corps and 11th Indian Infantry Division the brigade surrendered with the rest of the Commonwealth forces during the Battle of Singapore on 15 February 1942.

== Formation ==
- 2nd Battalion, 9th Gurkha Rifles
- 2nd Battalion, 2nd Gurkha Rifles
- 2nd Battalion, 1st Gurkha Rifles to 7 January 1942
- 5th Field Artillery Regiment Royal Artillery
- 155th (Lanarkshire Yeomanry) Field Regiment, Royal Artillery (16x4.5inch Howitzers) - attached at Kampar & Slim River
- 3rd Battalion, 16th Punjab Regiment 22 to 27 December 1941 and 8 to 10 January 1942
- 3rd Battalion, 17th Dogra Regiment 1 to 13 January 1942
- 2nd Battalion, 16th Punjab Regiment 8 to 14 January 1942

== See also ==
- List of Indian Army Brigades in World War II
