= 8th Indian Infantry Brigade =

- Active: 1939–1942
- Country: (British Empire) British India
- Allegiance: British Empire
- Branch: British Indian Army
- Type: Infantry
- Size: Brigade
- Engagements: Malayan Campaign

The 8th Indian Infantry Brigade was an infantry brigade formation of the Indian Army during World War II. It was formed in September 1939, in India. In November 1940, the brigade was assigned to the 11th Indian Infantry Division. The brigade was attached to the 9th Indian Infantry Division from March 1941. The brigade took part in the Malayan Campaign and surrendered with the rest of the Allied forces in February 1942, after the Battle of Singapore.

== Formation ==
- 1st Battalion, 2nd Gurkha Rifles September 1939 to May 1940
- 2nd Battalion, Oxfordshire and Buckinghamshire Light Infantry September 1939
- 2nd Battalion, 18th Royal Garhwal Rifles September 1939 to September 1940
- 3rd Battalion, 17th Dogra Regiment September 1939 to September 1940
- 2nd Battalion, 10th Baluch Regiment October 1939 to September 1940
- 3rd Battalion, 17th Dogra Regiment October 1940 to June 1941 and October 1940 to December 1941 and January to February 1942
- 1st Battalion, 13th Frontier Force Rifles June 1941 to February 1942
- 2nd Battalion, 12th Frontier Force Regiment June 1941 to December 1941
- 4th Battalion, 19th Hyderabad Regiment December 1941
- 5th Field Regiment . Royal Artillery January 1942
- Composite Battalion 18 Royal Garhwal Rifles January to February 1942
- 1st Battalion, Bahawalpur Infantry February 1942
- 21st Mountain Battery Indian Artillery May 1941 to February 1942

== See also ==
- List of Indian Army Brigades in World War II
