= 1st Gorkha Rifles (The Malaun Regiment) =

Regiment of the Indian Army

1 Gorkha Rifles
- 1 Gorkha Regiment insignia
- Active: 1815–present
- Country: India
- Branch: Indian Army
- Type: Rifles
- Role: Light Role
- Size: 6 Battalions
- Regimental Centre: Sabathu, Himachal Pradesh
- Nickname: 1 GR
- Motto: Kayar Hunu Bhanda Marnu Ramro (Better to die than live like a coward)
- Colors: Red; faced white 1886, Rifle—Green; faced red
- March: War Cry: Jai Mahakali Ayo Gorkhali (Hail goddess Kali The Gorkhas are here)
- Anniversaries: Raising Day (24 April)
- Engagements: First Anglo-Sikh War; Indian Rebellion of 1857; Perak War; Second Afghan War; Burma; North-West Frontier; Waziristan (1894); Tirah (1897); First World War; Third Afghan War; Second World War; Indo-Pakistani War of 1965; Indo-Pakistani War of 1971
- Decorations: 1 Param Vir Chakra; 2 Victoria Cross; 7 Maha Vir Chakras; 16 Vir Chakras; 1 Kirti Chakra; 3 Shaurya Chakras; 1 Yudh Seva Medal; 22 Sena Medals

Commanders
- Colonel of the Regiment: Lt Gen Sanjeev Chauhan

Insignia
- Regimental Insignia: A pair of crossed Khukris with the numeral 1 above
- Tartan: Childers (1st Bn pipe bags and plaids); Mackenzie HLI (2nd Bn pipe bags and plaids)

1st Gorkha Rifles (The Malaun Regiment), often referred to as the 1st Gorkha Rifles, or 1 GR in abbreviation, is the most senior Gorkha Infantry regiment of the Indian Army, comprising Gurkha soldiers of Indian Gorkha or Nepalese nationality, particularly from the Magars and Gurungs communities, who are hill tribes of Nepal. It was originally formed as part of the East India Company's Bengal Army in 1815, later adopting the title of the 1st King George V's Own Gurkha Rifles (The Malaun Regiment), however, in 1947, following the partition of India, it was transferred to the Indian Army and in 1950 when India became a Republic, it was redesignated as 1st Gorkha Rifles (The Malaun Regiment). The regiment has a long history and has participated in many conflicts, including many of the colonial conflicts prior to Indian independence, as well as the First and Second World Wars. Since 1947 the regiment has also participated in a number of campaigns against Pakistan in 1965 and 1971 as well as undertaking peacekeeping duties as part of the United Nations.

The naming of The Malaun Regiment is not related to the slur "malaun". Rather, it is derived from the defeat of the Gorkhas at Malaun Fort in present day Himachal Pradesh in the Anglo-Nepalese War.

== History ==
=== Formation ===
The Gurkha War was fought between the Gorkha kings of Nepal and the British East India Company as a result of border tensions and ambitious expansionism especially into Kumaon, Garhwal and Kangra hills. Although the British East India Company's army defeated the Gorkha army led by General Amar Singh Thapa, they were nevertheless impressed by the skill and courage the Gorkhas had shown during the siege of Malaun fort in Bilaspur. As a result, during the post war settlement a clause was inserted into the Treaty of Sugauli enabling the British to recruit Gorkhas. On 24 April 1815, at Subathu, the East India Company formed a regiment with the survivors of Thapa's army calling it the First Nusseree Battalion. (Note: The designation Nusseeree, or Nasiri, means friendly or loyal.)

=== Early campaigns ===
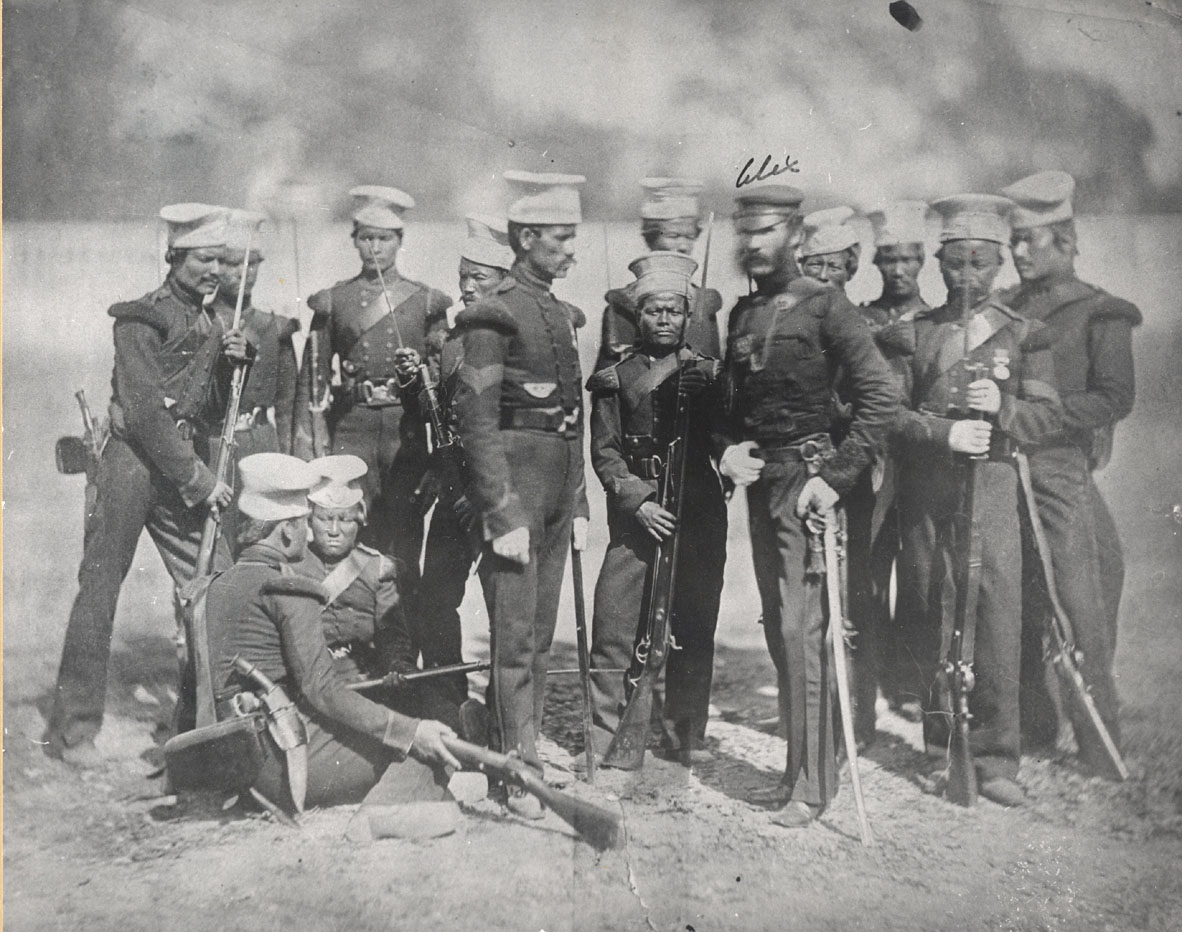
The Nusseree Battalion, a mixed rifle regiment consisting of personnel from the Magar and Khas tribes, later known as the 1st Gurkha Rifles c. 1857

The regiment soon saw its first battle when, in 1826, it took part in the Jat War where it helped in the conquest of Bharatpur, gaining it as a battle honour, the first battle honour awarded to the Gurkha units. In 1846 the First Anglo-Sikh War began and the Regiment was heavily involved in the conflict. It was awarded two battle honours for its involvement in the war; at the Battle of Aliwal which saw the Sikh forces, who had invaded British India.

The regiment experienced numerous names changes during the 1800s; one name change in 1850 saw it gain a new numerical designation to become the 66th Goorkha Regiment of Bengal Native Infantry after the original 66th had mutinied. The Regiment saw service during the Indian Rebellion of 1857 which began in 1857. The following year Lieutenant John Adam Tytler became the first Gurkha officer to be awarded the Victoria Cross (VC), receiving it for his actions against rebels at Choorpoorah.

In 1861, the regiment gained its present numerical designation when it became the 1st Goorkha Regiment. In 1875, the regiment, under the command of Colonel James Sebastian Rawlins, was sent abroad for the first time, when it took part in the effort to quell a rebellion in Malaya during the Perak War. During the conflict Captain George Nicolas Channer was awarded the Victoria Cross for his valiant actions against the Malayans. The regiment took part in the Second Afghan War in 1878 where they were part of the 2nd Infantry Brigade and won the Theatre Honour "Afghanistan 1878–80".

In 1886, the regiment became the 1st Goorkha Light Infantry and a 2nd Battalion was raised in February. In 1891, the regiment was designated a rifle regiment when it became the 1st Goorkha (Rifle) Regiment and in consequence of this the regiment's Colours were laid up. (Note: Rifle regiments by tradition did not possess Colours.) The regiment then took part in operations in Burma, the North-West Frontier and the Tirah campaign in 1897.

In 1901, the regiment's title was shortened when it became the 1st Goorkha Rifles and in 1903 its title was changed once more, this time to the 1st Goorkha Rifles (The Malaun Regiment). This title had been adopted to commemorate due to the significance of Malaun to the Regiment; it was where the British had decisively beaten the Gurkhas in 1815 during the Anglo–Gurka War and subsequently recruited them into the Nusseree battalions.

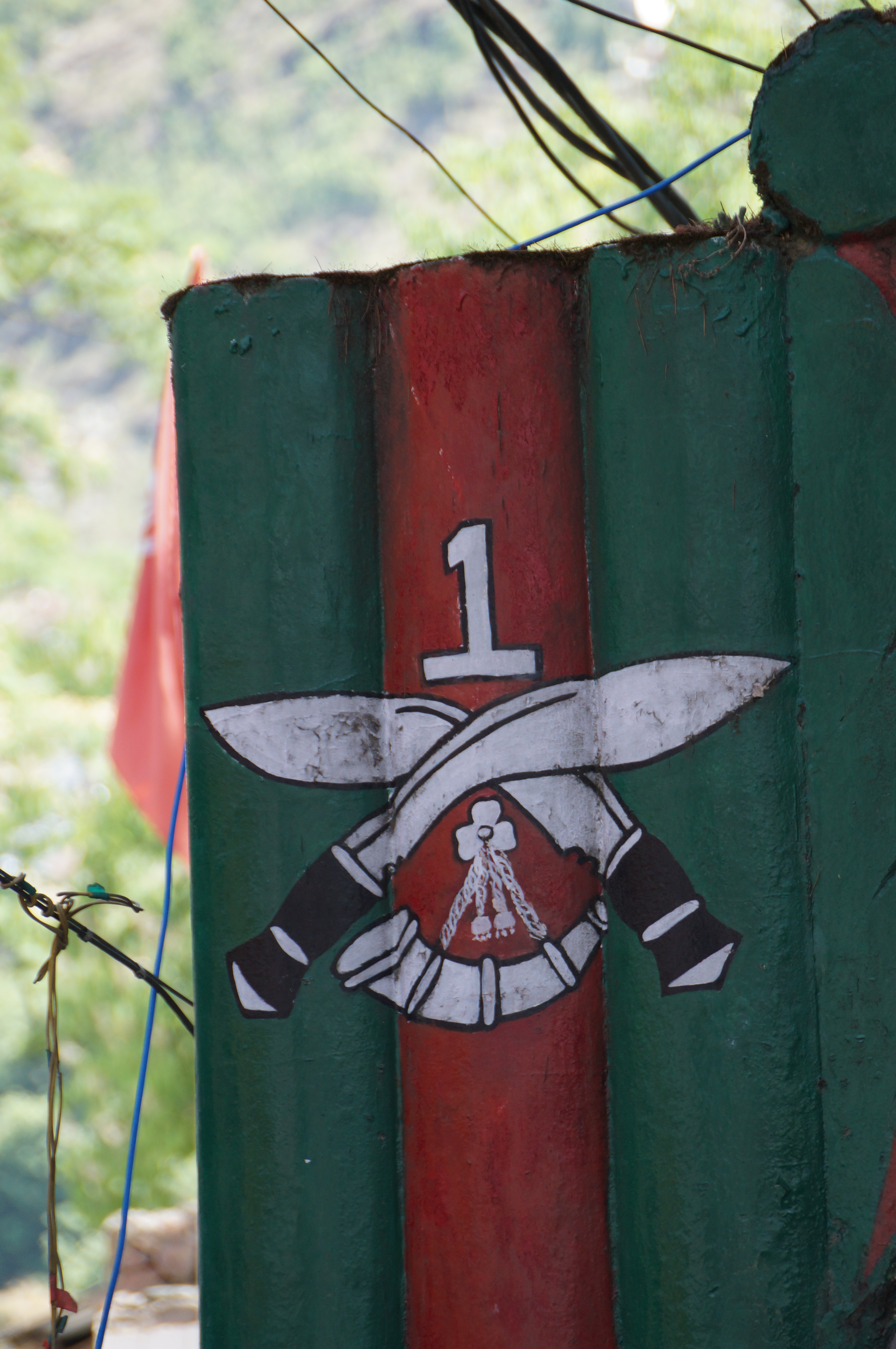

The regiment was located near Dharamsala when the 1905 Kangra earthquake struck on 4 April, killing 20,000 people. The 1st Goorkha themselves suffered over 60 fatalities.

In 1906, its title was changed to the 1st Prince of Wales's Own Goorkha Rifles (The Malaun Regiment) in honour of George, Prince of Wales (later King George V) who also became Colonel-in-Chief of the Regiment that year. In 1910, King George V ascended to the throne and in consequence the title of the regiment was changed to the 1st (King George's Own) Goorkha Rifles (The Malaun Regiment), thus maintaining the regiment's links with King George.

=== First World War ===
In August 1914, the First World War began. In December, the 1st Battalion was deployed to the Western Front in France as part of the Sirhind Indian Infantry Brigade, attached to 3rd (Lahore) Division. The 1st Battalion's first taste of trench warfare came when they were involved in the defence of Givenchy shortly after. After braving a winter in the trenches, on 10 March 1915 the 1st Battalion took part in the Battle of Neuve Chapelle which lasted until 13 March. In April, the battalion took part in the Second Battle of Ypres, fighting in the subsidiary Battle of St. Julien which began on 24 April and concluded on 4 May. Later that month the battalion took part in the Battle of Festubert and in September the Battle of Loos began, the last major engagement on the Western Front that the 1st Battalion took part in, before being withdrawn from the Western Front.

Conditions on the Western Front were very different to those that the regiment had been used to in the sub-continent and they, along with the rest of the Indian Army troops deployed, suffered badly during the winter months. As a result, in December 1915 it was decided that the infantry units of the Indian Corps would be withdrawn from France and sent to other theatres. As a result, the 1st Battalion, along with the rest of the 3rd Division, was sent to Mesopotamia to take part in the campaign against the Ottomans which had begun in 1914. The Sirhind Brigade was given a numerical designation, the 8th Brigade. In 1916, the 1st Gurkhas took part in a number of attempts, including the attack on Dujaila Redoubt in March, to relieve Kut-al-Amara, which had been besieged by the Ottomans since 7 December 1915. Those attempts, however, failed and Kut remained under siege until it surrendered to the Ottomans on 29 April 1916.

Following this the regiment took part in the Allied offensive against the Ottomans later that year; this included the effort to recapture Kut, begun in December, which was recaptured in February 1917 and the capital Baghdad which was taken the following month. The 1st Battalion was later moved to Palestine in early 1918. It was involved in the effective Allied offensive against the Ottomans in September, the Battle of Megiddo, and also saw action at the Sharon.

Elsewhere, the 2nd Battalion saw service in the North-West Frontier of India, gaining the Battle Honour "North-West Frontier 1915–17" in the process. In 1917 a 3rd Battalion was raised for home service in India.

During the period that they had served on the Western Front in France the men of the 1st Gurkhas had found the conditions quite different from those that they were used to, however, they acquitted themselves commendably, performing with distinction in the many battles they took part in, proving the capability of the Gurkhas once more. The war formally ended on 11 November 1918 with the signing of the Armistice. The regiment was awarded eleven Battle Honours and four Theatre Honours during the war.

=== Inter war years ===
In 1919, the 1st and 2nd Battalions saw service during the brief Third Afghan War for which they gained the Theatre Honour "Afghanistan 1919". In 1921, the 3rd Battalion was disbanded. After this the Regiment participated in a number of campaigns on the North-West Frontier, serving mainly in Waziristan.

In 1937, the regiment's name was altered slightly when it became the 1st King George V's Own Gurkha Rifles (The Malaun Regiment); the only change being the addition of a V.

=== Second World War ===
In September 1939, the Second World War commenced between the UK and its allies against Germany. In December 1941, the Japanese entered the war when it launched a surprise attack on Pearl Harbor and launched a number of swift invasions of British and other countries territories. During the course of the war the regiment raised a further three battalions—the 3rd in 1940, the 4th in 1941 and the 5th in 1942—the regiment saw much service in the war but most notably in Malaya and Burma.

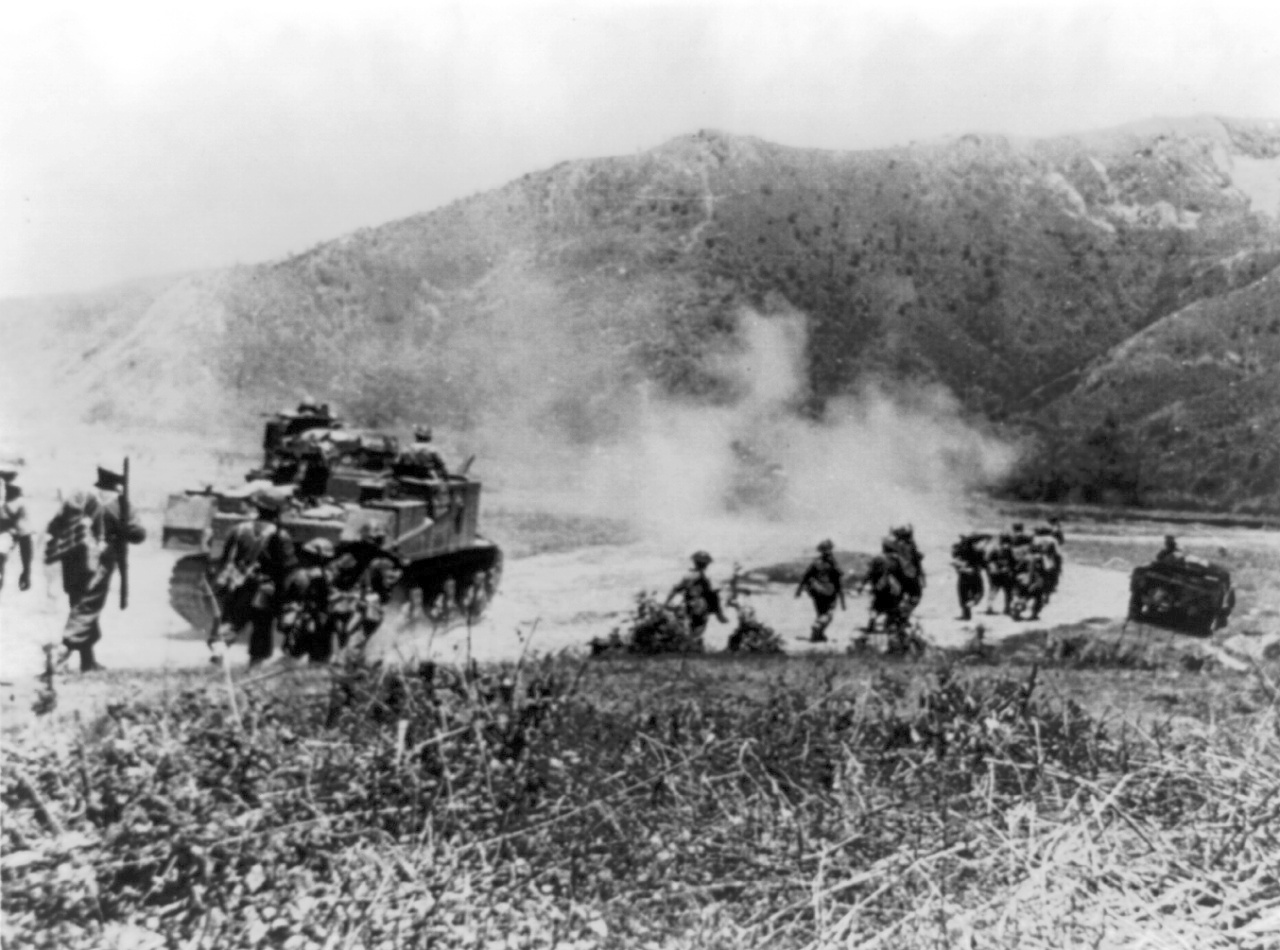
Gurkhas advancing with tanks on the Imphal–Kohima road, March–July 1944

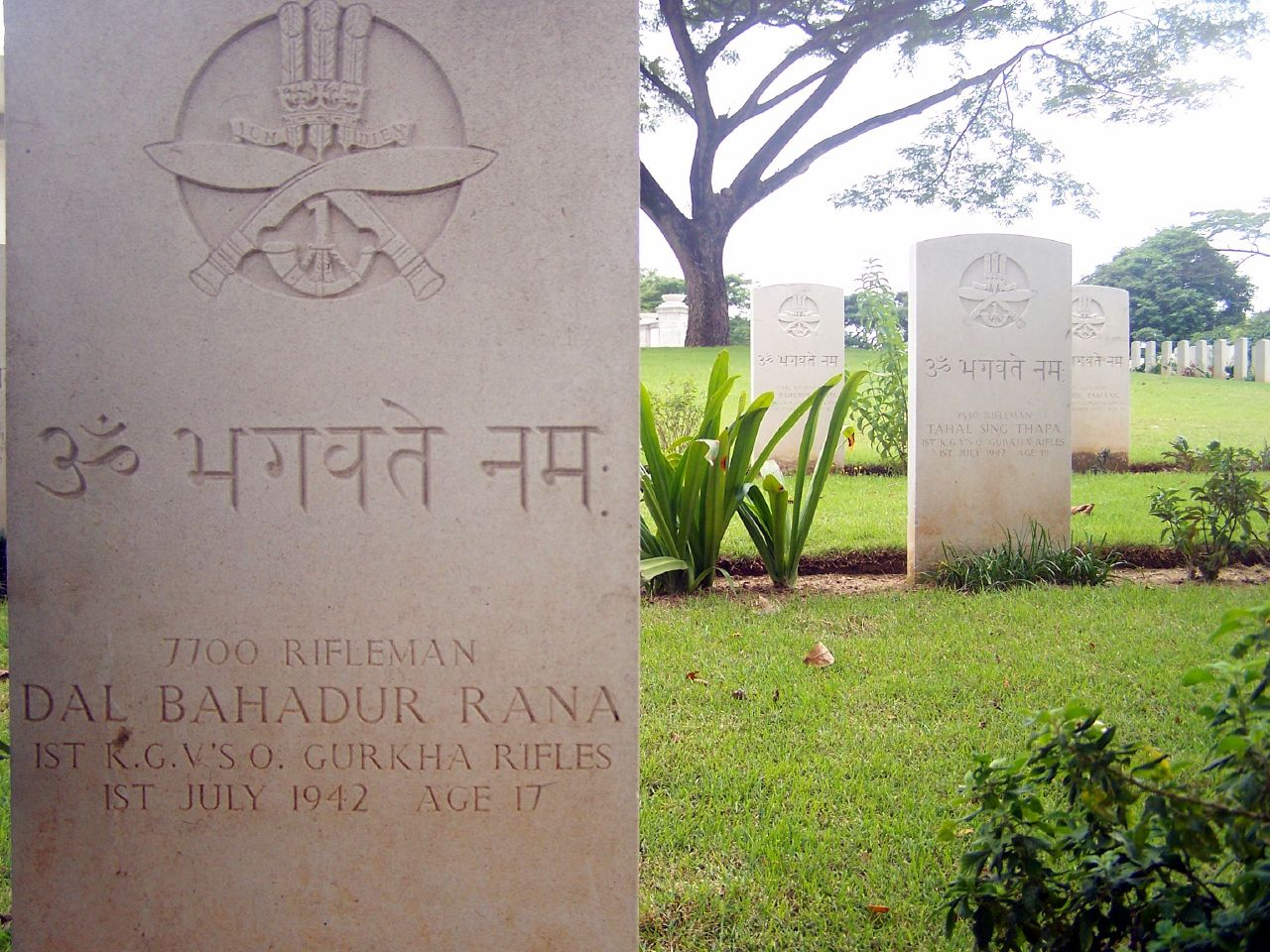
Gurkha graves in military cemetery, Singapore

The regiment saw ferocious fighting during the Japanese invasion of Malaya; the 2nd Battalion, part of the 28th Brigade, stook part in the fighting at Jitra where it was forced to hastily retreat after taking part in the initial resistance on the Asun and being isolated and confronted by overwhelming Japanese forces which included tanks. The 2nd Battalion was in action a few weeks later at Kampar where they successfully held off superior forces. Within a few days they were again in action but were out-numbered and sustained heavy casualties during the engagement at the Slim River Bridge on 7 January. The Allies withdrew from Malaya, to Singapore, by January 1942. The Japanese subsequently launched an invasion of Singapore and bitter fighting ensued; Singapore, which had once been perceived as impregnable, fell on 15 February 1942 with 130,000 British, Australian and Empire troops, including men of the 2nd Battalion, taken prisoner by the Japanese.

In Burma, a similar situation occurred, the Allies—having come under intense attacks from the Japanese who had begun their offensive in December—had to commence a retreat to India from February 1942 which was completed in May. Later, the battalions of the Regiment saw heavy fighting again in 1944 in the Arakan campaign and during the Japanese offensive against north-east India where two important battles, Kohima and Imphal, took place from March to June 1944. Imphal was besieged by the Japanese until the Allies achieved a decisive victory at Kohima in June and the Japanese fled back into Burma. The Regiment subsequently took part in the successful Allied offensive into Burma and on 3 May 1945 the Burmese capital Rangoon was liberated by British forces. There were still Japanese forces present in Burma but the fight against the Japanese was now ostensibly a mopping up operation.

The war concluded with the formal surrender of Japan on 2 September 1945 on the deck of the USS Missouri in Tokyo Bay; the Allies had prevailed after nearly six years of fighting. In French Indochina that same day the Viet Minh, led by Ho Chi Minh, declared their independence from France as the Democratic Republic of Vietnam. Shortly afterwards the British began to send units of the 20th Indian Infantry Division, which the 1st and 3rd Battalions were part of, to occupy the south of the country while the Nationalist Chinese occupied the north; the deployment was completed by October.

The force was intended to disarm the Japanese forces and help in their repatriation back to Japan. The force, however, soon became embroiled in the fight against the Viet Minh and was soon helping in the restoration of French-control over the country. The British were, due to a lack of sufficient manpower, ironically forced to have the Japanese forces working alongside their own in Indochina in order to maintain peace and stability. The operations against the Viet Minh gradually became more intense and after substantial French reinforcements arrived the British and Indian forces departed by May 1946, and the First Indochina War would begin shortly afterwards.

On 25 October, a Japanese patrol captured a Russian adviser near Thủ Dầu Một, in an incident that constitutes the only known evidence of direct Soviet involvement in the 1945–1946 war. He was handed over to Lieutenant-Colonel Cyril Jarvis, commander of the 1/1 Gurkha Rifles. Jarvis made several attempts at interrogation, but it was fruitless, so the intruder was handed over to the Sûreté, the French criminal investigation department (equivalent to the CID). From there he disappeared from the annals of history.

From September 1945 the 7th Indian Infantry Division, which the 4th Battalion was part of, was deployed to Siam (now Thailand) as part of an occupation force sent there to disarm the large Japanese forces present. The Battalion subsequently moved to Malaya in 1946 and then onto India.

In 1946, the 2nd Battalion, having been captured in Malaya in 1942, was reconstituted from personnel taken from the 3rd Battalion, which subsequently was demobilised along with the 4th and 5th Battalions.

=== Post Independence ===
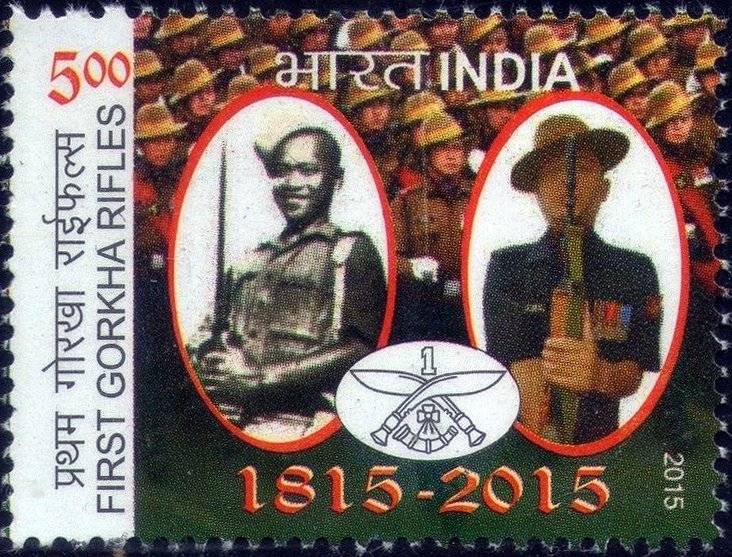
1st Gorkha Rifles Bicentenary postal stamp issued in 2015

In 1947 an agreement, known as the Tripartite Agreement between India, Nepal and the United Kingdom was negotiated in order to determine what would happen to the Gurkhas upon the formalisation of India's Independence. As a result of this agreement it was decided that of the pre-war Gurkha regiments, four would be transferred to the British Army, while six—one of which was the 1st Gurkhas—would become part of the newly independent Indian Army.

Despite India achieving its independence, the regiment retained its full designation until 1950 when it became the 1st Gorkha Rifles (The Malaun Regiment), also adopting the Indian spelling of Gurkha, following India's transition to a republic. Over time the wartime battalions that had been disbanded in 1946 were re-raised, so that by 1965 the Regiment consisted of five battalions once more. (Note: The 3rd Battalion was re-raised in 1959, the 4th in 1963 and the 5th in 1965.)

In 1961, Captain Gurbachan Singh Salaria received the posthumous Param Vir Chakra (PVC), India's highest military honour, for his actions in the Congo when the 3rd Battalion, of which he was part, was on United Nations service.

==== Colonel of the Regiment ====
Lionel Protip Sen became the Colonel of the 1st Gorkha Rifles on 23 December 1949. Siri Kanth Korla served as the Colonel of the 1st Gorkha Rifles, over 1965-75.

==== 6th Battalion ====
On 1 April 2016, a new battalion with about 700 soldiers was raised as the 6th Battalion, 1st Gorkha Rifles (6/1GR); it was the first time in 50 years that a new Gorkha battalion had been formed. The new battalion, christened "Kanchi Paltan", was raised at Sabathu in the Shivalik foothills near Shimla, which is the location of the 14 Gorkha Training Centre. It is the first Gorkha battalion comprising only locally domiciled Gurkhas. The ratio between Nepali Gurkhas and Indian-resident Gurkhas in the army's seven Gurkha regiments had typically been around 70:30. The announcement about the raising of this battalion was made by Lt Gen Ravi Thodge, then Master General of Ordnance and Colonel of the Regiment, in October 2015 during the grand celebrations of the reunion and bicentenary of the regiment.

== Units ==
- 1st Battalion
- 2nd Battalion
- 3rd Battalion (Param Vir Chakra Paltan)
- 4th Battalion
- 5th Battalion
- 6th Battalion

== Battle honours ==
- Bharatpur, Aliwal, Sobraon, Afghanistan 1878–80, Tirah, Punjab Frontier;
- First World War: Givenchy 1914, Neuve Chapelle, Ypres 1915, St. Julien, Festubert 1915, Loos, France and Flanders 1914–15, Megiddo, Sharon, Palestine 1918, Tigris 1916, Kut al Amara 1917, Baghdad, Mesopotamia 1916–18;
- N.W. Frontier India 1915–17, Afghanistan 1919;
- Second World War: Jitra, Kampar, Malaya 1941–42, Shenam Pass, Bishenpur, Ukhrul, Myinmu Bridgehead, Kyaukse 1945, Burma 1942–45;
- Post Independence: Kalidhar, Jammu and Kashmir 1965, Darsana, East Pakistan 1971.

== Valour awards ==
Pre-Independence

- Victoria Cross
  - John Adam Tytler
  - George Nicolas Channer

Post Independence

- Param Vir Chakra
  - Capt Gurbachan Singh Salaria
- Maha Vir Chakra
  - Naik M Thapa
  - Lance Naik Ran Bahadur Gurung
  - Rifleman Pati Ram Gurung
- Kirti Chakra
  - Havaldar Prem Bahadur Reshmi Magar (Posthumous)
- Shaurya Chakra
  - Rifleman Tej Bahadur Gurung

== Notes ==
Footnotes

Citations
