= British Battalion (Malaya 1941) =

The British Battalion was an ad hoc formation created on 20 December 1941 during the Battle of Malaya.

It was amalgamated from two regular British Army battalions

- 2nd Bn, East Surrey Regiment under Lieut-Col. G E Swinton MC and
- 1st Bn, The Leicestershire Regiment under Lieut-Col. Charles Esmond Morrison, OBE, MC

Both battalions suffered heavy casualties in North West Malaya during the early stages of the Japanese invasion so it was decided to amalgamate the two battalions.

The British Battalion was commanded by Lieut-Col. Morrison; Lieut-Col. Swinton was badly wounded during the Battle of Jitra. The battalion fought with great courage, taking many casualties and earning much respect from other units. They were involved in fierce fighting during the Battle of Kampar (30 December 1941 – 2 January 1942), before joining in the fighting retreat back to Singapore. The Battalion was also involved in the short but fierce battle for Singapore. They surrendered to the Japanese along with other units of the British Army under General Arthur Percival in February 1942. Many of the British battalion died in Japanese P.O.W. camps. Of the estimated 500 soldiers at the amalgamation, barely 130 survived the war
