= Battle of Gurun =

- Part of the Battle of Malaya, World War II
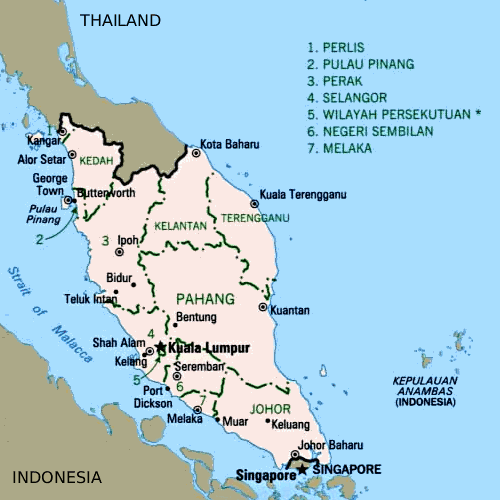
- Map of the Malayan Peninsula. Gurun is situated in the state of Kedah (top left)
Date	14–16 December 1941
Location	Gurun, Kedah, Malaya
Result	Japanese victory

Belligerents
(British Raj) 11th Indian Division	(Empire of Japan) 5th Infantry Division

Commanders and leaders
(United Kingdom) David Murray-Lyon	(Empire of Japan) Takuma Nishimura

The Battle of Gurun was a minor engagement between the Japanese and Commonwealth forces during the Malayan Campaign of the Second World War. The battle occurred when the 11th Indian Division attempted to slow down the Japanese advance after the disastrous Battle of Jitra at a position 3 miles north of the village of Gurun.

== Background ==
General Percival gave permission to Major-General Murray-Lyon to withdraw from the Jitra position after just a few days of fighting. Murray-Lyon believed he was under attack from far greater forces than he actually was and also believed that his line of retreat was threatened by the failure of Krohcol to stop the Japanese advance from Patani. Murray-Lyon was given permission to withdraw 30 mi (48 km) south to unprepared positions at Gurun. The terrain at Gurun offered a natural defensive obstacle for the British to use in the hope of stopping the Japanese advance.

The retreat from Jitra, though, was a disorganised shambles that cost the division more casualties than they had incurred during the Battle of Jitra itself. Many units were left behind at Jitra when the order to withdraw did not reach them, but many more men and whole platoons and companies were lost trying to cross the Bata River and in the broken terrain south of Jitra. Some of these men would eventually make it back to British lines, many more were captured or killed.
