= David Murray-Lyon =

Officer in the British Indian Army

Major-General David Murray-Lyon DSO* MC
- Born: 14 August 1890; Glendale, Northumberland, England
- Died: 4 February 1975 (aged 84)
- Military career
- Allegiance: United Kingdom
- Branch: British Army (1908–1927); British Indian Army (1927–1942)
- Service years: 1908–1942
- Rank: Major-General
- Service number: 4700
- Units: Royal Garrison Artillery; King's Own Scottish Borderers; Highland Light Infantry; 4th Prince of Wales's Own Gurkha Rifles
- Commands: 11th Indian Infantry Division (1940–1941); Zhob Brigade (1940); 2nd Battalion, 4th Prince of Wales's Own Gurkha Rifles (1936–1939); 5th Battalion, Royal Irish Regiment (1919); 5th Battalion, Highland Light Infantry (1919); 1st/5th Battalion, Royal Scots Fusiliers (1918–1919); 2nd Battalion, Highland Light Infantry (1918)
- Conflicts: First World War; North-West Frontier; Second World War
- Awards: Distinguished Service Order & Bar; Military Cross; Mentioned in despatches (5)

Major-General David Murray Murray-Lyon, DSO & Bar, MC (14 August 1890 – 4 February 1975) was an officer in the British Indian Army. His final appointment was as the General Officer Commanding (GOC) of the 11th Indian Infantry Division in Malaya until he was relieved of his duty by Lieutenant General Arthur Percival.

== Early life ==
Murray-Lyon was born in Glendale, Northumberland, on 14 August 1890, the eldest son of Dr Thomas Malcolm Lyon, and a grandson of David Murray Lyon of Ayr, Scotland. He married Meredith Napier in 1916, they had two daughters and one son.

== Military service ==
Murray-Lyon was commissioned as a second lieutenant in the Royal Garrison Artillery of the Territorial Force, the British Army's part-time reserve force, in 1908. He transferred to the 3rd Battalion (Depot), King's Own Scottish Borderers, as part of the reserve of officers, in 1910. In 1911 Murray-Lyon became a regular army officer and was transferred to the 1st Battalion, Highland Light Infantry based in Lucknow, India.

=== First World War ===
After the outbreak of the First World War in the summer of 1914, many British regiments based around the world returned to join the fighting on the Western Front, the Highland Light Infantry returned in late 1914 and was in the trenches by the beginning of 1915. During the battles of 1915, Murray-Lyon was promoted to temporary captain and wounded twice and was mentioned in despatches and received the Military Cross for his actions in Flanders. After recovering from his wounds, he was based in England during 1916 as a major and adjutant of the 4th Battalion.

Murray-Lyon returned to France in December 1916 as second-in-command of the 2nd Battalion. He remained in the front lines throughout 1916 and most of 1917 with this battalion. In November 1917 he was given command of a battalion of the King's Regiment (Liverpool) . While in command of this battalion, he was awarded the Distinguished Service Order (DSO) for his actions during an attack on his battalion trenches at Mœuvres, the citation read:

For conspicuous gallantry and devotion to duty. When the enemy attacked and penetrated the line after intense fighting and continual bombing attacks, by his courage and personal example he succeeded in driving them out and held his position against further heavy attacks with splendid coolness and determination.

Between 1917 and 1918 he was mentioned in despatches three times for his actions as a battalion commander. In April 1918 he was promoted to temporary lieutenant colonel and took command of the 2nd Battalion of the Highland Light Infantry. In June 1918 he was given command of the 1st/15th Battalion, Royal Scots Fusiliers. He commanded this battalion through the rest of the war.

=== Interbellum ===
Due to the downsizing of the British Army after the First World War, Murray-Lyon, along with many other officers, found commands few and far between and had their rank reduced, so Murray-Lyon became a major again. He returned to the Highland Light Infantry and became adjutant of the 6th Battalion in 1920 and later with the 2nd Battalion he held various posts in their advance parties and auxiliary forces based in Egypt and India. In 1927 he transferred across to the British Indian Army and in 1932 he was promoted to lieutenant colonel and took command of the 2nd Battalion, 4th Prince of Wales's Own Gurkha Rifles.

In 1936 during fighting in Waziristan on the North West Frontier, Murray-Lyon received a Bar to his DSO. He commanded the 2/4th Gurkha Rifles until 1939, when he became the liaison officer for the Indian Army in Scotland .

== Second World War ==
After the outbreak of the Second World War, Murray-Lyon returned to India and was given command of the Zhob Brigade, a regionally based command, in 1940. In October 1940, he was given command of the newly formed 11th Indian Division .

=== Malaya ===
When the Japanese attacked Pearl Harbor on 7 December 1941, they had already sent an invasion force to attack the British forces based in Malaya. Murray-Lyon's 11th Indian Division was based in the north of Malaya, focused on the border with Thailand. Although the British Army in Malaya was expecting the Japanese invasion and had even prepared defences and plans for counterattacks, they still were overconfident and massively ill-prepared to face the highly disciplined, organised and battle experienced Japanese Army. Murray-Lyon's division looked good on paper, but in reality it consisted of two regular British Army battalions (The Leicestershire Regiment and the East Surrey Regiment), the backbone of the division, four newly raised and half-trained Indian Army battalions and three Gurkha battalions, one of which consisted of 18-year-olds who had only recently arrived in Malaya. There were no tanks in the entire peninsula and a chronic shortage of aircraft. With this Murray-Lyon faced the Japanese attacks that came through southern Thailand in early December 1941.

The Japanese assaulted Murray-Lyon's positions with incredible speed. Tanks, aircraft and infantry attacked in waves and constantly out-flanked any resistance. Before long the 11th Division was in full retreat, with the Japanese advancing so rapidly that their reconnaissance motorcyclists were often driving through the retreating columns. On one occasion Murray-Lyon was fast enough to draw his service revolver and shoot one off his motorcycle.

Unfortunately for Murray-Lyon, the true extent of the ill-prepared defences of Malaya and the rapid mobility of the Japanese Army had not been discovered by the British commanders in Singapore, and as a result, he was dismissed from his command by Lieutenant General Arthur Percival on 23 December 1941.

== Sources ==
- 'Singapore Burning', Colin Smith. Penguin Books 2006. England. ISBN 978-0-14-101036-6

Military offices
| Preceded by New post | GOC 11th Indian Infantry Division; 1940−1941 | Succeeded by Billy Key |
