= Battle of Jitra =

Battle of the Malayan Campaign in World War II

- Part of the Malayan Campaign, World War II
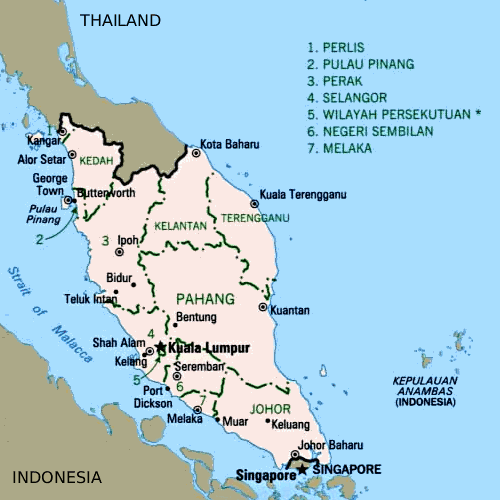
- Map of the Malayan Peninsula. Jitra is situated in the state of Kedah (top left).
Date	10–13 December 1941
Location	Jitra, Malaya 06°16′05″N 100°25′18″E
Result	Japanese victory

Belligerents
British Empire: India	Japan

Commanders and leaders
(United Kingdom) David Murray-Lyon	(Empire of Japan) Takurō Matsui

Units involved
(British Raj) 11th Indian Division	(Empire of Japan) 5th Infantry Division

Casualties and losses
26+ killed 350+ killed	6 tanks destroyed 1+ tank damaged 27 killed 83 wounded

The Battle of Jitra was fought between the invading Japanese and Allied forces during the Malayan Campaign of the Second World War, from 11–13 December 1941. The British defeat compelled Arthur Percival to order all Allied aircraft stationed in Malaya to withdraw to Singapore.

== Background ==
Allied defences at Jitra were not complete when the Pacific War broke out. Barbed wire lines had been erected and some anti-tank mines laid but heavy rains had flooded the shallow trenches and gun pits. Many of the field telephone cables laid across the waterlogged ground also failed to work, resulting in a lack of communication during the battle.

Two brigades of Major General David Murray-Lyon's 11th Indian Division held the front line. On the right was the 15th Indian Infantry Brigade, composed of 1st Battalion The Leicestershire Regiment, the 1st Bn 14th Punjab Regiment and the 2nd Bn 9th Jats; on the left was the 6th Indian Infantry Brigade, composed of the 2nd Bn East Surrey Regiment, the 1st Bn 8th and 2nd Bn 16th Punjab Regiments. Batteries from the 155th Field Regiment, the 22nd Mountain Regiment and the 80th Anti-tank Regiment provided the artillery support. The 28th Indian Infantry Brigade, consisting of three Gurkha battalions was placed in divisional reserve.

The British front line was as long as 14 mi (23 km), stretching across both roads and a railway and far beyond on either side, from the jungle-clad hills on the right, via flooded rice fields and a rubber tree estate to a tidal mangrove swamp on the left.

After Operation Matador—a forestalling attack into Thailand—was cancelled, the 11th Indian Division moved back to defensive positions around Jitra. The Jitra position was still in an extremely poor condition on 8 December 1941 and Murray-Lyon needed time to complete the defences. Malaya Command came up with a secondary plan to delay the Japanese; three mini-Matadors (Krohcol, Laycol and an armoured train), that would hopefully keep the Japanese away from Jitra long enough for Murray-Lyon to get his defences in shape. Krohcol invaded Thailand from south-east of Jitra and was partially successful in delaying the Japanese but unsuccessful in its main objective. The other two columns, Laycol and the armoured train operated from north of the Jitra position. (see also Japanese invasion of Thailand)

== Prelude ==
=== 9 December ===
After the Japanese invasion of Thailand with the landings at Singora and Patani on 8 December 1941, they attacked toward north-west Malaya. To help delay the Japanese, three columns were dispatched from Malaya. In front of the 11th Indian Division, two columns were sent out. The first was an armoured train manned by a platoon from the 2/16th Punjab, which was sent to Perlis (almost halfway to Singora) where it blew up a railway bridge and then withdrew to Malaya.

Laycol, the second column consisted of 200 truck-borne soldiers from the 1/8th Punjab Regiment, under Major Eric Robert Andrews, supported by a couple of 2-pounder anti-tank guns of 273 Battery, 80th Anti-Tank Regiment and two sections of engineers. Laycol advanced up the Trunk Road from Jitra to 10 mi (16 km) across the Thai border at the town of Ban Sadao. Laycol had just completed their defensive positions at 21:00 on 9 December when the vanguard of the Japanese 5th Division—about 500 men of the 5th Division Reconnaissance Regiment and 1st Tank Regiment under Lieutenant Colonel Saeki—came down the Trunk Road with lights blazing. The Laycol anti-tank guns destroyed two tanks and damaged a third, before Laycol packed up and headed back to the 1/14th Punjab positions at Changlun, 6 mi (9.7 km) south of the border. When Laycol crossed the border they destroyed the bridge and parts of the road behind them, hoping to delay the Japanese further.

== Battle ==
=== 10–11 December ===
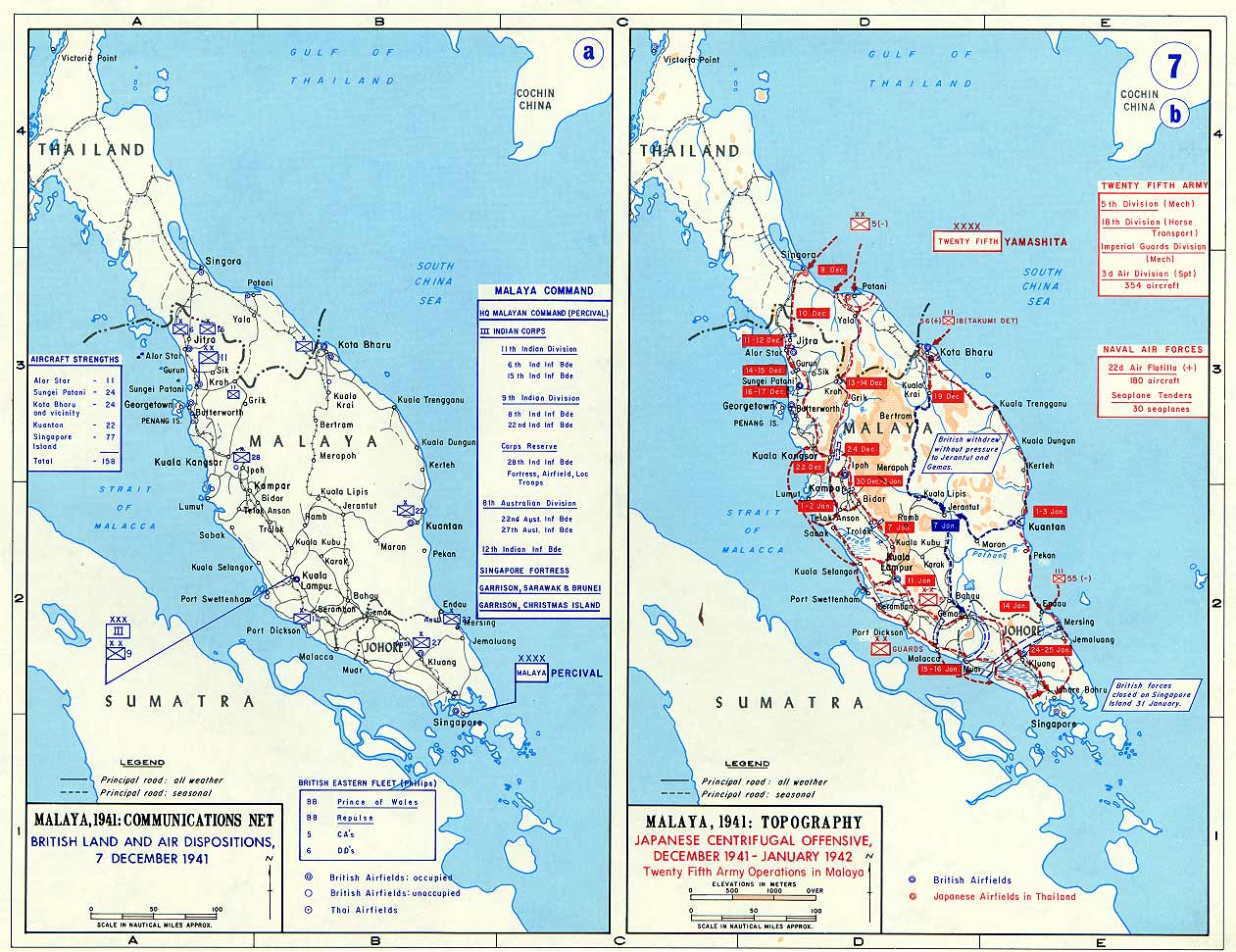
Map: Malaya, 1941–1942

Major General Murray-Lyon—realising that the positions at Jitra were still not ready—ordered Brigadier K. A. Garrett to take the 1/14th Punjab and the 2/1st Gurkha Rifles to positions on the Trunk Road north of Jitra, in an attempt to delay the Japanese advance until 12 December. Garrett placed the 1/14th Punjab (Lt.Col. James Fitzpatrick) at Changlun, 6 mi (9.7 km) from the Thai border and the 2/1st Gurkhas (Lt.Col. Jack Fulton) at the village of Asun (Kampung Asun) just a few miles north of Jitra.

==== Changlun ====
Lieutenant-Colonel Fitzpatrick's 1/14th Punjab—supported by the 4th Mountain battery (from 22 Mountain Regiment, IA), a section of 2-pounder anti-tank guns (from 2nd Battery, 80th Anti-Tank Regiment) and a company of engineers—separated into two strong ambush positions; one north of Changlun and one south of the village. The battalion was in position by early evening of 10 December. Lieutenant-Colonel Saiki's vanguard had completed repairs on the road and bridge unopposed by the afternoon and had started heading down the Trunk Road toward the 1/14th Punjabs position at Changlun. At about 21:00 on 10 December, Saeki's first two tanks to reach the ambush position north of Changlun were destroyed by the anti-tank guns and the Punjabis inflicted more casualties on the Japanese supporting infantry, before pulling out and retreating south of Changlun. It was early morning on 11 December before the Japanese caught up with the 1/14th Punjabs at their next ambush position. In full daylight, Saeki's men were able to send a flanking party around the Punjabs' position forcing them to withdraw before they were cut off. Fitzpatrick decided to withdraw his mostly intact battalion back to the Gurkha's position at Asun.

At this point in the battle, Murray-Lyon arrived at Fitzpatrick's headquarters and ordered him to set up another ambush north of Asun. Murray-Lyon, Garrett, Fitzpatrick and all four of his company commanders then drove south to see the new ambush site, leaving the 1/14th Punjab to pack up and join them. By early afternoon, it had started to rain heavily, reducing visibility to a few feet. Half loaded onto their transport and facing the wrong way, the 1/14th Punjab were surprised by a number of Japanese tanks appearing out of the rain and driving into the middle of the battalion. Saeki's tanks scattered the battalion with only 270 Punjabis managing to make their way back to British lines.

The Japanese rapidly drove through the destroyed battalion and headed toward Asun. Fitzpatrick—a couple of miles down the Trunk Road—learned of the disaster from the few survivors racing toward Asun. Fitzpatrick and the few men with him attempted to build a roadblock but he was severely wounded when the Japanese tanks reached him. Garrett gathered the 270-odd survivors and escaped south. By early evening on 11 December, Saeki's column had reached the Gurkhas at Asun.

==== Asun ====
Lieutenant-Colonel Jack Fulton's 2/1st Gurkhas were positioned on the south bank of a fast-flowing stream, just to the north of Asun. Unlike the Punjabs, the Gurkhas had no anti-tank guns but engineers had placed demolition charges on the road bridge. The arrival of the survivors of the 1/14th Punjab gave a few minutes warning to the Gurkhas who attempted to blow the bridge, but the heavy rain may have damaged the charges. As the first of Saeki's tanks arrived, Havildar Manbahadur Gurung, using a Boys anti-tank rifle managed to stop the first two tanks on the bridge, blocking it. Saeki's infantry moved swiftly across the stream on either flank, supported by heavy mortar and machine gun fire. The mostly young and inexperienced Gurkhas soon broke and scattered. By 19:00 on 11 December, the small Japanese force had broken through the Gurkas. Most of the 2/1st Gurkhas were captured, but Fulton managed to save around 200 of the 550 men.

=== Jitra ===
After the destruction of the two battalions north of Jitra, the Saeki Detachment sped down the main Trunk Road to the 11th Indian Division defensive line at Jitra. Murray-Lyon had placed the majority of his two brigades to the east and west of Jitra with a four battalion front to face any attack. The 6th Indian Brigade covered the west of Jitra following the line of the Jitra River. The 2/16th Punjab on the extreme left flank and the 2nd East Surrey Regiment closer to Jitra. The 1/8th Punjab—minus the two companies that formed Laycol—were covering the Kodiang road through the state of Perlis at Tanjong Iman. On 10 December, the 1/8th Punjab were withdrawn from Perlis, demolishing bridges as they retreated. At the same time as Garrett's force on the Singora Road was being destroyed by Saeki, a premature demolition of a bridge on the Kodiang road left a large number of the 1/8th Punjab stranded on the wrong side of a river.

The 15th Indian Brigade (now under the command of Brigadier Carpendale) covered the main Trunk Road at Jitra. The 1st Leicestershire Regiment were covering the road and town north of the Jitra River with the 2/9th Jat Regiment on the east flank. The 2/2nd Gurkhas covered the divisional area behind the Leicesters and Jats positions, while the remaining Gurkha battalion (2/9th Gurkhas) protected the 11th Indian Divisions line of retreat. By late afternoon of 11 December, Murray-Lyon had lost the better part of three battalions and was now without any reserve units to commit to the main battle.

==== 11–13 December ====
With the survivors of Garrett's two battalions streaming through the 11th Indian Division and his line of retreat threatened by the Japanese advance south of Jitra at Kroh, Murray-Lyon requested permission from Malaya Command to retire from Jitra to a position he had already selected about 30 mi (48 km) south at Gurun. It was a natural stronghold, though it had not been fortified. General Arthur Percival refused, fearing that such an early and long retreat would have a demoralising effect on the troops and civilian population. Murray-Lyon was told that the battle must be fought out at Jitra.

At 20:30 on 11 December, Saeki's advance guard overran a forward patrol of the 1st Leicesters but was held up by an improvised roadblock until dawn of 12 December. Saeki—believing he was still attacking small British delaying forces—launched his men into a three-hour attack on the Leicesters and Jat positions without success. By midday of 12 December, Saeki realised he was fighting against the main 11th Indian Division positions. General Kawamura (commanding the Imperial Japanese Army's 9th Brigade) placed the 11th and 41st Infantry Regiments in readiness to resume the attack that night. Saeki's advance guard impulsively attacked again, this time into D Company of the 2/9th Jats resulting in a wedge being driven between the Leicesters and Jats and D Company was practically cut off. The Leicester attempt to close the gap during the afternoon was a costly failure. Lt.Col R. C. S. Bates led two of his companies from the 1/8th Punjab in an attack on the wedge; Bates with two officers and twenty-three men were killed. The Jats D Company, running out of ammunition, was overrun soon after. At the same time Lt.Col C. K. Tester, the 2/9th Jats commander, had lost contact with A Company on the right flank.

At 19:30 on 12 December, Murray-Lyon again sought leave to fall back to the position at Gurun. General Percival finally agreed and Murray-Lyon was given permission to withdraw at his own discretion. The withdrawal from Jitra on the night of 12/13 December was when the 11th Indian Division incurred most of its casualties. Due to extremely poor communications, Murray-Lyon's orders for withdrawal failed to reach many of his forward companies who were in their positions at daylight of 13 December. At midnight on 13 December, a Japanese effort to rush the single bridge over the River Bata was repulsed by the 2/2nd Gurkha Rifles. Two hours later, the bridge was blown and the battalion withdrew through a rearguard formed by the 2/9th Gurkha Rifles, who fought another fierce engagement before withdrawing at 04:30; by noon the British had broken away. Murray-Lyon was to try to hold North Kedah, block Japanese tanks on good natural obstacles and to dispose his forces in depth on the two parallel north–south roads which traversed the rice-growing area, to give greater scope to his artillery. At 22:00, the 11th Indian Division were ordered to withdraw to the south bank of the River Kedah at Alor Star, beginning at midnight.

== Aftermath ==
The Battle of Jitra and the retreat to Gurun had cost the 11th Indian Division heavily in manpower and strength as an effective fighting force. The division had lost one brigade commander wounded (Garrett), one battalion commander killed (Bates) and another captured (Fitzpatrick). The division had lost the equivalent of nearly three battalions of infantry and was in no condition to face another Japanese assault without reinforcements, reorganisation and rest. After 15 hours of bitter combat, the Japanese 5th Division had captured Jitra and with it a large quantity of Allied supplies in the area. Around that same time, Imperial Japanese Navy aircraft conducted massive air raids on Penang, killing more than 2,000 civilians. After the destruction of most of the Allied aircraft at Alor Star, General Percival ordered that until reinforcements arrive, all aircraft will only be used in the defence of Singapore and for the protection of supply convoys moving north into Malaya. Murray-Lyon was relieved of command on 23 December.

This withdrawal would have been difficult under the most favourable conditions. With the troops tired, units mixed as the result of the fighting, communications broken and the night dark, it was inevitable that orders should be delayed and that in some cases they should never reach the addressees. This is what in fact occurred. Some units and sub-units withdrew without incident. Others, finding themselves unable to use the only road, had to make their way as best they could across country. On the left flank, there were no roads, so some parties reached the coast and, taking boats, rejoined farther south. Some, again, were still in position the following morning. The fact is that the withdrawal, necessary as it may have been, was too fast and too complicated for disorganised and exhausted troops, whose disorganisation and exhaustion it only increased.

— Percival
