= Frank Bond (British Army officer) =

British Army officer (1856–1930)

Major-General Sir Frank Bond KBE CB CMG
- Born: 10 August 1856; Marlborough, Wiltshire, England
- Died: 15 August 1930 (aged 74); Camberley, Surrey, England
- Burial place: St. Michael's Church, Camberley, Surrey
- Relatives: Francis Godolphin Bond (grandfather); Frederick Bligh Bond (brother); Lionel Vivian Bond (son)
- Military career
- Allegiance: United Kingdom
- Branch: British Army
- Service years: 1876–1919
- Rank: Major-General
- Unit: Royal Engineers
- Commands: Southern Command (India); 5th Brigade Bengal Sappers & Miners; 2nd Queen's Own Madras Sappers and Miners
- Conflicts: Anglo-Zulu War; Anglo-Egyptian War; Tirah campaign; Second Boer War
- Awards: Knight Commander of the Order of the British Empire; Companion of the Order of the Bath; Companion of the Order of St Michael and St George; Mentioned in Despatches; Army Distinguished Service Medal (United States)

Major-General Sir Francis George Bond, KBE, CB, CMG (10 August 1856 – 15 August 1930) was a British Army officer who served with the Royal Engineers in various campaigns in the 19th and early 20th centuries. He was a keen amateur sportsman, who played football for the Royal Engineers in the 1878 FA Cup Final.

== Family and education ==
Bond was born at Marlborough, Wiltshire, on 10 August 1856, the eldest son of Revd. Frederick Hookey Bond (1821–1897) and his wife, Mary Isabella née Delafosse (1833–1916). His father was the headmaster of Marlborough Royal Free Grammar School from 1853 to 1876. His paternal grandfather was Francis Godolphin Bond (1765–1839), who was a Rear-Admiral in the Royal Navy. With his parentage, Bond was originally intended for a career as a naval chaplain, before opting for a military career. Bond was baptised at St Mary the Virgin Church, Marlborough on 21 September 1856.

Bond was educated initially at his father's school, before attending Marlborough College and then joining the Royal Military Academy, Woolwich.

== Football career ==
Bond played rugby for Marlborough College, and both football and rugby while at the Royal Military Academy. On joining the Royal Engineers, Bond became a member of the Royal Engineers football team, although his football career was brief and was effectively terminated when he was posted to South Africa in 1879.

At this time, the Royal Engineers were among the best football sides in England, having participated in the FA Cup since its inception in 1871–72, reaching three finals and winning the trophy in 1875. In the early stages of the 1877–78 FA Cup tournament, Bond (playing at inside-left) scored twice with goals against Oxford University in the 4th round replays on 27 February and 12 March 1878, thus helping the engineers into the semi-final. This was a straightforward 2–1 victory over Old Harrovians, setting up a final against the Wanderers, who had won the cup in the two previous seasons. In the final, played at Kennington Oval on 23 March 1878, the "Sappers" put up a hard fight, but were unable to prevent the Wanderers winning their third consecutive FA Cup with a final score of 3–1. After the final, Bond was praised for his "good service in the cup-ties, keeping well on the ball and rarely missing a shot".

== Military career ==
Bond passed third in his class from the Royal Military Academy at Woolwich, and was commissioned as a (temporary) lieutenant in the Royal Engineers on 2 August 1876, subsequently made permanent with retrospective effect from 2 February 1876. On leaving the School of Mechanical Engineering at Chatham in November 1878, Bond was selected for the Telegraph Troop at Aldershot.

After a few months, however, Bond was sent to South Africa on 2 April 1879, arriving at the Cape on 13 May 1879 to participate in the Anglo-Zulu War. During the war, he was employed on lines of communication in Zululand and Natal in connection with the field telegraph and signalling, including creating and maintaining the Utrecht to Wakkerstroom telegraph line in the Transvaal. He remained in South Africa until 24 November 1879, arriving back in England on 27 January 1880. For his services during the Zulu War, Bond was awarded the South Africa Medal with clasp.

On his return to England, he served at the Royal Engineers depot at Aldershot, spending May and June 1880 at the School of Musketry at Hythe, Kent, until 8 August 1882, when he was sent to Egypt to take part in the Egyptian Campaign. In Egypt, he was employed in connection with Field Telegraph under Maj-Gen. G. Graham and later in charge of Pioneers attached to HQ Staff of the Cavalry Division under General Drury-Lowe. He was present at the action of Kassassin on 28 August and at Tell el Kebir on 13 September 1882, and the subsequent march to and capture of Cairo. He was withdrawn from Egypt on 20 October 1882, and returned to Aldershot. His service in Egypt earned him the Egypt Medal with clasp and the Khedive's Star. After nine months at Aldershot, Bond was appointed adjutant of the Royal Engineer troops on 8 August 1883, retaining this post until 19 September 1887, having been promoted to captain on 2 February 1887. In 1887, he was selected by Lieutenant-Colonel Bindon Blood to join the Bengal Sappers and Miners, based at Roorkee, 115 miles north of New Delhi.

From 12 March to 17 June 1891, Bond was Field Engineer in the 1st Brigade under Major-General W.K. Elles during the Hazara Expedition against the Black Mountain tribes. For his part in this expedition, Bond was mentioned in despatches, and awarded the India Service Medal with clasp. In January 1893, Bond returned to the U.K., spending ten months at Edinburgh and ten months at Aldershot, until November 1894 when he returned to India, where he spent the remainder of his active service, other than a year in South Africa. During this period at "home", Bond (as commander of a pontoon troop) earned the Humane Society's Medal for saving the life of a sapper, at Marlow on the River Thames, after Sapper Dudley had fallen into the river and become "hopelessly entangled in the weeds".

Capt. Bond, seeing the man struggling in the water, jumped in, and, at considerable risk, succeeded in effecting his rescue.

On his return to India, Bond re-joined the Bengal Sappers and Miners, being promoted to major with effect from 29 March 1895. In 1896, he became Superintendent of Instruction at Roorkee. Between December 1897 and February 1898, Bond commanded the 5th Brigade Bengal Sappers & Miners with the Peshawar column during the Tirah Expeditionary Force under Brig-Gen A.G. Hammond, followed by the operations in the Khyber Pass and Bazar Valley. On 1 January 1898, he was injured with a contusion (bruise) on his left hand when he was hit by a stone thrown up by an exploding mine. For his services in this campaign, Bond received the India Medal with two clasps and a further mention in despatches.

In March 1901, he was appointed Commander Royal Engineers on the North-West Frontier, including the Samana Range, the Tochi Valley and the Kurram Valley. In May 1901, Bond left India to become Deputy Assistant Adjutant General of the 4th Division in South Africa, joining up again with Lieutenant-General Bindon Blood. On Blood's return to India in September 1901, Bond remained as Chief Staff Officer in the Eastern Transvaal. On 1 January 1902, Bond was promoted to the local rank of lieutenant-colonel, with this rank being made permanent on 7 July 1902, shortly before his return to India. As well as receiving the Queen's South Africa Medal with three clasps, Bond was also appointed Companion of the Bath for his services during the Boer War.

Bond returned to India on 19 July 1902, where he served for nearly six years. His first post back in India was as commander of the 2nd Queen's Own Madras Sappers and Miners for two years, until 1904 when Lieutenant-General Bindon Blood (Commander-in-Chief Punjab Command) appointed him Assistant Quartermaster General in Punjab. receiving promotion to the substantive rank of colonel on 27 July 1905. In late 1905, following manoeuvres around Rawalpindi, Bond was responsible for ensuring that the four divisions of troops were ready and in the correct positions to take part in the parade in the city on 8 December 1905 to honour the Prince and Princess of Wales. On 6 January 1906, Bond was appointed as Assistant Quartermaster-General at HQ, based at Simla, and then on 19 March 1906 to Deputy Quartermaster-General for India. On 18 April 1908, Bond was promoted to the temporary rank of brigadier-general, and was now employed as Director General of Military Works in India.

On 7 February 1911, Bond was promoted to succeed Major General Francis Kelly as commander Southern Brigade with HQ at Wellington, Madras, under Sir O'Moore Creagh. Bond retired on 10 August 1913, on reaching the age of 57, with the honorary rank of brigadier-general.

=== Service during the First World War ===
Following the outbreak of the First World War, on 26 August 1914 Bond was recalled, and was appointed Assistant Director (Quartering) by his former colleague in India, General Sir John Cowans, now Quartermaster-General to the Forces. On 3 June 1916, Bond was promoted to the rank of temporary major-general, and appointed Director of Quartering in October 1917, retaining this post for the duration of the war.

After the war, Bond joined the Ministry of Pensions, with the role of organising hospitals for the care of the disabled.

For his services during the First World War, Bond was appointed a Companion of the Order of St Michael and St George on 3 June 1918, a Knight of Grace of the Order of the Hospital of St. John of Jerusalem on 31 October 1918, and a Knight Commander of the Order of the British Empire in the 1919 Birthday Honours, and was awarded the United States Army Distinguished Service Medal.

== Leisure and civic activities ==
Bond was an accomplished artist and is known to have made two coloured sketches of the scene at Rorke's Drift and the Buffalo River during the Zulu War.

On 4 February 1890, Bond was initiated into Freemasonry joining Beauchamp Lodge at Roorkee. He remained a Freemason throughout his time in India, achieving high office in the District Grand Lodge of Freemasons of the Punjab, before joining the Army and Navy Lodge at Aldershot on his return to England in 1913, of which he was still an active member at the time of his death in 1930.

He was a lay-reader in the Diocese of Lahore and a strong supporter of the Scouting movement, becoming Chief Commissioner for India.

== Marriage and children ==
On 1 February 1881, at St Jude's Church, Kensington, Bond was married to Alice Maud Vivian (1857–1944) by the Rt. Revd. Robert William Forrest assisted by Bond's father, Revd. Frederick Hookey Bond.

The couple had four sons:

- Francis Godolphin Bond (15 November 1881 – 15 June 1902), who died, aged 20, while an undergraduate at Cambridge University.
- Lionel Vivian Bond (16 June 1884 – 4 October 1961), who followed his father into the Royal Engineers, becoming GOC Malaya Command from 1939 to 1941.
- Richard Lawrence Bond (10 June 1890 – 13 May 1979), who also served in the Royal Engineers, becoming GOC, Sierra Leone & Gambia, and was a senior Freemason in Hampshire.
- Frederick Hamilton Bligh Bond (8 April 1894 – 13 May 1915), who served with the Royal Artillery in the First World War and was killed in action near Ypres. He is buried at White House Cemetery, St Jean-les-Ypres.

== Death and tributes ==
Bond suffered a severe heart attack in February 1928, and remained unwell until his death at home in Camberley on 15 August 1930. Hie was buried on 19 August 1930 at St. Michael's Church, Camberley with military honours.

General Sir Bindon Blood said of Bond:

I have watched Frank Bond's progress and his many important and brilliant services to the country, including his work in the Great War. To the end, he was the same as always: a soldier and a gentleman, a pattern to us all.

== Bibliography ==
- Collett, Mike (2003). The Complete Record of the FA Cup. Sports Books. ISBN 1-899807-19-5.
- Gibbons, Philip (2001). Association Football in Victorian England – A History of the Game from 1863 to 1900. Upfront Publishing. ISBN 1-84426-035-6.
- Warsop, Keith (30 November 2004). The Early F.A. Cup Finals and the Southern Amateurs. Nottingham: SoccerData. ISBN 978-1899468782.
