= Harry Pritchard =

Harry Pritchard is the name of:

- Harry Pritchard (British Army officer), British soldier
- Harry Pritchard (footballer), English footballer
