= Louis Oldfield =

British Army general

Major-General Sir Louis Oldfield KBE CB CMG DSO
- Born: February 1872
- Died: January 1949 (aged 76)
- Military career
- Allegiance: United Kingdom
- Branch: British Army
- Rank: Major-General
- Commands: 47th (2nd London) Division; Malaya Command
- Conflicts: First World War
- Awards: Knight Commander of the Order of the British Empire; Companion of the Order of the Bath; Companion of the Order of St Michael and St George; Distinguished Service Order

Major-General Sir Leopold Charles Louis Oldfield KBE CB CMG DSO (February 1872 – January 1949) was General Officer Commanding Malaya Command.

== Military career ==
Educated at Clifton College, Oldfield was, after graduating from the Royal Military Academy, Woolwich, commissioned into the Royal Artillery as a second lieutenant on 1 April 1892. He was promoted to lieutenant on 1 April 1895, and to captain on 5 April 1900, serving at the time with the 32 Battery Royal Field Artillery stationed at Deesa, British India. In October 1902 he was appointed adjutant of a Volunteer battalion, the 5th Lancashire Volunteer Artillery. He became a major in October 1909.

He served in the First World War on the Western Front. He was awarded the Distinguished Service Order (DSO), the citation for which appeared in The London Gazette and reads as follows:

For conspicuous ability and gallantry at Neuve Chapelle on 10th March, 1915, in command of his Battery in action, and for successful service in cutting wire entanglements. He took one of his guns to within 700 yards of the enemy, and so greatly facilitated the advance of our Infantry.

He was promoted on 9 September to lieutenant colonel and was latterly Brigadier General Royal Artillery for the 51st (Highland) Division in France in July 1916 and was granted the temporary rank of brigadier general while employed in this role. He was briefly acting General Officer Commanding 51st (Highland) Division between 11 March 1918 and 16 March 1918. In January 1918 he was made a brevet colonel.

After the War he became Brigadier General Royal Artillery for the British Army of the Rhine moving on to be Chief Instructor in Gunnery at the Royal School of Artillery at Larkhill in 1924. He was promoted to substantive major general in January 1926 and was made general officer commanding (GOC) of the Territorial Army's 47th (2nd London) Division from January 1927, taking over from Lieutenant General Sir William Thwaites.

He held this post for the next four years and after relinquishing command of the division was then placed on half-pay in January 1931, was GOC Malaya Command from later in the year; he retired in 1934.

He was also colonel commandant of the Royal Artillery from 1938 to 1942.

== Family ==
In 1902 he married Millicent Kate Bredin.

Military offices
Preceded by Sir William Thwaites	GOC 47th (2nd London) Division; 1927–1931	Succeeded by Richard Oldman
Preceded by Harry Pritchard	GOC Malaya Command; 1931–1934	Succeeded by Ernest Lewin
