= Malaya Command =

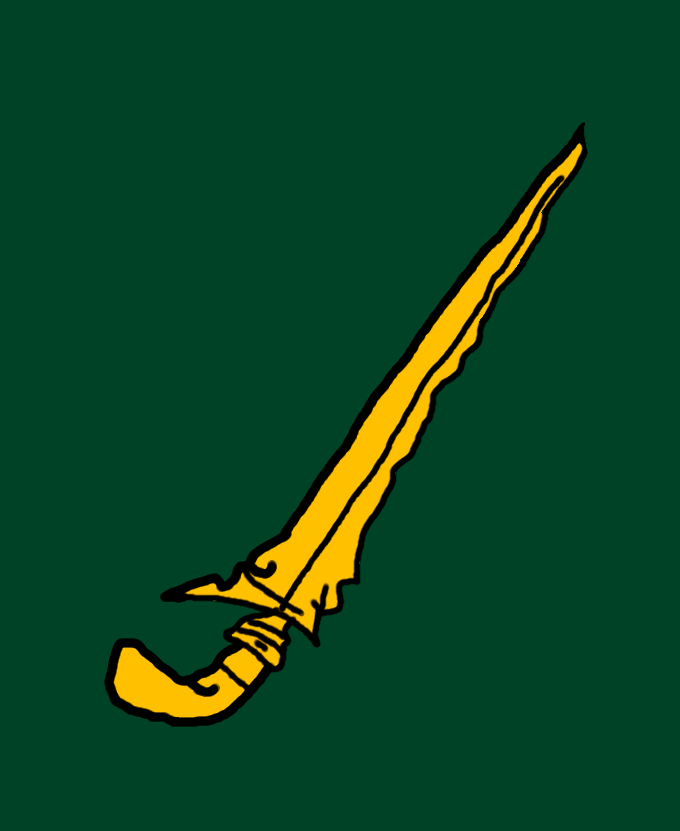
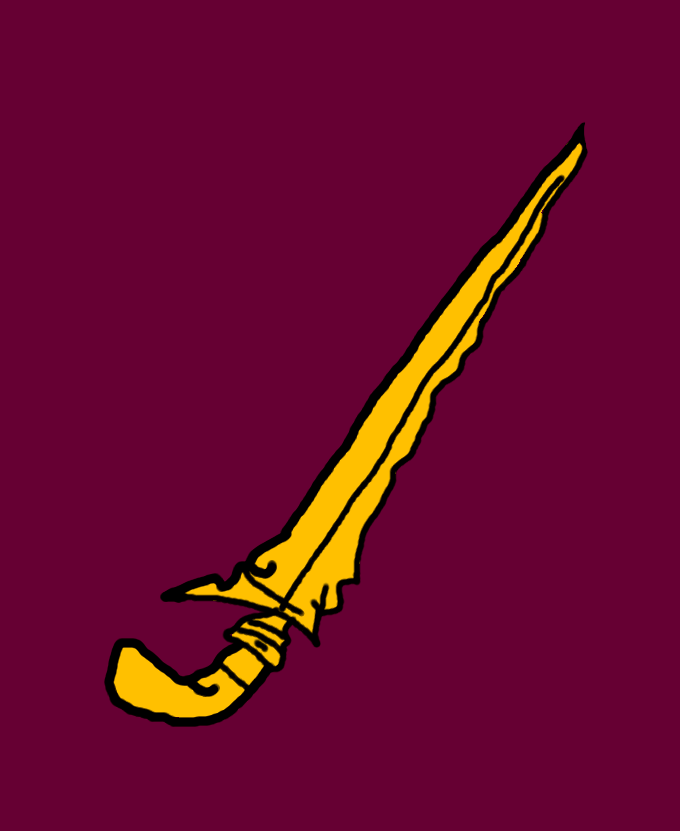
- The Malaya Command patch features a golden kris on a green background. Commonwealth troops in Malaya Command wore the same patch on a maroon background.
- Active: 1924–1942; 1945–1957
- Country: United Kingdom
- Branch: British Army
- Type: Command
- Garrison/HQ: Singapore

Commanders
- Notable commanders: Lieutenant-General Arthur Percival (16 May 1941 – 15 February 1942)

The Malaya Command was a formation of the British Army formed in the 1920s for the coordination of the defences of British Malaya, which comprised the Straits Settlements, the Federated Malay States and the Unfederated Malay States. It consisted mainly of small garrison forces in Kuala Lumpur, Penang, Taiping, Seremban and Singapore.

With the outbreak of the Second World War in 1939, the command reinforced its strength in anticipation of an attack. With the bulk of British forces being tied down in Europe and North Africa, the command was mainly augmented by units from India.

On 18 November 1940, the command was placed under the command of the British Far East Command and later, on 7 January 1942, under the short-lived South West Pacific Command or ABDACOM, which was tasked to maintain control of the "Malay Barrier" (or "East Indies Barrier"), a notional line running down the Malayan Peninsula, through Singapore and the southernmost islands of the Dutch East Indies. The command was disbanded on 15 February 1942 with the surrender of all Commonwealth forces in the conclusion of the Battle of Singapore.

With the Surrender of Japan, the command was re-formed from the 14th Army with its HQ based in Singapore on 1 November 1945. The command was divided and downgraded to the Malaya District and Singapore District in August 1947 but was upgraded again into a full command in August 1950 due to the Malayan Emergency.

With the independence of Malaya on 31 August 1957, the command was disbanded and succeeded by Overseas Commonwealth Land Forces (Malaya).

== Formation and structure ==
In November 1940, the total strength of Malaya Command was 17 battalions. The Indian Army contingent was mainly organised as III Corps with their HQ based in Kuala Lumpur.

When Japanese forces invaded Malaya on 8 December 1941, Lieutenant-General Arthur Percival, the General Officer Commanding (GOC) Malaya in charge of Malaya Command, with a force of 88,600 faced the 70,000 strong Twenty Fifth Army of the Imperial Japanese Army under the command of General Tomoyuki Yamashita.

== Allied land forces (8 December 1941) ==
As of 8 December 1941

=== III Indian Corps ===
- As of 7 December 1941

Commanding Officer III Indian Corps – Lt Gen Lewis Heath

==== 9th Indian Infantry Division ====
Maj-Gen Arthur Barstow ( †, 28 January 1942 at Layang-Layang near Bota)
HQ: Kuala Lumpur
- 8th Indian Infantry Brigade

Brig Bethold Key
HQ: Kota Bharu
- 2nd Battalion, 10th Baluch Regiment – Lt. Col. John Griffeth Frith
- 2nd Battalion, 12th Frontier Force Regiment – Lt. Col. Arthur Cumming
- 1st Battalion, 13th Frontier Force Rifles – Lt. Col. Clarence Gilbert
- 3rd Battalion, 17th Dogra Regiment – Lt. Col. George Allen Preston
- 21st Mountain Battery, Indian Artillery – Major John Bertram Sopper
- 19th Field Company (Royal Bombay Sappers and Miners) - Major M. Delmé Radcliffe RE

- 22nd Indian Infantry Brigade

Brig Gordon Painter
HQ: Kuantan
- 5th Battalion, 11th Sikh Regiment – Lt. Col. John Henry Devereux Parkin
- 2nd Battalion, 18th Royal Garhwal Rifles – Lt. Col. Guy Edward Ross Stewart Hartigan MC
- 5th Field Regiment, Royal Artillery – Lt. Col. Edward William Francis Jephson
- 22nd Field Company (Royal Bombay Sappers and Miners) - Major H.T. Heard RE

- Command troops

- 4th Battalion, Federated Malay States Volunteer Forces (Pahang) – Lt. Col. James Oliphant Mackellar (d.12 March 1945)
- 88th (2nd West Lancashire) Field Regiment RA – Lt. Col. Sylvain Claude D'Aubuz
- 42nd Field Park Company (Royal Bombay Sappers and Miners)- Major Thomas Wilfried Nash

==== 11th Indian Infantry Division ====
Maj-Gen David Murray-Lyon/Brig Archibald Paris/Maj-Gen Berthold Wells Key
HQ: Sungai Petani
- 6th Indian Infantry Brigade

Brig William Oswald Lay/Lt. Col. Henry Sloane Larkin
HQ: Jitra
- 2nd Battalion, East Surrey Regiment – Lt. Col. George Edward Swinton
- 1st Battalion, 8th Punjab Regiment – Lt. Col. Ronald Charles Sidney Bates ( †, 12 December 1941)
- 2nd Battalion, 16th Punjab Regiment – Lt. Col. Henry Sloane Larkin (Died as a POW on 1 January 1944)
- 22nd Mountain Artillery Regiment, Royal Artillery – Lt. Col. George Leonard Hughes
- 3rd Field Company (King George V's Bengal Sappers and Miners) - Major A.R. Beattie RE

- 15th Indian Infantry Brigade (III Corps Reserve)

Brig Kenneth Alfred Garrett/Brig. William St.John Carpendale
HQ: Jitra
- 1st Battalion, Leicestershire Regiment – Lt. Col. Charles Esmond Morrison
- 2nd Battalion, 9th Jat Regiment – Lt. Col. Charles Knowler Tester
- 1st Battalion, 14th Punjab Regiment – Lt. Col. Leslie Vernon "James" Fitzpatrick
- 23rd Field Company (Royal Bombay Sappers and Miners) - Major John Eglington Bate RE

- 28th (Gurkha) Infantry Brigade

Brig William St J. Carpendale/Lt. Col. Wallace Raymond Selby
HQ: Ipoh
- 2nd Battalion, 1st Gurkha Rifles – Lt. Col. John Oswald "Jack" Fulton ( †, 8 January 1942 at Slim River)
- 2nd Battalion, 2nd Gurkha Rifles – Lt. Col. Geoffrey Harley Douglas Woollcombe (Died Indian Ocean, 28 Feb. 1942)
- 2nd Battalion, 9th Gurkha Rifles – Lt. Col. Wallace Raymond Selby/Lt. Col. Maurice Bryer Allsebrook DSO MC
- 17th Field Company (Royal Bombay Sappers and Miners) - Major N.S. Bhagat – IE

- 11th Division command troops

- 3rd Cavalry (IA) – Lt. Col. Julian Gerald Barnes De Wilton
- 137th (2nd West Lancashire) Field Regiment, Royal Artillery – Lt. Col. Gilbert Daly Holmes ( † at Slim River)
- 155th (Lanarkshire Yeomanry) Field Regiment, Royal Artillery – Lt. Col. Alan Murdoch ( † at Slim River)
- 80th Anti-Tank Regiment, Royal Artillery – Lt. Col. William E.S. Napier
- 85th Anti-Tank Regiment, Royal Artillery – Lt. Col. A.J. Lardner-Clarke - arrived Singapore 13 January 1942
- 1st Independent Company – Major Sheppard Percy Fearon
- 43rd Field Park Company, (King George V's Bengal Sappers and Miners)

==== Krohcol ====
Lt. Col. Henry Dawson Moorhead
- 5th Battalion, 14th Punjab Regiment (3 Companies) – Lt. Col. Cyril Lovesy Lawrence Stokes ( † in captivity on 15th February 1942 following the Battle of Slim River)
- 3rd Battalion, 16th Punjab Regiment – Lt. Col. Henry Dawson Moorehead ( † at Battle of Muar)
- 2/3rd Australian Motor Company - Capt. George Arthur Carrick Kiernan

- Line of Communications Brigade

Brig Robert Gifford Moir

- 1st Battalion, Federated Malay States Volunteer Forces (Perak) - Lt Col. J.E.G. "Jim" Staley
- 2nd Battalion, Federated Malay States Volunteer Forces (Selangor) - Lt. Col. W.M. "Jimmie" James
- 3rd Battalion, Federated Malay States Volunteer Forces (Negeri Sembilan) – Lt. Col. C.F.H. Riches
- Light Battery, Federated Malay States Volunteer Forces (Equipped 4 x 3.7" How) - Major R. Wilshaw
- Armoured Car Company, Federated Malay States Volunteer Forces (Equipped 9 Armoured Cars) – Major C.E. Collinge
- Signals Battalion, Federated Malay States Volunteer Forces - Lt. Col. Stanley P. Moreton

- Fortress Penang

Brig Cyril Arthur Lyon
HQ: Penang

- D Company, 5th Battalion, 14th Punjab Regiment - Lieutenant Edward John Ellis
- 3rd Battalion, Straits Settlements Volunteer Force (Penang and Province Wellesley Volunteer Corps) - Lt. Col. The Hon Ernest De Buriatte
- 11th Coast Regiment, Royal Artillery – Lt. Col. M.L. More
- 2nd Anti-Aircraft Regiment, Indian Artillery

- Support units

- 5th Battalion, 14th Punjab Regiment (assigned to Krohcol) - Lt. Col. Cyril Lovesy Lawrence Stokes ( † in captivity on 15th February 1942 following the Battle of Slim River)
- 3rd Battalion, 16th Punjab Regiment (assigned to Krohcol) – Lt. Col. Henry Moorhead ( † at Battle of Muar)
- 1st Battalion, Mysore Infantry (Indian States Forces) – Lt. Col. Kenneth Harvey Preston
- 1st Battalion, Bahawalpur Infantry (Indian States Forces) – Lt. Col. Harry Ernest Tyrell
- 1st Battalion, Hyderabad Regiment (Indian States Forces) – Lt. Col. Charles Albert Hendrick ( †, 10 December 1941 at Kota Bharu)
- 11th Indian Division Signal Regiment

- Corps troops

- 45 Army Troops Company (Royal Bombay Sappers and Miners)
- 46 Army Troops Company (Queen Victoria's Own Madras Sappers and Miners)
- 1 Artisan Works Company (Royal Bombay Sappers and Miners)

=== Australian 8th Division ===
- Australian 8th Division

Maj Gen Gordon Bennett
HQ: Kluang

- 2/10th Field Regiment (Equipped 8 × 18-Pdr and 16 × 4.5" How. / re-equipped with 24 × 25-Pdr between 9–12 January 1942) - Lt.Col. A.W. Walsh
- 2/15th Field Regiment (Equipped 24 × 25-Pdr) - Lt. Col. J.W. Wright
- 4th Anti-Tank Regiment (Equipped 12 × 2-Pdr / 24 × 75mm) – Lt. Col. Cranston Albury McEachern
- 2/10th Field Company - Major K.P.H Lawrence
- 2/12th Field Company - Major J.A.L. Shaw
- 2/6th Field Park Company - Capt. T.T. Lewis

- Australian 22nd Brigade

Brig Harold Burfield Taylor
HQ: Mersing – Endau
- 2/18th Australian Infantry Battalion – Lt. Col. Arthur Varley (Died as POW 13 September 1944)
- 2/19th Australian Infantry Battalion – Lt. Col. Charles Anderson VC
- 2/20th Australian Infantry Battalion – Lt. Col. Charles Frederick Assheton † (12 February 1942)

- Australian 27th Brigade

Brig Duncan Maxwell
HQ: Kluang
- 2/26th Australian Infantry Battalion – Lt. Col. Arthur Harold Boyes † (12 February 1942)/Richard Oakes
- 2/29th Australian Infantry Battalion – Lt. Col. John Charles Robertson † (18 Jan. 1942 during Battle of Muar)/ Lt. Col. Pond
- 2/30th Australian Infantry Battalion – Lt. Col. Frederick Gallagher "Jack" Galleghan

=== Fortress Singapore ===
Commanding Officer – Maj Gen Frank Keith Simmons HQ: Singapore

- Fortress Singapore Division

Maj Gen F. K. Simmons

- 1st Malaya Brigade

Brig George Giffard Rawson Williams
- 2nd Battalion, Loyal Regiment (North Lancashire) – Lt. Col. Mordaunt Elrington
- 1st Battalion, Malay Regiment – Lt. Col. James Richard Glencoe André
- 2nd Battalion, Malay Regiment – Lt. Col. Frederick Walter Young

- 2nd Malaya Brigade

Brig Francis Hugh Fraser
- 1st Battalion, Manchester Regiment – Lt. Col. Edward Barclay Holmes
- 2nd Battalion, Gordon Highlanders – Lt. Col. John Heslop Stitt/Richard Gilbert Lees
- 2nd Battalion, 17th Dogra Regiment – Lt. Col. Sidney Clermont Scott

- Straits Settlements Volunteer Force Brigade

Col Francis Reginald Grimwood
- 1st Battalion, Straits Settlements Volunteer Force (Singapore Volunteer Corps) – Lt. Col. Thomas Henry Newey
- 2nd Battalion, Straits Settlements Volunteer Force (Singapore Volunteer Corps) - Lt. Col. Donald G. Macleod
- 4th Battalion, Straits Settlements Volunteer Force (Malacca Volunteer Corps) – Lt. Col. Charles Alexander Scott
- Singapore Armoured Car Company, Straits Settlements Volunteer Force

- Royal Engineers Brigade

Brig Ivan Simson
- 30th Fortress Company, Royal Engineers
- 34th Fortress Company, Royal Engineers
- 35th Fortress Company, Royal Engineers
- 41st Fortress Company, Royal Engineers

- Artillery

Commander, Air Defences, Singapore – Brig Alec Warren Greenlaw Wildey
- 1st (Heavy) Anti-Aircraft Regiment, Indian Artillery - Lt. Col. John Rowley Williamson DSO
- 1st Heavy Anti-Aircraft Regiment, Hong Kong and Singapore Royal Artillery - Lt. Col. Archer Edwards Tawney
- 2nd Heavy Anti-Aircraft Regiment, Hong Kong and Singapore Royal Artillery – Lt. Col. Howard Wincent Allpres
- 3rd Light Anti-Aircraft Regiment, Hong Kong and Singapore Royal Artillery - Lt. Col. Denis Vivian Hill
- 3rd Heavy Anti-Aircraft Regiment, Royal Artillery - Lt. Col. Francis Edgar Hugonin
- 5th Searchlight Regiment, Royal Artillery – Lt. Col. R.A.O. Clarke
Commander, Fixed Defences, Singapore – Brigadier A.D. Curtis
- 7th Coast Regiment, Royal Artillery – Lt. Col. Hereward Douglas St. George Cardew
- 9th Coast Regiment, Royal Artillery – Lt. Col. Charles Philip Heath
- 16th Defence Regiment, Royal Artillery – Lt. Col. M.S.H. Maxwell-Gumbleton

- Support units

- Half Strength Jind Infantry Battalion (Indian States Forces) (½ Strength) – Lt. Col. Gurbaksh Singh
- Half Strength Kapurthala Infantry Battalion (Indian States Forces) (½ Strength) - Major Aziz Ahmad
- Dalforce – Lt. Col. John Dalley

=== Malaya Command Reserve ===
Commanding Officer: Brig.A.C.M. Paris/Lt. Col. I.M. Stewart HQ: Port Dickson

- 12th Indian Infantry Brigade – Brig.A.C.M. Paris/Lt. Col. I.M. Stewart

HQ: Port Dickson
- 2nd Battalion, Argyll and Sutherland Highlanders – Lt. Col. I.M.Stewart/ Lt. Col. Lindsay Robertson ( † 20 January 1942)
- 5th Battalion, 2nd Punjab Regiment – Lt. Col. Cecil Deakin
- 4th Battalion, 19th Hyderabad Regiment – Lt. Col. Eric Lawrence Wilson-Haffenden/Lt. Col. Herbert Lawrence Hill
- 122nd (West Riding) Field Regiment, Royal Artillery – Lt. Col. George St.John Armitage Dyson ( † 22 November 1942)
- 15 Field Company (Queen Victoria's Own Madras Sappers and Miners) - Major R. B. Muir RE

=== Sarawak Force (SARFOR) ===
Commanding Officer: Lt-Col Charles Malet Lane HQ: Kuching

- SARFOR

Lt-Col C. M. Lane
HQ: Kuching
- 2nd Battalion, 15th Punjab Regiment – (this battalion took part in the Battle of Borneo where it surrendered).
- Sarawak Coastal Marine Service
- Sarawak Volunteer Corps
- Sarawak Rangers
- Sarawak Armed Police
- 35th Fortress Company, Royal Engineers
- 6" Guns Battery, Hong Kong and Singapore Royal Artillery
- Brunei State Police
- Brunei Volunteer Force

=== Christmas Island ===
Commanding Officer: Capt Leonard Walter Thomas Williams HQ: Christmas Island

- 6" Gun, Hong Kong and Singapore Royal Artillery

== Reinforcements ==
=== Arrived January 3rd 1942 – February 5th 1942 ===
In addition to the units listed below a number of replacement drafts were sent to Singapore on convoys MS2 from Melbourne arriving 24/1/1942 and BM12 from Bombay arriving 5/2/1942
- 44th Indian Infantry Brigade - (Arrived 25-Jan-1942 Convoy BM10) – Brigadier George Cecil Ballentine

- 6th Battalion, 1st Punjab Regiment – Lt. Col. James Dow Sainter MC
- 7th Battalion, 8th Punjab Regiment – Lt. Col. Willis Southern
- 6th Battalion, 14th Punjab Regiment - Lt. Col. Louis Sobaux Ingle MC

- 45th Indian Infantry Brigade - (Arrived 3-Jan-1942 Convoy BM9A) – Brigadier Herbert Cecil Duncan ( † at Battle of Muar)

- 7th Battalion, 6th Rajputana Rifles - Lt. Col. James Albert Lewis ( † at Battle of Muar)
- 4th Battalion, 9th Jat Regiment – Lt. Col. John Whittaker Williams ( † at Battle of Muar)
- 5th Battalion, 18th Royal Garhwal Rifles – Lt. Col. James H.C. Woolridge ( † at Battle of Muar)
- 13th Indian Auxiliary Pioneer Battalion

- 13th Indian Field Company (Madras Sappers and Miners) (Arrived 3-Jan-1942 Convoy BM9A) - Major B.E. Whitman RE
- 100th Light Tank Squadron (Arrived 29-Jan-1942 Convoy BM11) – Major Jack Alford ( † 12 Feb 1942) equipped Carden Lloyd Tankettes

- 18th Infantry Division – Major-General Merton Beckwith-Smith

- 53rd Infantry Brigade - (Arrived 13 January 1942 Convoy DM1) – Brig. Cecil Leonard Basil Duke

- 5th Battalion, Royal Norfolk Regiment – Lt. Col. Eric Charles Prattley
- 6th Battalion, Royal Norfolk Regiment – Lt. Col. Ian Conway Gilford Lywood ( † at Alexandra Hospital Massacre)
- 2nd Battalion, Cambridgeshire Regiment – Lt. Col. Gordon Calthorpe Thorne (Died, Indian Ocean while attempting to escape)

- 54th Infantry Brigade - (Arrived 29 January 1942 Convoy BM11) – Brig. Edward Henry Walford Backhouse

- 4th Battalion, Royal Norfolk Regiment – Lt. Col. Alfred Ernest Knights
- 4th Battalion, Suffolk Regiment – Lt. Col. Alec Albert Johnson
- 5th Battalion, Suffolk Regiment – Lt. Col. Lionel John Baker

- 55th Infantry Brigade - (Arrived 29 January 1942 Convoy BM11) – Brig. Tristram Hugh "Tim" Massy-Beresford

- 5th Battalion, Bedfordshire and Hertfordshire Regiment – Lt. Col. Douglas Rhys Thomas
- 1/5th Battalion, Sherwood Foresters – Lt. Col. Harold Hutchinson Lilly
- 1st Battalion, Cambridgeshire Regiment – Lt. Col. Gerald Goodwin Carpenter

- Divisional troops

- 9th Battalion, Royal Northumberland Fusiliers (Machine Gun Battalion) - (Arrived 5-Feb-1942 Convoy BM12) – Lt. Col. Lechmere Cay Thomas
- 18th Reconnaissance Battalion, Reconnaissance Corps 5th Battalion Loyal Regiment (North Lancashire) - (Arrived 5 February 1942 Convoy BM12) – Lt. Col. Henry Arnold Fitt

- Royal Artillery

- 118th (8th London) Field Regiment, Royal Artillery (TA) - (Arrived 29 January 1942 Convoy BM11) – Lt. Col. C.E.Mackellar
- 135th (East Anglian) (Hertfordshire Yeomanry) Field Regiment, Royal Artillery - (Arrived 13 January 1942 Convoy DM1) – Lt. Col. Philip Toosey
- 148th (Bedfordshire Yeomanry) Field Regiment, Royal Artillery - (Arrived 29 January 1942 Convoy BM11) – Lt. Col. S.W.Harris
- 85th Anti-Tank Regiment, Royal Artillery - (Arrived 13 January 1942 Convoy DM1) – Lt. Col. Andrew John Lardner-Clarke
- 125th (Northumbrian) Anti-Tank Regiment, Royal Artillery - (Arrived 5 February 1942 Convoy BM12) – Lt. Col. James Dean
- 35th Light Anti-Aircraft Regiment, Royal Artillery (144th Battery and part of 89th Battery) (Arrived 13 January 1942 Convoy DM1) – Lt. Col. John Bassett
- 6th Heavy Anti-Aircraft Regiment, Royal Artillery (part) (Arrived 13 January 1942 Convoy DM1)– Lt. Col. G.W.G Baass

- Royal Army Medical Corps

- 186th Field Ambulance
- 196th Field Ambulance
- 197th Field Ambulance (Arrived 5 February 1942 Convoy BM12)

- Royal Engineers

- 287th Field Company
- 288th Field Company
- 560th Field Company
- 251st Field Park Company (Arrived 5-Feb-1942 Convoy BM12)

- Australian
  - 2/4th Machine Gun Battalion (Arrived 24 January 1942 Convoy MS2) – Lt. Col. M.J.Anketell † (Feb. 1942)

== Allied Air Force units in Malaya December 1941 ==
There were 161 front line aircraft, including three Royal Netherlands Air Force Catalina flying boats, based in Malaya and on Singapore Island on 8 December 1941. These units came under the control of Far East Air Force (Royal Air Force) under the command of Air Vice Marshal C.W.H.Pulford until February 1942 when Air Vice Marshal P.C.Maltby took command.

=== Based on Singapore Island ===
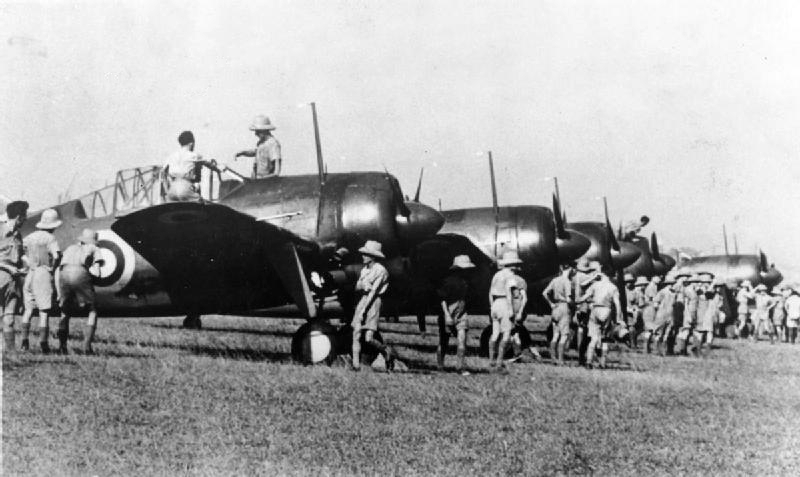
Brewster Buffalo Mark Is from No. 453 Squadron RAAF being inspected by RAF personnel at Sembawang Airfield, Singapore on 12 October 1941.

- RAF Seletar;
- No. 36 Squadron RAF – 6 × Vickers Vildebeest
- No. 100 Squadron RAF – 12 × Vickers Vildebeest
- No. 205 Squadron RAF – 3 × PBY Catalina
- RAF Tengah;
- No. 34 Squadron RAF – 16 × Bristol Blenheim IV
- RAF Sembawang;
- No. 453 Squadron RAAF – 16 × Brewster Buffalo
- RAF Kallang;
- No. 243 Squadron RAF – 14 × Brewster Buffalo
- No. 488 Squadron RNZAF – 16 × Brewster Buffalo

=== Based in Northern Malaya ===
- Sungei Patani;
- No. 21 Squadron RAAF – 12 × Brewster Buffalo
- No. 27 Squadron RAF – 12 × Bristol Blenheim I
- RAF Kota Bharu;
- No. 1 Squadron RAAF – 12 × Lockheed Hudson
- Detachment from No. 243 Squadron RAF – 2 × Brewster Buffalo
- Gong Kedak;
- Detachment from No. 36 Squadron RAF – 6 × Vickers Videbeest
- RAF Kuantan;
- No. 8 Squadron RAAF – 12 × Lockheed Hudson
- No. 60 Squadron RAF – 8 × Bristol Blenheim
- Alor Star;
- No. 62 Squadron RAF – 11 × Bristol Blenheim

== Commanders-in-Chief ==
Commanders-in-Chief have included:
GOC Troops in the Straits Settlements

- until early 1900: Major-General John Baillie Ballantyne Dickson
- 1903–1905 Major-General Arthur Dorward
- 1905–1907 Major-General Inigo Jones
- 1907–1910 Major-General Thomas Perrott
- 1910–1914 Major-General Theodore Stephenson
- 1914–1915 Major-General Raymond Reade
- 1915–1921 Major-General Sir Dudley Ridout
- 1921–1924 Major-General Sir Neill Malcolm

GOC Malaya Command

- 1924–1927 Major-General Sir Theodore Fraser
- 1927–1929 Major-General Sir Casimir van Straubenzee
- 1929–1931 Major-General Harry Pritchard
- 1931–1934 Major-General Sir Louis Oldfield
- 1934–1935 Major-General Ernest Lewin
- 1935–1939 Major-General Sir William Dobbie
- 1939–1941 Lieutenant-General Sir Lionel Bond
- 1941–1942 Lieutenant-General Arthur Percival

Note from 1943 to 1945 Malaya was under Japanese control

- Nov–Dec 1945 Lieutenant-General Sir Miles Dempsey
- 1945–1946 Lieutenant-General Sir Frank Messervy
- 1946–1947 Lieutenant-General Sir Alexander Galloway

GOC Malaya District

- 1947–1948 Major-General Ashton Wade
- 1948–1950 Major-General Sir Charles Boucher

GOC Malaya

- 1950–1952 Major-General Roy Urquhart
- 1952–1954 Major-General Sir Hugh Stockwell
- 1954–1956 Lieutenant-General Sir Geoffrey Bourne
- 1956–1957 Lieutenant-General Sir Roger Bower

== See also ==
- Japanese Order of Battle, Malayan Campaign
