= 85th Anti-Tank Regiment, Royal Artillery =

- Country: United Kingdom
- Role: Anti-Tank artillery
- Size: Regiment

The 85th Anti-Tank Regiment, Royal Artillery was formed in September 1941 during the Second World War. After training in Essex, the regiment was embarked on to the SS Narkunda, a ship in a "WS" Convoy. When the convoy departed the docks, the 85th was heading for Basra, Iraq via the Cape of Good Hope. The guns and equipment were painted in desert camouflage. The convoy sailed south to Durban, South Africa. While en route, the Japanese attacked Pearl Harbor and invaded the Philippines. The regiment was diverted from its original desert destination to Singapore as reinforcements of the garrison.

== Origin ==
The 85th Anti-Tank Regiment, Royal Artillery was formed on 23 September 1941. The regiment comprised four anti-tank batteries, the 45th, 251st, 270th and the 281st.

In September 1941, the regiment was camped at John Groom's Orphanage and Flower Girls' Home at Clacton-on-Sea, Essex.

=== Batteries ===
==== 45th Battery ====
The 45th Battery was in Cattistock and was detached on 29 September 1941 from the 20th Anti-Tank Regiment and posted to the 85th AT Regiment at Clacton-on-Sea. There were 126 men (Other Ranks) on the November 1941 embarkation roll.

==== 251st Battery ====
The 251st Battery was detached from the 63rd (Oxfordshire Yeomanry) Anti-Tank Regiment, a territorial unit which had its HQ at Oxford. The 251st departed Portrush, Northern Ireland, on 27 September 1941 to join the 85th being formed at Butlin's Camp, Clacton-on-Sea. There were 126 men (Other Ranks) on the November 1941 embarkation roll.

==== 270th Battery ====
The 270th Battery was detached from the 68th Anti-Tank Regiment on 23 September 1941 to join the 85th AT Regiment. There were 128 men (Other Ranks) on the November 1941 embarkation roll.

==== 281st Battery ====
The 281st Battery was detached from the 70th Anti-Tank Regiment to join the 85th AT Regiment. The 281st departed Storrington on 27 September 1941. There were 126 men (Other Ranks) on the November 1941 embarkation roll.

=== Commander ===
Lt. Col. Andrew John Lardner-Clarke

=== Equipment ===
48 × 2-pounders. Standard procedure was for each Battery to consist of three Troops, each of which had four 2-pounder MkII guns, for a total 12 per Battery, or 48 for the Regiment.

== Travel ==
The 85th regiment boarded the converted P&O ocean liner SS Narkunda at Gourock near Greenock, Scotland on the River Clyde on 11 November 1941, as part of "Winston Special" convoy WS 12Z. Convoy WS 12Z sails just before midnight of 12/13 November. Convoy WS 12Z arrives at Freetown, Sierra Leone on 25 November 1941. The convoy leaves Freetown on 28 November 1941. While in transit to Durban, South Africa, the Japanese attacked Pearl Harbor on 7 December 1941. The Japanese also invade the Philippines, Malaya, Thailand and Hong Kong on 8 December 1941. The convoy arrived at Durban, South Africa, on 18 December 1941. Because of the Japanese attacks 8 December 1941, the 85th and others were diverted from their original destinations.

On 24 December 1941, convoys WS12Z-A (Aden), WS12Z-B (Bombay) and WS12Z-M (Malaya) depart Durban. The ships in Convoy WS12Z-M, headed to reinforce Singapore, were Narkunda, MV Aorangi, MV Sussex and MS Abbekerk. On 30 December 1941, USS Mount Vernon joins convoys WS12Z-A, WS12Z-B and WS12Z-M at 0832 (GMT +4). At 1000, USS Mount Vernon, escort HMS Emerald and WS12Z-M detach and become Convoy DM 1. Convoy DM 1 is headed for Maldives. There was a fuelling stop at "Port T", Addu Atoll, Maldives,4–5 January 1942 (no shore leave). and then convoy DM 1 continues to Singapore. Nakunda reached Keppel Harbour, Singapore on 13 January 1942.

== Singapore ==
The 85th were transported from the docks to Birdwood Barracks, near Changi. On 14 January 1942 the 85th AT Regiment was attached to 11 Indian Brigade and moved some fifty miles north of Birdwood Camp to Jahore Baru and began defence of Singapore. They were called into action the next day in a rubber plantation just north of the Sultan of Jahore's palace which they fought for a week. On 5 February 1942, the 85th was sent to the RAF base at Seletar to guard the airfield. The next day, they evacuated the base and withdrew to the residential district of Mount Pleasant in Singapore City. On 13 February 1942, the 85th set up defensive positions at Halifax Road.

== Prisoners of war ==
The Singapore Garrison capitulated on 15 February 1942 and the POWs were marched to Changi Prison. Subsequently, most of the POWs were enslaved and forced to work on the infamous Death Railroad. The BRE (Bureau of Record and Enquiry), initially a secret POW group in Changi, prepared Index Rolls of all British Army forces serving in Malaya from the date of commencement of hostilities to capitulation on 15 February 1942. The 85th A/T Regt R.A. is Roll 33. The nominal Roll for the 85th totals 614 men – 41 officers and 573 Other Ranks. The mortality rate was high, with 197 men dead; mainly in Thailand, Singapore, or on a Hell Ship, but some in Formosa, China (Hong Kong), Malaysia or Japan.

== See also ==
- Far East Prisoners of War
