= James Cooke-Collis =

British Army general

Major-General Sir James Cooke-Collis KBE CB CMG DSO
- Born: 7 May 1876; Castle Cooke, Kilworth, County Cork, Ireland
- Died: 14 April 1941 (aged 64); Dunmurry, Northern Ireland
- Military career
- Allegiance: United Kingdom
- Branch: British Army
- Rank: Major-General
- Commands: Northern Ireland District; 55th (West Lancashire) Infantry Division; 11th Infantry Brigade
- Conflicts: Second Boer War; First World War
- Awards: Knight Commander of the Order of the British Empire; Companion of the Order of the Bath; Companion of the Order of St Michael and St George; Distinguished Service Order; Mentioned in Despatches (9); Officer of the Legion of Honour (France); Order of Saint Stanislaus, 3rd Class (Russia)

Major-General Sir William James Norman Cooke-Collis, KBE, CB, CMG, DSO (7 May 1876 – 14 April 1941) was a senior British Army officer who served as General Officer Commanding Northern Ireland District from 1935 to 1938.

== Military career ==
Cooke-Collis was born on 7 May 1876 in Castle Cooke, Kilworth, County Cork to Lieutenant Colonel William Cooke-Collis and Catherine Maria Cooke-Collis (née Oliphant) and was educated at Cheltenham College. He was first commissioned into a militia battalion of the King's Royal Rifle Corps, transferring to the regular army with appointment as second lieutenant in the Royal Irish Rifles (later the Royal Ulster Rifles) on 24 February 1900. He served with Mounted infantry in the Second Boer War from 1900 to 1902, and was wounded in the attack on Dewetsdorp in November 1900. For his service in the war, he was mentioned in despatches and received the Queen's South Africa Medal with three clasps. Following the end of the war in June 1902, he left South Africa on the SS Kinfauns Castle in October 1902. He was promoted to lieutenant on 10 December 1902.

Cooke-Collis later served in the First World War. He was promoted to major on 1 September 1915 and to brevet lieutenant colonel on 3 June 1916 "for Distinguished Service in the Field". On 25 August 1917 he was placed in command of the 80th Infantry Brigade on the Macedonian front and was granted the temporary rank of brigadier general while employed in this role.

After the war he was appointed Military Governor at Batoum (present-day Batumi) in Transcaucasia. He became commander of the 11th Infantry Brigade in 1927 and, after serving on half-pay in November 1931, became General Officer Commanding (GOC) the 55th (West Lancashire) Division in 1934. He was the appointed GOC Northern Ireland District in 1935. He was responsible for ensuring that the Royal Ulster Rifles had its depot in Ballymena, its own recruiting ground, rather than in Belfast. He was invested as a Knight Commander of the Order of the British Empire in 1937. He retired in 1938 and died on 14 April 1941, aged 64.

== Family ==
Cooke-Collis married Cléonice Gamble, daughter of Major George Francis Gamble on 30 January 1906.

Military offices
| Preceded by George Weir | GOC 55th (West Lancashire) Division; 1934–1935 | Succeeded by Ernest Lewin |
| Preceded by Eric Girdwood | General Officer Commanding the British Army in Northern Ireland; 1935–1938 | Succeeded by Robert Pollok |
