= Henry Majendie (cricketer) =

English cricketer, clergyman

Personal information
- Full name: Henry William Majendie
- Born: 12 February 1840; Calne, Wiltshire, England
- Died: 13 December 1923 (aged 83); Charminster, Dorset, England
- Batting: Unknown
- Role: Wicket-keeper
- Relatives: Vivian Majendie (son)

Domestic team information
- Years: Team
- 1860: Oxford University

Career statistics
Competition	First-class
Matches	1
Runs scored	4
Batting average	4.00
100s/50s	–/–
Top score	4
Catches/stumpings	1/–
- Source: Cricinfo, 21 March 2020

Henry William Majendie (12 February 1840 – 13 December 1923) was an English first-class cricketer and clergyman.

The son of George John Majendie, he was born in February 1840 at Calne, Wiltshire. He was educated at Winchester College, matriculating in 1858 at Exeter College, Oxford, graduating B.A. in 1863 and M.A. in 1866. While studying at Oxford, he made a single appearance in first-class cricket for Oxford University against the Marylebone Cricket Club at Oxford in 1860. Batting once in the match, he was dismissed in the Oxford first-innings for 4 runs by William Martingell. While at Oxford, Majendie was a student of the Middle Temple.

After graduating from Oxford, he took holy orders in the Church of England. Having held a number of ecclesiastical posts between 1866 and 1875, he became vicar of Holy Trinity Church, Barnstaple in 1875. From 1884 to 1900, he was the vicar of Tormohun, Devon. From 1904, he was vicar of Ilsham in Torquay, in addition to being an honorary canon of Exeter Cathedral. Majendie died at Charminster in December 1923. His son, Vivian, was a general in the British Army and also played first-class cricket.
