= Ernest Lewin =

Major-General Ernest Lewin CB CMG DSO
- Born: 7 April 1879
- Died: 10 May 1950 (aged 71)
- Military career
- Allegiance: United Kingdom
- Branch: British Army
- Service years: 1900–1938; 1939–1941
- Rank: Major-General
- Commands: Portsmouth Area (1939–1940); 55th (West Lancashire) Infantry Division (1935–1938); Malaya Command (1934–1935)
- Conflicts: First World War; Second World War
- Awards: Companion of the Order of the Bath; Companion of the Order of St Michael and St George; Distinguished Service Order

Major-General Ernest Ord Lewin, CB, CMG, DSO (7 April 1879 – 10 May 1950) was a senior British Army officer who served as General Officer Commanding Malaya Command from 1934 to 1935.

== Military career ==
Lewin was educated at Winchester College, for which he played cricket, and King's College, Cambridge. He was commissioned into the Royal Field Artillery as a second lieutenant on 26 May 1900, and was promoted to lieutenant on 9 April 1902. In his early career, he served as a Staff Officer in India and in the United Kingdom, before become an adjutant in 1914.

Lewin served in the First World War as a General Staff Officer in France. In 1918, during the North Russia intervention, he was chief of staff to Major-General Charles Maynard and served in the Murmansk area of Russia.

In 1927 he was appointed Brigadier Royal Artillery at Aldershot Command and in 1934 he became General Officer Commanding Malaya Command. He was made commander of the 55th (West Lancashire) Infantry Division in 1935 and retired in 1938. He was re-employed during the Second World War as General Officer Commanding Portsmouth Area in 1939 and then as Major-General in Charge of Administration for Southern Command in 1940; he retired again in 1941.

== Family ==
Lewin married and had one son and one daughter.

Military offices
Preceded by Sir Louis Oldfield	GOC Malaya Command; 1934–1935	Succeeded by Sir William Dobbie
Preceded by James Cooke-Collis	GOC 55th (West Lancashire) Infantry Division; 1935–1938	Succeeded by Vivian Majendie
