= Ridley Pakenham-Walsh =

British Army general

Major-General Ridley Pakenham-Walsh CB MC
- Born: 29 April 1888; Kilkenny, Ireland
- Died: 3 November 1966 (aged 78)
- Military career
- Allegiance: United Kingdom
- Branch: British Army
- Service years: 1908–1946
- Rank: Major-General
- Service number: 4284
- Unit: Royal Engineers
- Commands: Salisbury Plain District (1941–43); IX Corps (1941); Northern Ireland District (1940–41); Chatham Area (1939); School of Military Engineering (1939)
- Conflicts: First World War; Second World War
- Awards: Companion of the Order of the Bath; Military Cross; Mentioned in Despatches

Major-General Ridley Pakenham Pakenham-Walsh, CB, MC (29 April 1888 – 3 November 1966) was a senior British Army officer who served as Engineer-in-Chief of the British Expeditionary Force in the Battle of France and later as General Officer Commanding Northern Ireland District and IX Corps.

== Military career ==
After attending the Royal Military Academy, Woolwich, Pakenham-Walsh was commissioned into the Royal Engineers (RE) in December 1908. He became an instructor at the Royal Military College, Duntroon, in Australia, in 1914.

Pakenham-Walsh served in World War I, in the Gallipoli campaign and on the Western Front. He was promoted to captain on 18 December 1914, and to Acting Major on 9 January 1917 when he took command of a field company. He was awarded the Military Cross in the 1918 New Year Honours list. From 15 July 1918 until the end of the war in November he held the appointment of Commander, Royal Engineers, (CRE) to 3rd Division in the final Allied Hundred Days Offensive, with the rank of acting Lieutenant-Colonel.

After the war he became British Representative at the International Commission in Teschen, Poland, and attended the Staff College, Camberley from 1921 to 1922. He was then appointed an instructor in tactics at the School of Military Engineering (SME) in 1923. After attending the Imperial Defence College in 1931 he was appointed a General Staff Officer and then Assistant Adjutant General (Mobilisation) at the War Office, before becoming Brigadier, General Staff, of Eastern Command in 1935. In June 1939 he took up the appointment of Commandant of the SME, which also carried the titles of Inspector, RE, and General Officer Commanding Chatham Area, but left these roles on the outbreak of World War II when he was appointed as Engineer-in-Chief for the British Expeditionary Force (BEF). During the 'Phoney War' his office's work involved designing reinforced concrete defences around Lille.

When the Phoney War ended with the German invasion of the Low Countries on 10 May, the BEF abandoned these defences and advanced to aid the Belgians under the Anglo-French Plan D. However, the German breakthrough in the Ardennes threatened the BEF's flank and forced its withdrawal back into France. Soon the situation was so dangerous that Pakenham-Walsh was ordered to organise all the RE units employed at General Headquarters and on the Lines of Communication into improvised infantry battalions to assist the defence. By 26 May the BEF was cut off and the decision had been made to evacuate it through Dunkirk. The commander of III Corps, Lt-Gen Sir Ronald Adam, was sent to command the British troops forming the perimeter covering the port and to coordinate the evacuation (Operation Dynamo) with the naval authorities, with Pakenham-Walsh to assist him.

After the Dunkirk evacuation he was sent as Head of Mission to the United States, then became GOC Northern Ireland District in 1940–41. He was appointed GOC of IX Corps in 1941 and commander of Salisbury Plain District in 1941–3. Early in 1943 he was appointed Controller-General Army Provision, Eastern Group, in charge of procuring all kinds of military stores from Commonwealth and Allied sources east of Suez, and supplying them to the forces operating in that theatre. He retired in 1946.

After retirement he was commissioned by the Institution of Royal Engineers to write the history of the Royal Engineers from 1938 to 1948, covering the whole of World War II. Hampered by arthritis this took him almost 10 years, but the two volumes were published in 1958.

Pakenham-Walsh's name appears on a war memorial in Rathmichael Church in Shankill, County Dublin.

== Bibliography ==
- Maj A.F. Becke, History of the Great War: Order of Battle of Divisions, Part 1: The Regular British Divisions, London: HM Stationery Office, 1934/Uckfield: Naval & Military Press, 2007, ISBN 1-847347-38-X.
- Maj L.F. Ellis, History of the Second World War, United Kingdom Military Series: The War in France and Flanders 1939–1940, London: HM Stationery Office, 1954/Uckfield: Naval & Military, 2004, 978-1-85457-056-6.
- Maj-Gen R.P. Pakenham-Walsh, History of the Corps of Royal Engineers, Vol VIII, 1938–1948: Campaigns in France and Belgium, 1939–40. Norway, Middle East, East Africa, Western Desert, North West Africa, and Activities in the U.K., Chatham: Institution of Royal Engineers, 1958.
- Maj-Gen R.P. Pakenham-Walsh, History of the Corps of Royal Engineers, Vol IX, 1938–1948: Campaigns in Sicily and Italy: the War Against Japan: North-west Europe 1944º–45: Minor and Non-Operational Areas: Post-War 1945–48, Chatham: Institution of Royal Engineers, 1958.
- Smart, Nick (2005). Biographical Dictionary of British Generals of the Second World War. Barnsley, South Yorkshire: Pen and Sword Books. ISBN 1844150496.

Military offices
Preceded by Lionel Bond	Commandant of the School of Military Engineering; June–September 1939	Succeeded by E. E. B. Mackintosh
Preceded by Hubert Huddleston	GOC British Army in Northern Ireland; 1940–1941	Succeeded by Vivian Majendie
New command	GOC IX Corps; June–November 1941	Succeeded by Edwin Morris
