= Lionel Bond =

British Army general

Lieutenant-General Sir Lionel Bond KBE CB
- Born: 16 June 1884; Aldershot, Hampshire, England
- Died: 4 October 1961 (aged 77); Surrey, England
- Relatives: Major-General Sir Francis George Bond (father)
- Military career
- Allegiance: United Kingdom
- Branch: British Army
- Service years: 1903–1941
- Rank: Lieutenant-General
- Service number: 22542
- Unit: Royal Engineers
- Commands: Malaya Command (1939–1941); Royal School of Military Engineering (1935–1939); Chatham Area (1935–1939)
- Conflicts: Mohmand Expedition of 1908; First World War; Second World War
- Awards: Knight Commander of the Order of the Bath; Companion of the Order of the Bath; Mentioned in Despatches (2)

Lieutenant-General Sir Lionel Vivian Bond, KBE, CB (16 June 1884 – 4 October 1961) was a senior officer in the British Army.

== Military career ==
Bond was the son of Major-General Sir Francis George Bond (1856–1930), and elder brother of Major-General Richard Lawrence Bond (1890–1979). After attending the Royal Military Academy, Woolwich, Bond was commissioned as a second lieutenant in the Royal Engineers in 1903. He first saw action in military operations in the Mohmand Expedition of 1908. He also fought in Mesopotamia during the First World War.

Bond graduated from the first postwar course at the Staff College, Camberley in 1919. In 1922, he published a literary attack on Captain Liddell Hart's new theories on tank warfare, stigmatising them as "flapdoodle of the most misleading kind".

Bond was appointed Chief Engineer at Aldershot Command in 1934, General Officer Commanding Chatham Area in 1935, and Commandant of School of Military Engineering and Inspector of the Royal Engineers in 1938.

=== Defence of Singapore ===
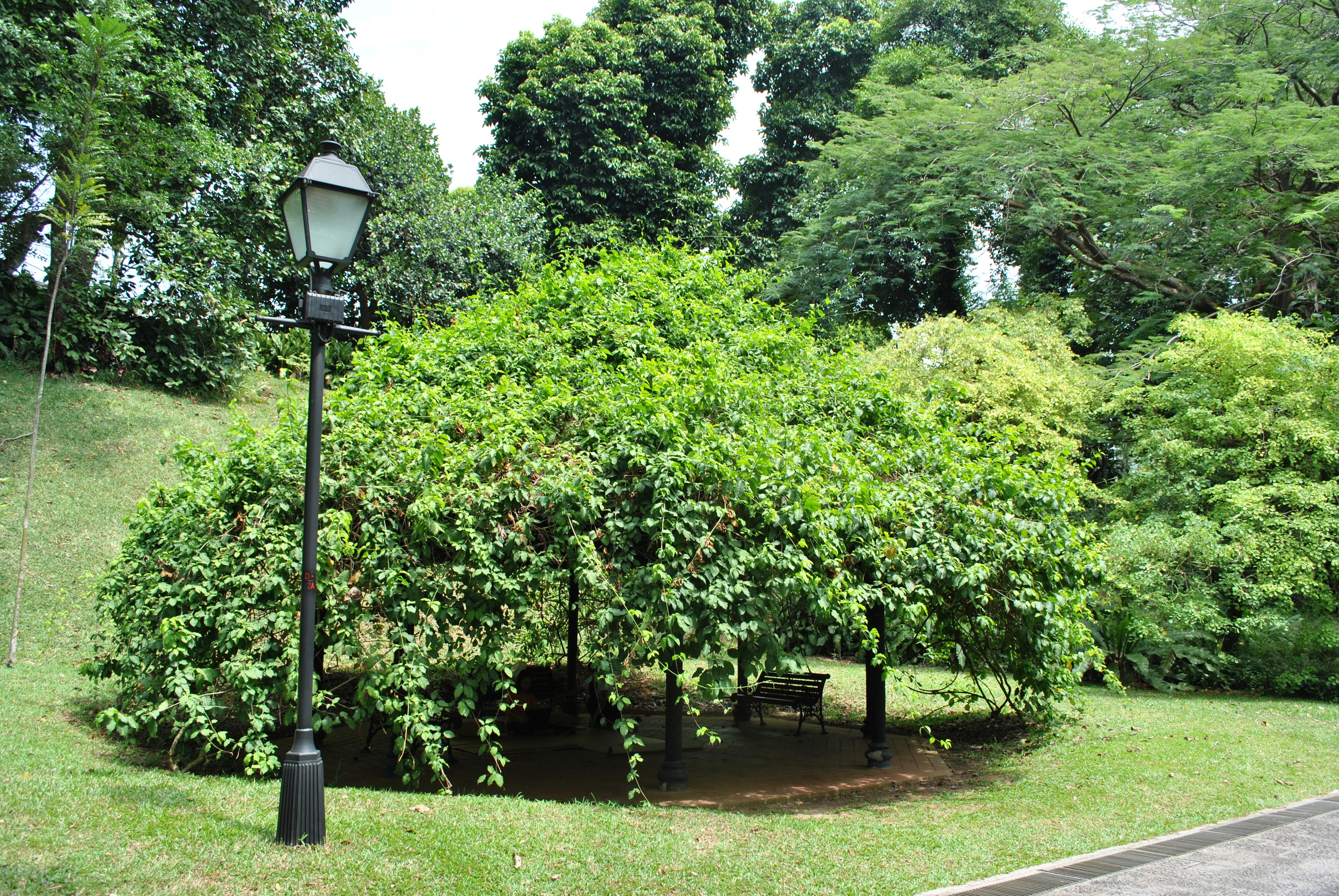
Bond Terrace, Fort Canning, Singapore

During the Second World War, Bond took over from Major General Sir William Dobbie as General Officer Commanding Malaya in July 1939. Bond was aware that his predecessor had made an assessment on the war situation in Malaya, and was convinced with his findings that the Japanese would attempt to seize Singapore by attacking Malaya from the north through Siam. With only a small number of British force in his command, he knew he could not undertake the defence of the entire Malayan Peninsula. Bond decided on a strategy of close defence of Southern Johore, and the Singapore island.

Bond completed his term of office in Malaya on 29 April 1941. He retired from active military service soon after, and died in 1961.

== Bibliography ==
- Smart, Nick (2005). Biographical Dictionary of British Generals of the Second World War. Barnsley, South Yorkshire: Pen and Sword Books. ISBN 1844150496.

Military offices
Preceded by William Dobbie	Commandant of the School of Military Engineering; 1935–1939	Succeeded by Ridley Pakenham-Walsh
Preceded by Sir William Dobbie	GOC Malaya Command; 1939–1941	Succeeded by Arthur Percival
