= Desmond Harrison =

British Army officer (1896–1984)

Major-General Desmond Harrison CB DSO
- Born: 11 November 1896
- Died: 23 June 1984 (aged 87)
- Military career
- Allegiance: United Kingdom
- Branch: British Army
- Service years: 1916–1947
- Rank: Major-General
- Service number: 15407
- Unit: Royal Engineers
- Commands: School of Military Engineering
- Conflicts: First World War; Second World War: South-East Asian theatre
- Awards: Companion of the Order of the Bath; Distinguished Service Order; Mentioned in Despatches
- Other work: Overseas Food Corporation

Major-General Desmond Harrison, CB, DSO (11 November 1896 – 23 June 1984) was a British Army officer who served in the Royal Engineers during the two world wars and was later a civil engineer.

== Career ==
Harrison was educated at Kilkenny College in Ireland and then at Mountjoy School, Dublin, before entering the Royal Military Academy, Woolwich. He was commissioned into the Royal Engineers as a second lieutenant on 26 May 1916 and afterwards undertook the Young Officers' Course at the University of Cambridge. Thereafter, he served in France during the First World War.

Harrison was posted to Army Headquarters India as a staff captain from 1935 to 1937. He was awarded the Distinguished Service Order on 11 July 1940 for gallant and distinguished service on operations, at the time he held the rank of major and acting lieutenant-colonel. Harrison was mentioned in dispatches on 29 April 1941 for service on the battlefield, by this time his promotion to lieutenant-colonel had been confirmed (in a temporary rank). He received the substantive rank on 1 April 1942.

He served as commandant of the School of Military Engineering in 1942 and engineer-in-chief to South East Asia Command in 1943, serving under Admiral Lord Mountbatten. He was promoted to acting major-general on 24 September 1943, a rank that was confirmed (as a temporary rank) on the same date the next year. Harrison's substantive rank remained unaffected until he received promotion to colonel on 8 May 1944.

After the end of the Second World War, Harrison was appointed Director of Fortifications and Works at the War Office in 1946. He was awarded the Legion of Merit (Degree of Commander) by the United States in 1947 and degree of officer in 1948. Harrison retired from the army and received the honorary rank of major-general on 8 August 1947. He remained a member of the Army Reserve and liable to recall to service until 11 November 1954.

Minister of Food John Strachey appointed Harrison as one of the first nine members of the Overseas Food Corporation on 16 February 1948. Harrison was sent to Tanganyika (now Tanzania) in East Africa as general manager of the Tanganyika groundnut scheme, a project to cultivate peanuts across vast areas of the territory and parts of British Kenya (modern-day Kenya) and Northern Rhodesia (Zambia), with the intention of extracting oils in order to reduce shortages in Britain in the aftermath of the war. The project was beset with problems and Harrison had to be repatriated to Britain with health problems. Writing of the demise of the groundnut project, author Alan Wood commented "The trouble was not that General Harrison was a stupid man or an incompetent man; he was plainly a man of great ability. The trouble was he carried a heavier burden than any man could bear". Harrison left the Overseas Food Corporation on 21 November 1949.

In retirement, Harrison held various civil engineering consultancies. Harrison was the son of a justice of the peace. He married Kathleen (née Hazley) in 1920; the couple had four children – two sons, and two daughters. Their older son, Lieutenant Richard John Michael Harrison, was commissioned into the Coldstream Guards; he was killed in action serving in north west Europe in 1945 at the age of 20.

== Bibliography ==
- Who Was Who Volume VIII: 1981–1990. London: A&C Black. 1991. p. 331. ISBN 0713633360.
- Panton, Kenneth J. (2015). Historical Dictionary of the British Empire. Lanham, Maryland, United States: Rowman & Littlefield. p. 220. ISBN 9780810878013.
- Smart, Nick (2005). Biographical Dictionary of British Generals of the Second World War. Barnsley, South Yorkshire: Pen and Sword Books. pp. 139–140. ISBN 1844150496.
- Wood, Alan (1950). The groundnut affair. London: Bodley Head.

Military offices
Preceded by Norman Coxwell-Rogers	Commandant of the School of Military Engineering; 1942–1943	Succeeded by H. T. S. King
