= Vivian Majendie =

English cricketer and British Army general (1886–1960)

Major-General Vivian Majendie CB DSO
- Born: 20 April 1886; Ipplepen, Devon, England
- Died: 13 January 1960 (aged 73); North Watford, Hertfordshire, England
- Military career
- Allegiance: United Kingdom
- Branch: British Army
- Service years: 1905–1946
- Rank: Major-General
- Service number: 1393
- Unit: Somerset Light Infantry
- Commands: Northern Ireland District (1941–43); 55th (West Lancashire) Infantry Division (1938–41); 2nd Battalion, Somerset Light Infantry (1929–33); 1st Battalion, Somerset Light Infantry (1918)
- Conflicts: First World War; Second World War
- Awards: Companion of the Order of the Bath; Distinguished Service Order
- Cricket career

Cricket information
- Batting: Right-handed
- Role: Wicket-keeper

Domestic team information
- Years: Team
- 1907–1910: Somerset

Career statistics
Competition	First-class
Matches	2
Runs scored	55
Batting average	13.75
100s/50s	0/0
Top score	28
Catches/stumpings	2/4
- Source: ESPNcricinfo, 23 October 2017

Major-General Vivian Henry Bruce Majendie, CB, DSO (20 April 1886 – 13 January 1960) was a British Army officer and amateur cricketer for Somerset County Cricket Club.

== Military career ==
The son of The Reverend Henry Majendie, Vivian Majendie was educated at Winchester College and the Royal Military College at Sandhurst. He was commissioned into the Somerset Light Infantry in 1905. He developed a career as a cricketer and played for Somerset and Devon. He served with the West African Frontier Force in Southern Nigeria from 1908 to 1913 and then in India from 1913 to 1914.

Majendie fought in the First World War, moving with his battalion to France in 1915. He married the following year, and was awarded the Distinguished Service Order (DSO) in July 1917. He ended the war in 1918 as officer commanding the 1st Battalion, Somerset Light Infantry, serving in France as part of the British Expeditionary Force (BEF). The citation for his DSO reads:

For conspicuous gallantry and devotion to duty. He commanded his battalion with the greatest skill and determination. His battalion was continuously in touch with the enemy and under heavy shell and machine-gun fire, and its grit and determination reflect the spirit of its commanding officer.

After the war, Majendie became commander of the Amiens Sub Area of France and then, after attending the Staff College, Camberley from 1920 to 1921, became brigade major for the 14th Infantry Brigade in Curragh in 1922 before becoming a General Staff Officer at the Royal Military College, Sandhurst. In 1924 he was appointed a Staff Officer to Inspector General of the West African Frontier Force and in 1929 he became commanding officer of the 2nd Battalion, Somerset Light Infantry. After attending the Imperial Defence College in 1932, he returned to the Staff College at Camberley as a General Staff Officer (GSO) in 1933 and then was made Director of Military Training at GHQ India in 1936. He was appointed General Officer Commanding (GOC) the 55th (West Lancashire) Infantry Division, a Territorial Army (TA) formation, in 1938, and the same year became Colonel of the Somerset Light Infantry, taking over from General Sir Walter Braithwaite. In 1939, with war in Europe deemed likely, the division split to form a second-line duplicate formation, the 59th (Staffordshire) Infantry Division.

Majendie served from the outbreak of the Second World War in September 1939 until June 1941 as GOC the 55th Division, which in late June 1940 was reorganised as an infantry division and served in the United Kingdom throughout the war. By now believed to be too old for field command, he relinquished command of the 55th Division to Major-General William Morgan, became GOC Northern Ireland District in 1941 and served in the War Office as President of the War Office Regular Commissions Board from 1943. He retired from the army, after a career spanning well over 40 years, in 1946 and ceased being Colonel of his regiment the following year. He became deputy lieutenant for the county of Hertfordshire in 1951.

== Bibliography ==
- Smart, Nick (2005). Biographical Dictionary of British Generals of the Second World War. Barnsley, South Yorkshire: Pen and Sword Books. ISBN 1844150496.

Military offices
Preceded by Ernest Lewin	GOC 55th (West Lancashire) Infantry Division; 1938–1941	Succeeded by William Morgan
Preceded by Ridley Pakenham-Walsh	GOC British Army in Northern Ireland; 1941–1943	Succeeded by Sir Alan Cunningham
Honorary titles
Preceded by Sir Walter Braithwaite	Colonel of the Somerset Light Infantry; 1938–1947	Succeeded by Sir John Swayne
