= William Dobbie =

British general (1879–1964)

Lieutenant-General Sir William Dobbie GCMG KCB DSO GCStJ
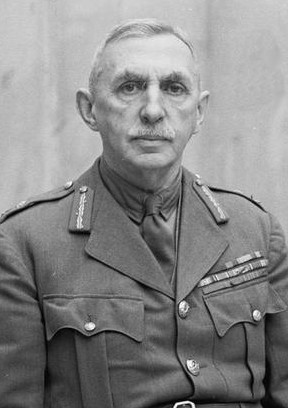
- Dobbie in 1942
- Born: 12 July 1879; Madras, British India
- Died: 3 October 1964 (aged 85); Kensington, London
- Military career
- Allegiance: United Kingdom
- Branch: British Army
- Service years: 1899–1942
- Rank: Lieutenant-General
- Service number: 6205
- Unit: Royal Engineers
- Commands: Governor of Malta (1940–1942); Malaya Command (1935–1939); School of Military Engineering (1933–1935); Cairo Brigade (1928–1932)
- Conflicts: Second Boer War; First World War; Second World War
- Awards: Knight Grand Cross of the Order of St Michael and St George; Knight Commander of the Order of the Bath; Distinguished Service Order; Mentioned in Despatches; Knight of the Legion of Honour (France); Officer of the Order of Leopold (Belgium)

Lieutenant-General Sir William George Shedden Dobbie (12 July 1879 – 3 October 1964) was a British Army officer who served in the Second Boer War and the First and Second World Wars.

== Early life ==
William was born in Madras to a civil servant father, W. H. Dobbie of the Indian Civil Service – and to a family with a long military lineage. When he was only nine months old, his parents left him in the care of relatives in England, so that he might receive an education in keeping with his family's station. At thirteen, young William won a scholarship to Charterhouse School and became a top-ranking classical scholar and a keen student of ancient military campaigns. Upon graduation, he proved to be qualified for a military career at the Royal Military Academy, Woolwich, from which, in due course, he went to the Royal School of Military Engineering at Chatham. He was commissioned a second lieutenant in the Royal Engineers on 6 August 1899.

== Second Boer War to First World War ==
Dobbie joined the Second Boer War shortly after the funeral of Queen Victoria in February 1901, and was promoted to lieutenant while in South Africa, on 1 April 1902. He was wounded, and returned to the United Kingdom shortly after the end of hostilities, arriving in Southampton in July 1902. He later opined that the Second Boer War was a rather unjust war. Following his return he was stationed at Chatham in late 1902, and was promoted to captain on 6 August 1908. He attended the Staff College, Camberley, from 1911 to 1912.

== First World War ==
Dobbie was appointed a Knight of the Legion of Honour in November 1914 and appointed a GSO 3rd Grade on 1 April 1915. and in July a GSO2, taking over from Brevet Lieutenant Colonel G. F. Boyd. He was awarded the Distinguished Service Order on 14 January 1916, promoted to major on 1 April 1916, promoted to temporary lieutenant colonel on 19 August 1916 (retroactive from 6 July 1915 on 1 January 1920) and brevetted to lieutenant colonel on 1 January 1917.

During the First World War, Dobbie happened to have been the staff officer on duty in November 1918 and his is the only signature on the cease-fire telegram that was sent to all troops. In later years, when asked what he did during the war, Dobbie would reply "I stopped the bloody thing!".

After the war Dobbie was appointed an Officer of the Order of Leopold on 21 August 1919.

== Interwar years ==
Dobbie was graded a temporary lieutenant colonel on 18 April 1920 and brevetted to colonel on 1 July 1922. He was promoted to lieutenant colonel on 1 January 1925 and to colonel on 18 January 1926. On 29 June 1928, he was appointed commander of the Cairo Brigade with the rank of brigadier, then considered a temporary rank. He was appointed a Companion of the Order of the Bath in the 1930 New Year Honours List. He reverted to his permanent rank of colonel and ceased to be employed from 15 July 1932, being placed on half-pay. On 18 February 1933, he was promoted to major general and appointed commandant of the School of Military Engineers. He was appointed general officer commanding Malaya Command on 8 November 1935, holding the post to 1939.

== Second World War ==
Dobbie, then holding the rank of major general, was informed that after Malaya he would be retired, because new War Office regulations deemed him too old for a further position. After war was declared in September, he was frustrated in his attempts to return to active service, until in April 1940, shortly after succeeding Lieutenant General Sir Aylmer Hunter-Weston as colonel commandant of the Royal Engineers, he encountered the Chief of the Imperial General Staff, Sir Edmund Ironside, who offered him the position of Governor of Malta and commander-in-chief of Malta. As acting governor, he was granted the acting rank of lieutenant-general on 27 April 1940, and was knighted as a Knight Commander of the Order of the Bath on 14 March 1941. Promoted to temporary lieutenant general on 27 April, he was confirmed as Governor of Malta on 19 May. He remained Governor of Malta until May 1942, and retired with the honorary rank of lieutenant-general on 10 November 1942.

When he arrived on Malta, its defensibility was in question because of the presumed ease with which Italy could overrun it. There were only 4 planes on the island and these had probably been overlooked. Few other than Churchill saw any strategic value in maintaining it and the commitment of the Maltese to the British cause was also questioned.

On the day Italy declared war Dobbie issued a statement to the garrison:

The decision of His Majesty's government to fight until our enemies are defeated will be heard with the greatest satisfaction by all ranks of the Garrison of Malta.
It may be that hard times lie ahead of us, but I know that however hard they may be, the courage and determination of all ranks will not falter, and that with God's help we will maintain the security of this fortress.
I call on all officers and other ranks humbly to seek God's help, and then in reliance on Him to do their duty unflinchingly.

Despite being a Protestant on a Catholic island, his faith became an asset. Admiral Cunningham, commander-in-chief of the Mediterranean Fleet, described him as "an Ironside of a man. His profound faith in the justice of our cause made a great impression on the religious Maltese. The complete and calm faith shown in the broadcasts he made nearly every evening contributed immensely towards keeping up the morale of the people".

Over the next two years, Malta was a crucial element of war in the Mediterranean. Churchill responded to Dobbie's requests for planes and reinforcements and the Malta Fortress played a key part in reducing the German supply lines in North Africa, until the Luftwaffe joined in the most intense bombardment of the war in early 1942. In two months there were 500 air raids during which 27 times the tonnage of bombs were dropped as in the Coventry Blitz.

Two attempts to relieve the island failed when supply ships were bombed in the harbour and a succession of Spitfires were picked off on the ground shortly after delivery. There also were problems in the Administrative Council in which a blame culture had emerged. Despite a visit from Dobbie's friend Lord Cranbourne, in May 1942 Churchill replaced Dobbie, who was exhausted and unwell, with Viscount Gort. Gort brought with him the George Cross that had been awarded to the island by King George VI. Dobbie himself received the Knight Grand Cross of the Order of St Michael and St George.

== Personal life and later years ==
He and his wife Sybil (nee Orde-Browne) had one daughter, also called Sybil, who was married to Percival Johnston. They also had two sons, Arthur William Granville Dobbie who died on the 19th of June 1944 aged 38 and was a member of the Royal Engineers 237th Field Company. Orde Charles Staple Dobbie was their other son. Dobbie is the great-grandfather of space entrepreneur Philip Johnston.

Dobbie was a member of the Protestant Plymouth Brethren, and when living in The Paragon, Blackheath, attended the large Brethren assembly in Nightingale Vale, Woolwich Common, London SE18. He was a member of the Board of Governors of Monkton Combe School in Somerset from 1942 to 1964.

Dobbie died on 3 October 1964 in Kensington, London, England, at the age of 85 years. He was buried in Charlton Cemetery, near the Chindit memorial of his nephew Major General Orde Wingate (1903–1944). His wife Sybil and other members of his family are also buried there.

== Dobbie's hypothesis regarding the capture of Singapore ==
In 1936, Dobbie, then general officer commanding (Malaya) stationed in Singapore, made an inquiry to find out if more forces were required on mainland Malaya to prevent the Japanese landing and capturing forward bases to attack Singapore. Percival, then his chief staff officer, was assigned the task of drawing up a tactical appreciation on how the Japanese were most likely to attack. Percival's report in late 1937 did confirm that north Malaya could serve as a base for the conquest of Singapore and Borneo. Both Dobbie and Percival made it clear that Singapore could no longer be seen as a self-contained naval base, and that its survival rested on the defence of mainland Malaya. So in May 1938, Dobbie wrote to the chief of staff:

It is an attack from the northward that I regard as the greatest potential danger to the Fortress (Singapore). Such an attack could be carried out in the northeast monsoon. The jungle is not in most places, impassable for infantry.

Dobbie added that an attack might be possible between the months of November and March, despite high winds and waves produced by the northeast monsoon. The recent landing of "5000 smuggled coolies" at this time dissolved any preconceptions that the monsoon offered protection. On the contrary, this monsoon would provide good cloud cover for the invaders.

== Sources ==
- Bradford, Ernie (1985). Siege: Malta 1940–1943. Pen & Sword Books Limited. ISBN 9781473818187.
- Holland, James (2003). Fortress Malta: An Island Under Siege 1940–1943. Orion. ISBN 9781780225975.
- Mead, Richard (2007). Churchill's Lions: a biographical guide to the key British generals of World War II. Stroud (UK): Spellmount. ISBN 978-1-86227-431-0.
- Smart, Nick (2005). Biographical Dictionary of British Generals of the Second World War. Barnsley, South Yorkshire: Pen and Sword Books. ISBN 1844150496.

Military offices
Preceded by Harry Pritchard	Commandant of the School of Military Engineering; 1933–1935	Succeeded by Lionel Bond
Preceded by Ernest Lewin	GOC Malaya Command; 1935–1939	Succeeded by Lionel Bond
Government offices
Preceded by Sir Charles Bonham-Carter	Governor of Malta; 1940–1942	Succeeded by The Viscount Gort
