= SS Narkunda =

Passenger liner ship

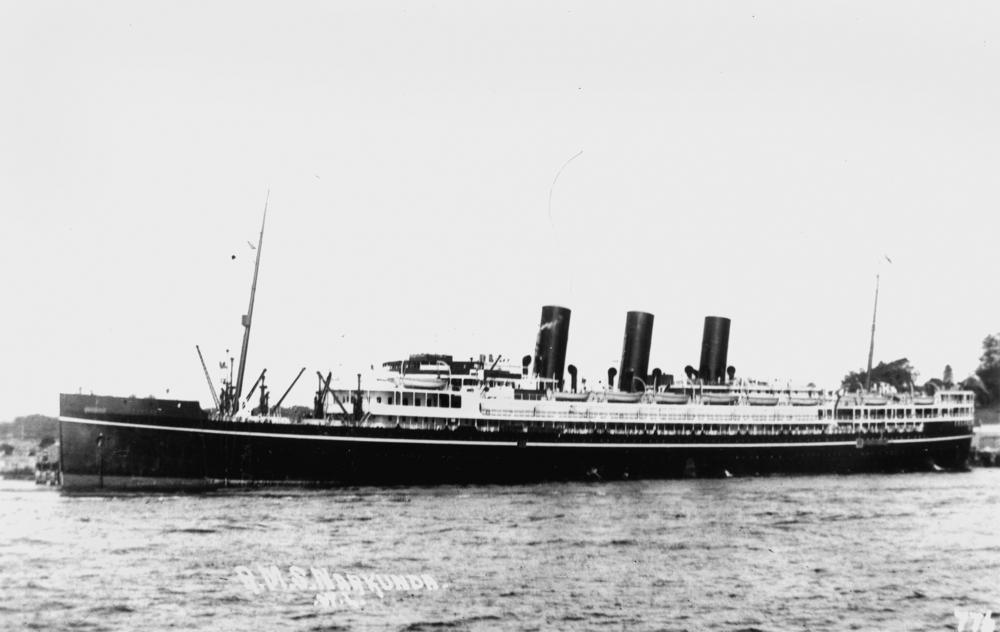

History

United Kingdom
- Name: Narkunda
- Operator: Peninsular and Oriental Steam Navigation Company (1920–1940); Royal Navy (1940–1942)
- Builder: Harland & Wolff, Belfast
- Yard number: 471
- Launched: 25 April 1918
- In service: 30 March 1920
- Fate: Sunk on 14 November 1942

General characteristics
- Type: Ocean liner
- Tonnage: 16,227 GRT
- Length: 177.22 m (581 ft 5 in)
- Beam: 21.16 m (69 ft 5 in)
- Draft: 13.4 m (44 ft 0 in)
- Installed power: 15,300 hp (11,253 kW)
- Propulsion: Quadruple expansion steam engines, 2 Propeller
- Speed: 17.5 knots (32 km/h)
- Capacity: 673 total passengers

The SS Narkunda was a passenger ship commissioned in 1920 by the British shipping company, Peninsular and Oriental Steam Navigation Company, which carried passengers and mail from Great Britain to Australia and later to the Far East. From 1940 she served as a troop ship until she was sunk on 14 November 1942, on the Algerian coast during a German air raid.

== Story ==
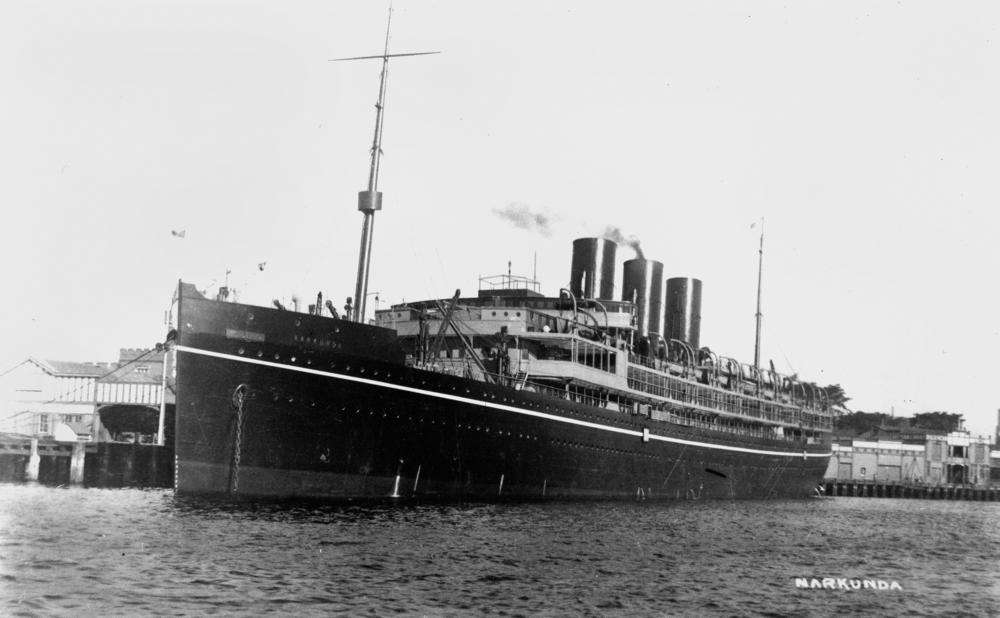
The P&O steamer Narkunda

The steamship Narkunda was ordered in 1913 and built by Harland & Wolff in Belfast, Northern Ireland. The First World War significantly delayed the construction of the ship. It was not until 25 April 1918 that the 16,227 GRT "Narkunda" could be launched at Harland & Wolff. Her sister ship, also commissioned in 1913, the SS Naldera (15,825 GRT), was built by Caird & Company in Greenock, Scotland, and was launched in December 1917.

The 177.22 meter long and 21.16 meter wide passenger and mail ship Narkunda had three funnels, two masts and two propellers and was powered by quadruple expansion steam engines, that could attain up to 17.5 knots. The passenger accommodations were designed for 426 passengers in first and 247 passengers in second class. The Narkunda and the Naldera were P&O's first three-funnelled ships, the first with a rounded cruiser stern, and also the largest ships of the shipping company up to that point. The Narkunda left on 30 March 1920 on her maiden voyage. In its early years it was used in the mail service from England via the Mediterranean to Australia. In 1927, coal was converted to oil combustion. In 1931 she was transferred to the Far East route, calling at various ports.

After the outbreak of the Second World War, the Narkunda initially continued its passenger service and called at Shanghai and Cape Town, among other places, until 1940 when it was taken over by the British Admiralty when Troopship and Auxiliary Cruiser were drafted. It was used during the Allied invasion of North Africa (see Operation Torch).

After landing Allied troops in the Algerian port city of Bougie, the Narkunda under the command of Captain L. Parfitt, DSC, was on her return journey to Great Britain. On the evening of 14 November 1942, the Narkunda was bombed by German aircraft and sunk not far from Bougie (position 46°52′N 5°01′E). 31 people lost their lives. The Narkunda was the third and final P&O ship lost in the area. Captain Parfitt survived and was later awarded the Lloyd's War Medal for Bravery at Sea.
