= Royal School of Military Engineering =

British military training institution

Royal School of Military Engineering Group
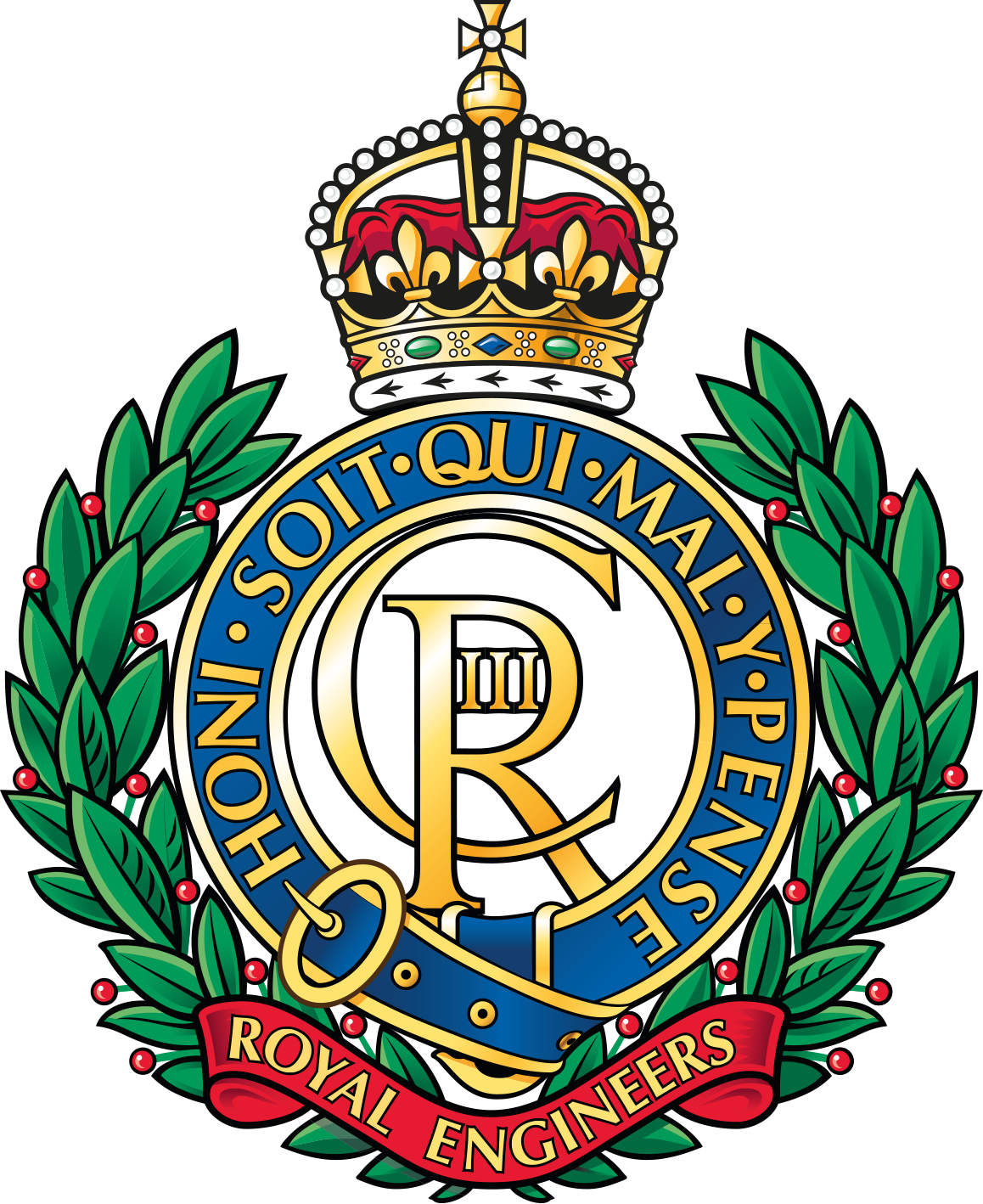
- Badge of the Royal Engineers
- Active: 1812–present
- Country: United Kingdom
- Branch: British Army
- Type: Training
- Role: Engineer Training
- Part of: Land Warfare Centre
- Garrison/HQ: Chatham, Kent; 51°23′34″N 0°32′07″E

Commanders
- Current commander: Brigadier James D. Webster

The Royal School of Military Engineering (RSME) Group provides a wide range of training for the British Army and Defence. This includes; Combat Engineers, Carpenters, Chartered Engineers, Musicians, Band Masters, Sniffer Dogs, Veterinary Technicians, Ammunition Experts, Bomb Disposal Operators, and Counter Chemical Warfare experts, as well as Command and Leadership.

== History ==
=== 19th century ===
The Peninsular War (1808–14) revealed deficiencies in the training and knowledge of officers and men in the conduct of siege operations and bridging. During this war low ranking Royal Engineers officers carried out large scale operations. They had under their command working parties of two or three battalions of infantry, two or three thousand men, who knew nothing in the art of siegeworks. Royal Engineers officers had to demonstrate the simplest tasks to the soldiers often while under enemy fire. Several officers were lost and could not be replaced and a better system of training for siege operations was required. The need for a school was highlighted by problems experienced during Wellington's Siege of Ciudad Rodrigo in January 1812 and the Siege of Badajoz in March 1812.

On 23 April 1812 an establishment was authorised, by Royal Warrant, to teach "Sapping, Mining, and other Military Fieldwork's" to the junior officers of the Corps of Royal Engineers and the Corps of Royal Military Artificers, Sappers and Miners.

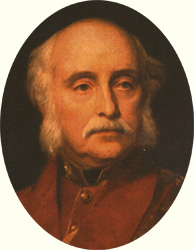
Major General Sir Charles Pasley

Captain Charles Pasley who had been pressing for such an establishment since 1809 was selected as the first Director with the rank of major and was sent to Woolwich.

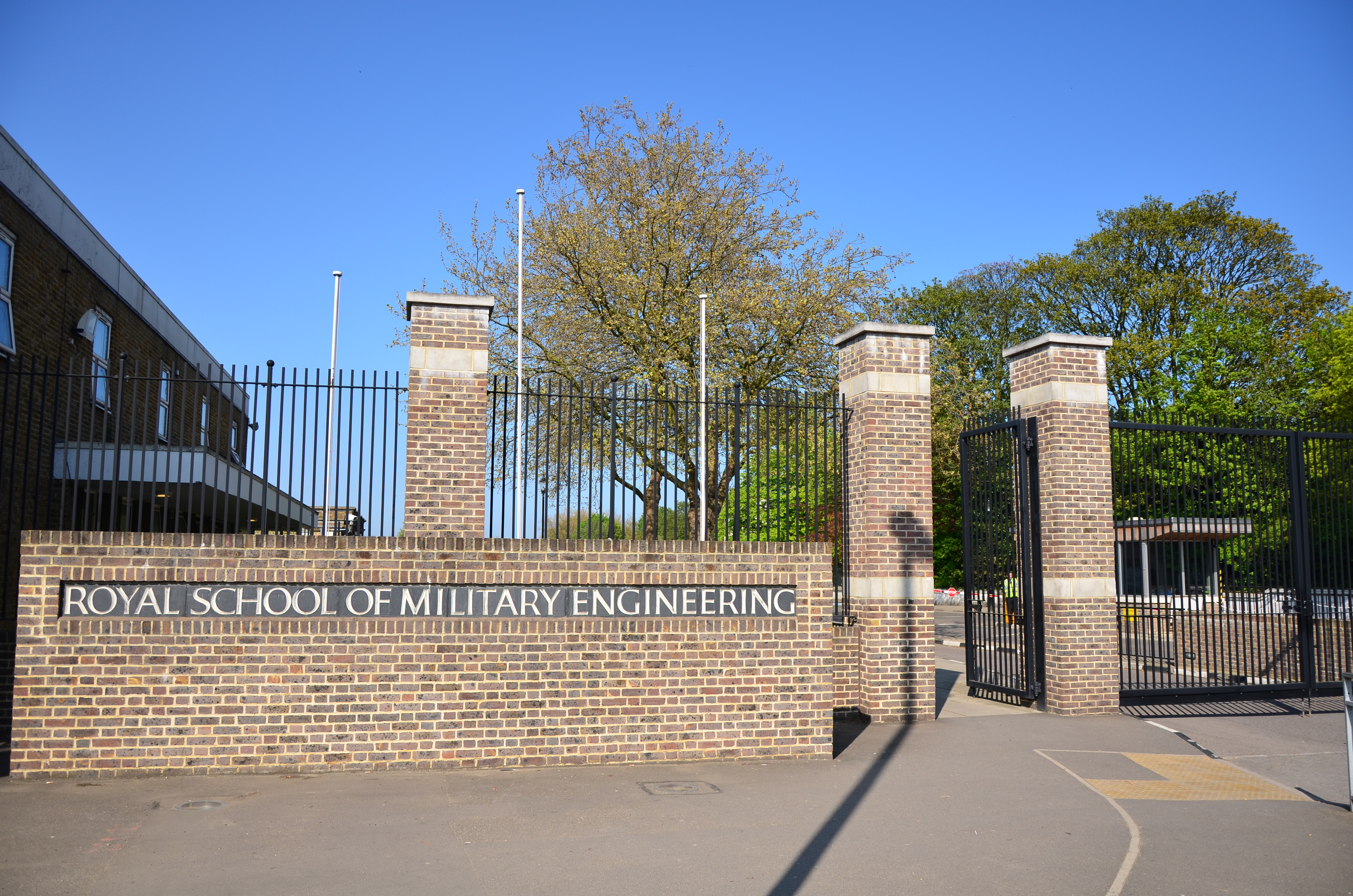
Entrance to the Royal School of Military Engineering at Brompton Barracks, Kent

In 1815 Pasley recommended that the Royal Sappers and Miners Training Depot at Woolwich be closed, to concentrate all training at Chatham which was, at that time, a strongly fortified naval town. The town was surrounded by batteries, bastions and ditches designed to be defended by 7,000 men and so provided excellent areas for training in siege operations. (Records show that there had been a military base on the high ground above Chatham built to defend Chatham Dockyard since at least 1708.) But that was not achieved until 1850 when the training Depot was moved to Brompton Barracks, Chatham. The move was made possible by the completion of the North Kent Line, which facilitated a fast transport link into London. The Headquarters of the Royal Engineers, also based in Woolwich, was not moved to Chatham until 1856.

The first courses at the Royal Engineers Establishment were done on an all ranks basis with the greatest regard to economy. To reduce staff the NCOs and officers were responsible for instructing and examining the soldiers. If the men could not read or write they were taught to do so and those that could read and write were taught to draw and interpret simple plans. The Royal Engineers Establishment quickly became the centre of excellence for all fieldworks and bridging. Pasley was keen to confirm his teaching and regular exercises were held as demonstrations or as experiments to improve the techniques and teaching of the Establishment. Public demonstrations of siege operations took place at Chatham from 1833.

In 1869 the title of the Royal Engineers Establishment was changed to "The School of Military Engineering" (SME) as evidence of its status, not only as the font of engineer doctrine and training for the British Army, but also as the leading scientific military school in Europe.

=== 20th century ===
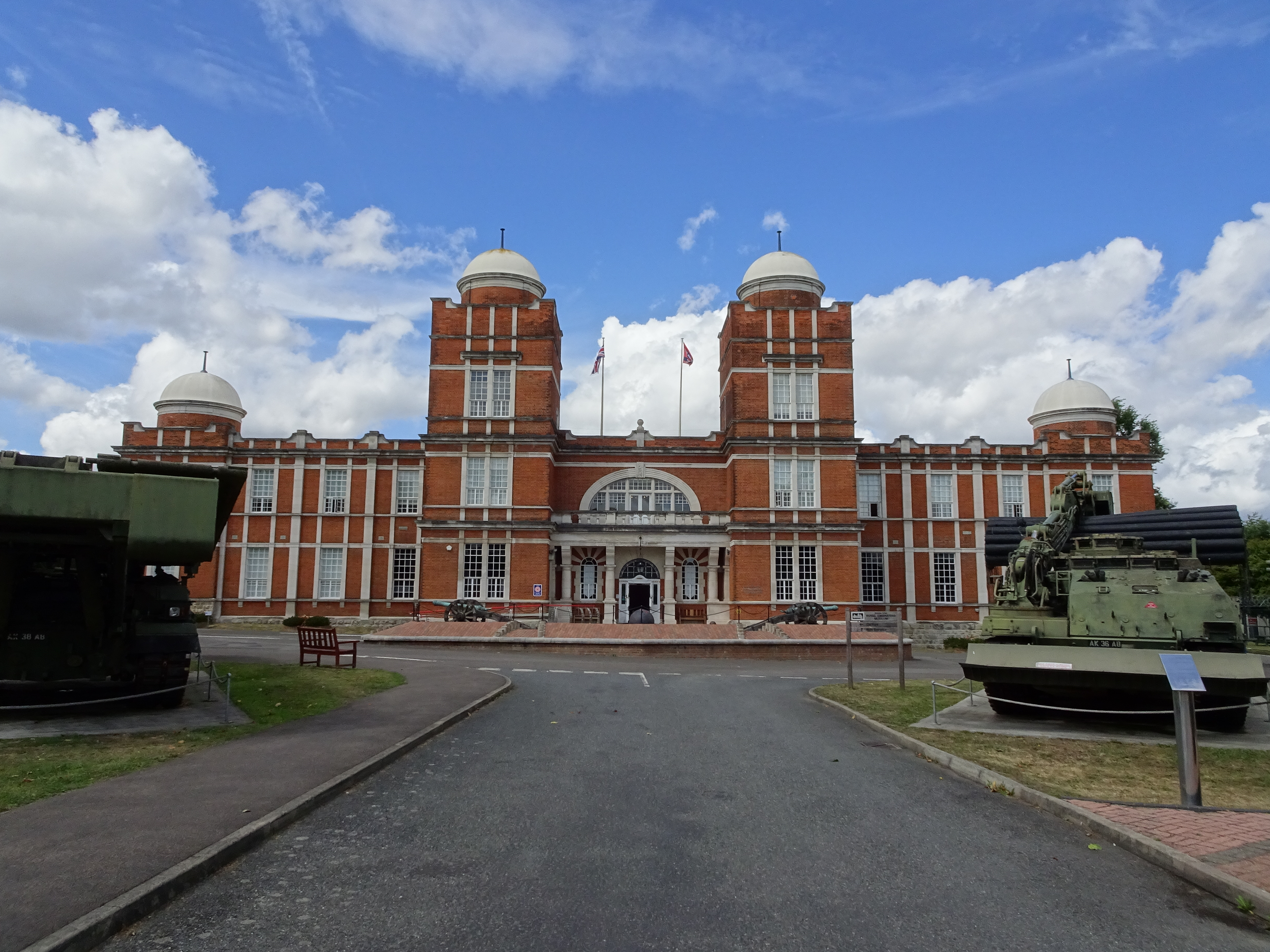
The 1905 Ravelin Building now houses the InstRE and Royal Engineers Museum.

At the start of World War I the Royal Engineer battalions based at Chatham were deployed to defend the local area. Immediately recruits started to arrive - in the first six weeks of the war 15,000 men arrived. A hundred recruits per day had been expected to arrive but they arrived at a rate of two hundred rising to a peak of nine hundred per day. The Depot coped so well with this influx that on 3 October 1914, the King and Queen paid a private visit to the Corps, 12,001 all ranks were on parade in uniform on the Great Lines.

In 1939 SME mobilised again and the Training Battalion left Chatham forming two training battalions at Harper Barracks Ripon and Shorncliffe Army Camp.

Specialist, instructor and higher trade continued at Chatham but from June 1940 training was seriously interrupted by German efforts to destroy the dockyard. Approximately 100 bombs, and one Spitfire, fell on the SME damaging buildings including the Commandant's residence. One caused heavy casualties when it burst in the basement of a barrack block. Staff and students were also required to direct the building of defences in the dockyard and the surrounding area. It was difficult to continue training under these circumstances so it was decided to look for a new site for SME. In September 1940 the decision was taken to move to Ripon.

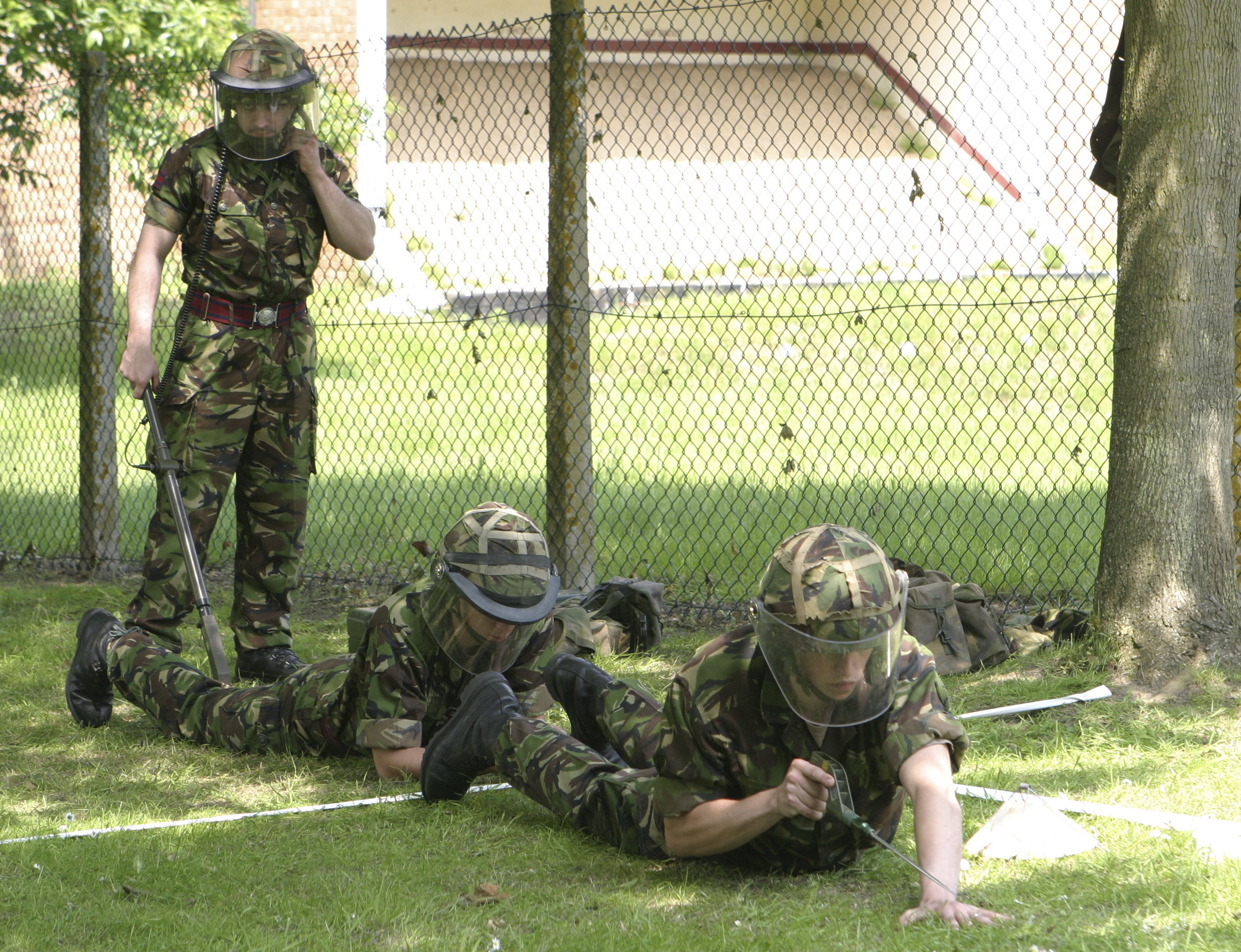
Combat Engineers of 20 Field Squadron, 36 Engineer Regiment practice landmine clearance.

In 1940 an Experimental Tunnelling Section was formed and in 1941 Assault Engineer and Bomb Disposal Schools were formed. The bomb disposal school was initially formed at Donnington but moved to Ripon in January 1942.

After the war SME remained at Ripon while a decision was made about the future location of the school. Several sites with better training facilities were considered but the Treasury could not afford the cost of providing new quarters and SME returned to Chatham. The move back was completed in March 1950. The close relationship the SME had with the civilian population led to the Corps being granted the Freedom of Ripon before the departure of the SME in July 1949. The SME was also involved in the parades granting the Freedom of Gillingham in September 1953 and of Rochester in May 1954.

In 1950 trade training courses were six months long, and these were put to good use around the barracks. By 1953 they had built Burgoyne House for the Mess Secretary and Napier House for the Institution Secretary. In 1962 the School of Military Engineering celebrated its 150th birthday, and as a birthday present Elizabeth II bestowed the Royal title on the School, becoming The Royal School of Military Engineering (RSME). This was announced by Prince Philip, Duke of Edinburgh when he visited Chatham to lay the foundation stone for a new barracks for the RSME at Chattenden Camp, to house Fieldworks, Signal and Tactics Schools and to provide accommodation for Plant, Roads and Airfields School.

=== 21st century ===
In 2006 the Defence Animal Centre came under the command of the RSME Group. Since then the Defence Explosive Ordnance Disposal, Munitions and Search Training Regiment, and the Defence Counter Chemical Biological Radiological and Nuclear Centre have all joined the RSME Group.

The Royal Corps of Army Music moved to Minley as part of the RSME Group in 2021.

On 24 July 2024 an officer in uniform was attacked by a solo knifeman outside the Brompton Barracks. It was reported in Medway Magistrates’ Court documents the next day that Lieutenant Colonel Mark Teeton was the victim of an attack by Anthony Esan. On 26 July a Nigerian news outlet claimed Esan was a 24 year old Nigerian, and said he had been charged with attempted murder. Esan's uncle was interviewed and said his nephew had travelled to the UK "to seek better opportunities".

== Curriculum history ==
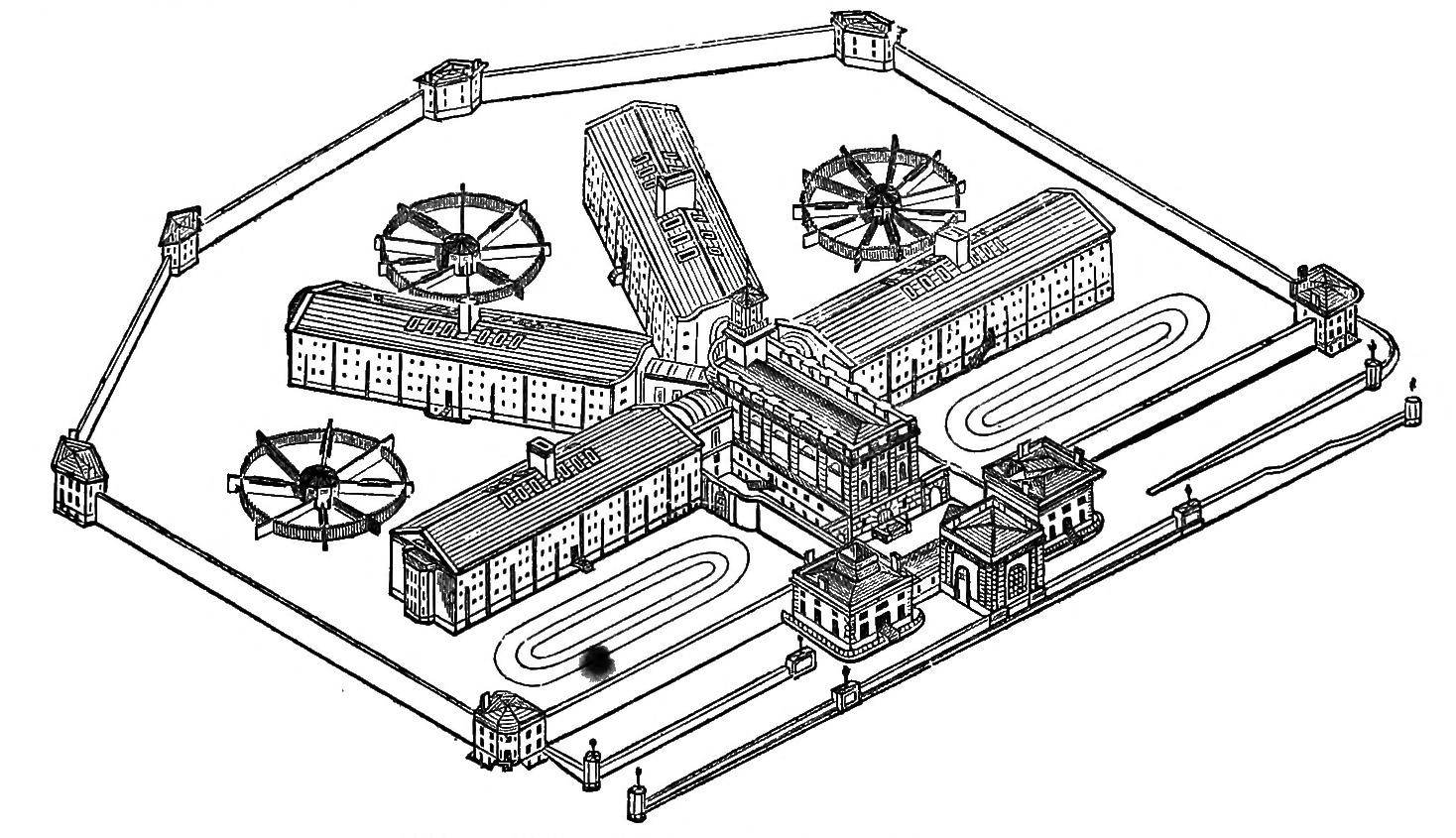
Pentonville Prison designed by Captain Joshua Jebb.

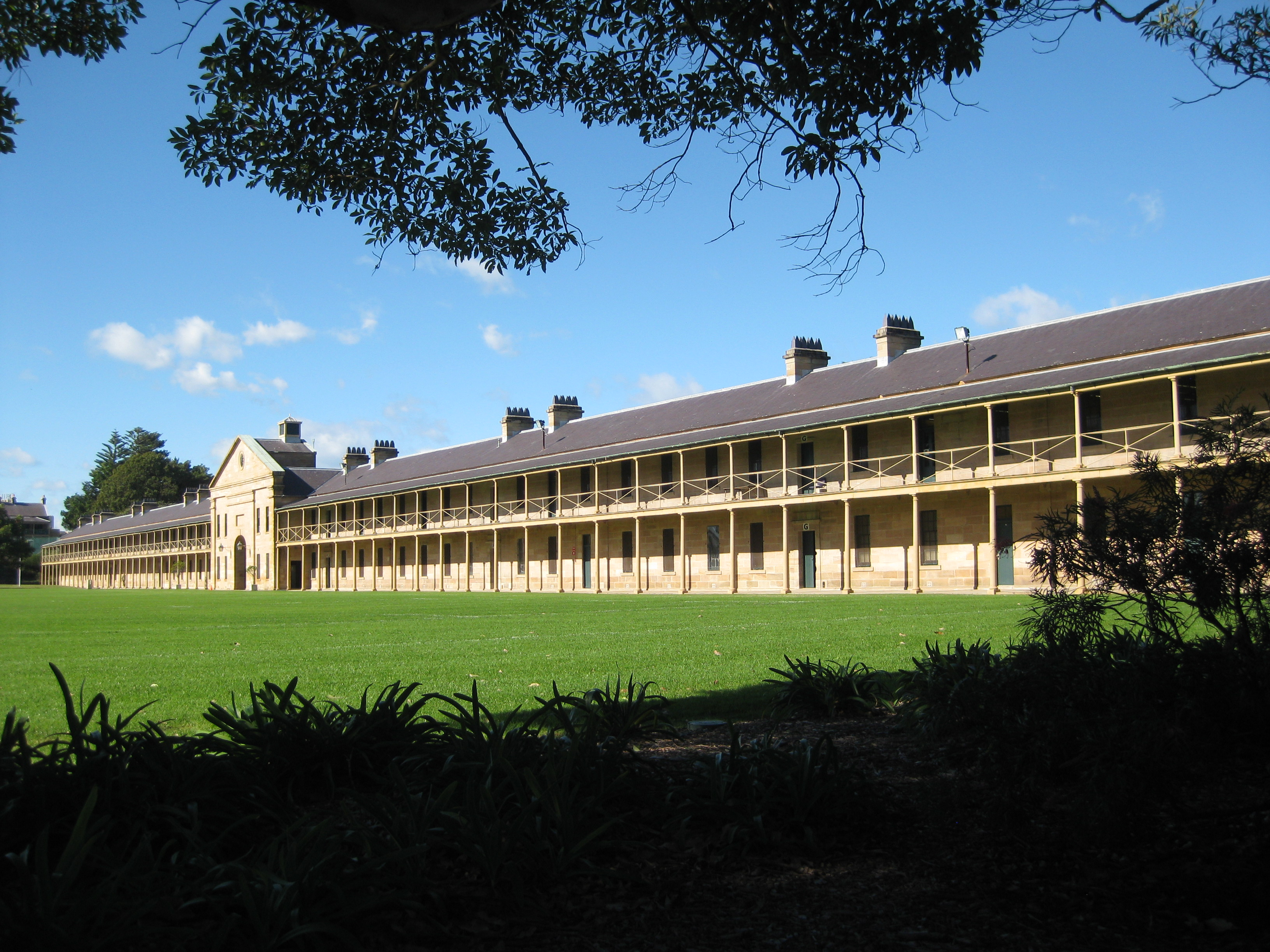
Victoria Barracks, Sydney, designed by Lieutenant Colonel George Barney.

Some of the original subjects taught and innovations included:

Field fortification This was the original course of instruction and covered: field defence, siege works, bridging, demolition. Railway work was introduced in the 1830s.

Survey First introduced in 1833, covered Technical Surveying and Military Topography. This led to officers and soldiers conducting surveys (e.g. India 1820–1947, Palestine 1865–83, and Uganda Railway 1890s) and boundary commissions throughout the world (e.g. North American 1843 and 1858, Russo-Afghan 1884, Gambia 1890, Kenya 1892 and Chile-Argentine 1902).

Electricity First introduced in the 1830s, covered battery construction, telegraphy, firing of mines, and electric light (search-lights).

Photography and Chemistry First introduced in the early 1850s just before the Crimean War (1854–56) because its potential as a method of photo-reconnaissance was seen. Captain (later Sir) William de Wiveleslie Abney, whilst acting as department head in the 1870s, invented the photolithographic process called 'Papyrotype'.

Lithography First introduced into the curriculum in the 1850s. It was invented in 1798 as a method of printing using stones.

Diving and Submarine mining This subject was of a personal interest to Pasley, who introduced it in 1838. To trained divers in coast defence, underwater demolition and guided torpedoes.

Estimating and Building Construction First introduced in the 1830s and included: building materials, sewerage, drainage, ventilation, gas and water supply, building design and architecture. Architecture was introduced in 1825.

Ballooning First introduced in the 1860s as a means of aerial reconnaissance. After the Anglo-Boer war (1899–1902) developments shifted from air balloons to fixed-wing aircraft, which eventually led to the formation of the Royal Flying Corps in 1912 and the Royal Air Force in 1918.

Mechanics Brought about with the adaptation of the steam engine for military purposes in the 1870s; this gave rise to the interest in railways, which led to the formation of the Royal Engineers Transport Section responsible for railways, waterways and ports.

== Fowke Medal ==
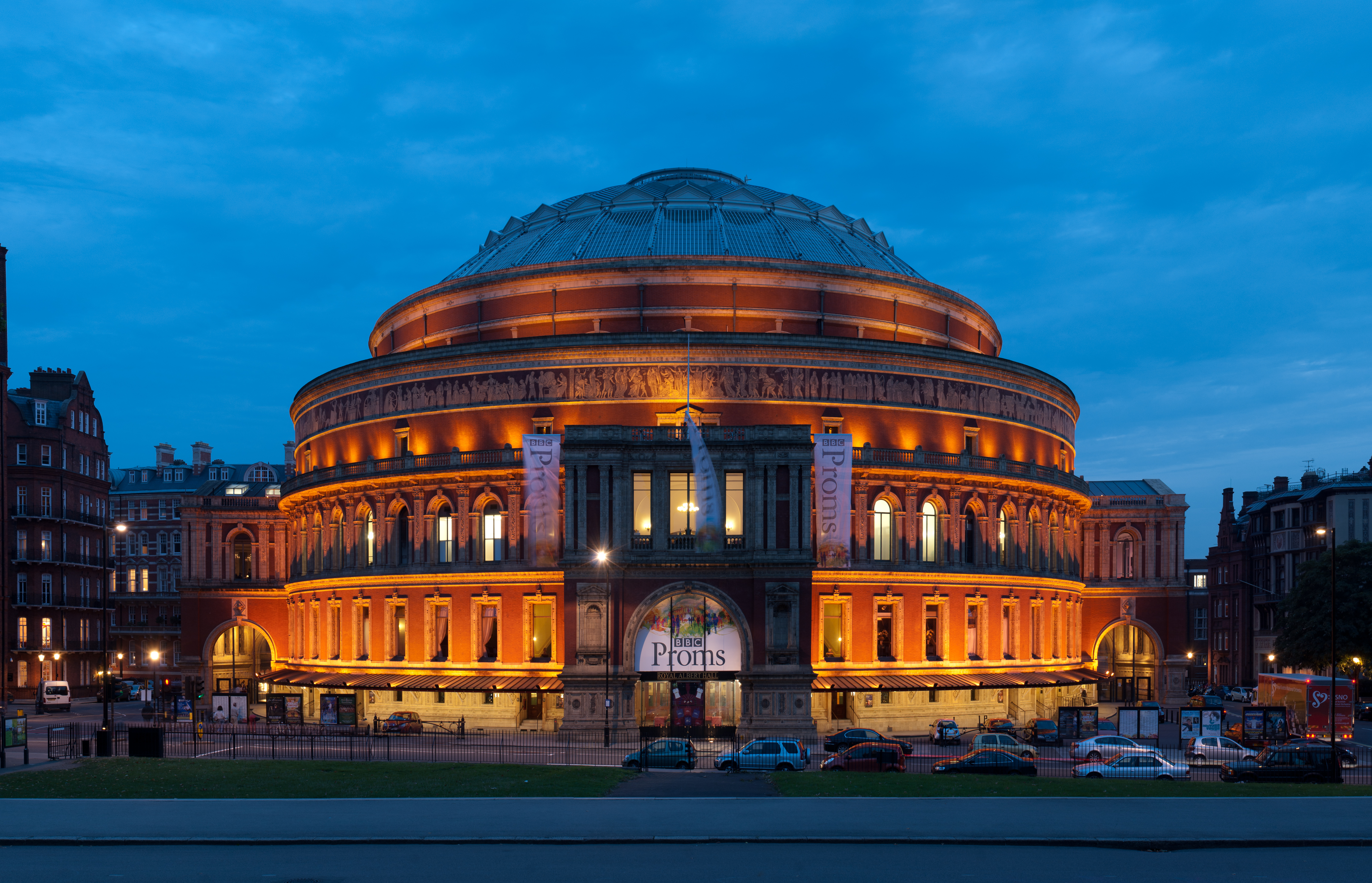
The Royal Albert Hall designed by Captain Francis Fowke, Royal Engineers.

Francis Fowke (7 July 1823 – 4 December 1865) was a British Engineer, Architect and a captain in the Royal Engineers, who was educated at the School of Military Engineering. Among his projects were the Prince Consort's Library in Aldershot, the Royal Albert Hall and parts of the Victoria and Albert Museum in London, the Royal Museum in Edinburgh, and the National Gallery of Ireland in Dublin. He was also responsible for planning the 1862 International Exhibition in London. Working on the International Exhibition building, described as 'a wretched shed' by The Art Journal.

The presentation of the Fowke Medal was instigated by the Institution of Royal Engineers in 1865, as a memorial prize for young officers who demonstrated outstanding architectural ability at the School of Military Engineering. With the demise of great architectural works the prize has been transferred and today it is reproduced in bronze and is awarded to the top student in each of the Clerk of Works (Construction), (Electrical), (Mechanical) and Military Plant Foreman's courses at the Royal School of Military Engineering (RSME).

== Brompton Barracks ==
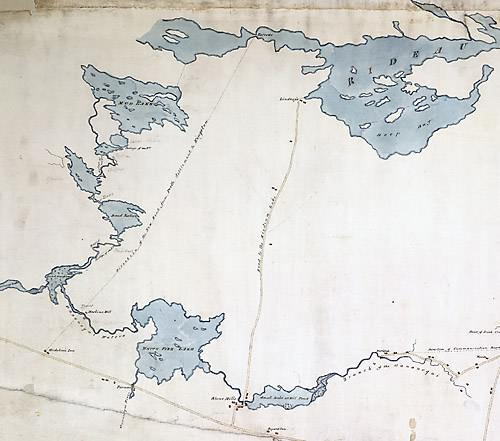
Survey of the Rideau Canal by Captain Joshua Jebb.

Records show that there has been a military base on the high ground above Chatham since at least 1708, built to defend Chatham Dockyard. Brompton Barracks forms the centrepiece of the Brompton Lines Conservation Area, an area designated in 1982 acknowledging the importance of the Chatham Dockyard as having particularly well-preserved dockyard defences.

=== Scheduled monument ===
The Brompton Lines were built in 1755–1757, during the Seven Years' War, to protect Chatham Dockyard from the landward side. The Lines were improved in the 1780s, during the American War of Independence, when a further French threat was recognised. This work included the defensive ditches with brick retaining walls that still survive today. The defences were extended to the north-east from 1803–1809, with the construction of the Lower Lines. The lines extend from Fort Amherst in the south to Purser Way in the north. The lines are a scheduled monument.

=== Listed buildings ===
The blocks flanking the Parade Square were designed by James Wyatt and completed in 1806. They comprised Brompton Barracks North, Brompton Barracks South, and Brompton Barracks West. The Crimean War Memorial Arch was designed by Sir Matthew Digby Wyatt and completed in 1856.

The foundation stone for the Headquarters building, also known as the Institute building, was laid by Prince George, Duke of Cambridge on 22 May 1872. It was designed by Sir Frederick Ommanney in the Italianate style and was completed in 1874.

The memorial to Major-General Charles Gordon was completed in 1890, while the South Africa Arch, a memorial designed by Ingress Bell to commemorate the Corps' dead and wounded of the Second Boer War was unveiled by King Edward VII on 26 July 1905. The Ravelin Building, which was designed by Major E.C.S. Moore, Royal Engineers and now forms the Corps Museum was also completed in 1905.

== Organisation ==
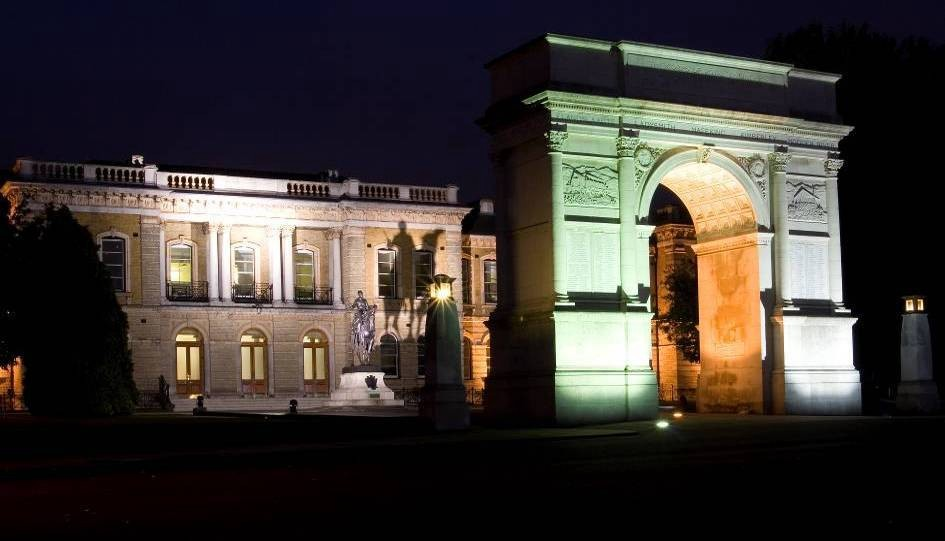
HQ Royal School of Military Engineering.

The RSME Group consists of a headquarters at Chatham, Kent and the following units:

- 1 RSME Regiment (1RSME Regt) Chatham, Kent
- 3 RSME Regiment (3 RSME Regt) Minley, Surrey
- Professional Engineer Wing (PEW) Chatham, Kent
- Royal Engineer Warfare Wing (REWW) Minley, Surrey
- Defence Animal Training Regiment (DAC) Melton Mowbray, Leicestershire
- Defence Explosive Ordnance Disposal, Munitions and Search Training Regiment (DEMS Training Regiment), Bicester and Kineton
- Royal Military School of Music (RMSM), Portsmouth
- Defence Counter Chemical Biological Radiological and Nuclear Centre (DCBRNC), Winterbourne Gunner, Wiltshire

== Training ==
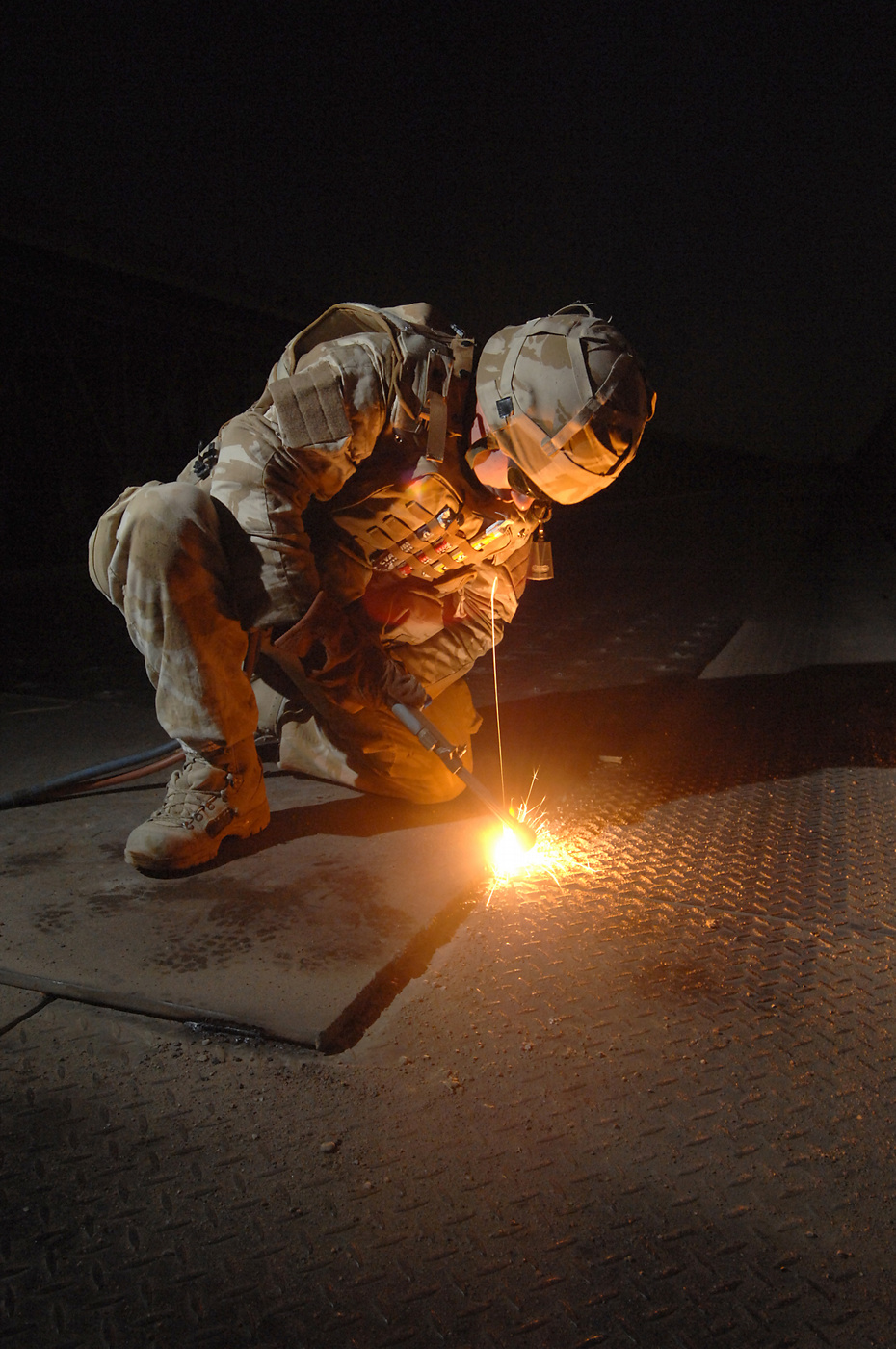
A Military Engineer - Fabricator in Iraq

=== Soldiers ===
Sappers are firstly trained as a soldier and then as a combat engineer. Many Royal Engineering trades require minimal qualifications on entry. Most trades require people to possess good practical abilities, mechanical aptitude and appetites for continuous learning.

On completion of Phase 1 training, all Royal Engineers proceed to RSME Minley to complete their Phase 2a training in which they will qualify as a combat engineer. In the 12-week long course, soldiers will learn combat engineering skills such as how to clear mines, construct bridges and cross water obstacles. On successful completion soldiers will be awarded their Royal Engineer Stable Belt and officially become a Sapper.

On completion of Phase 2a training, Sappers commence their Phase 2b training. For most trades, this will mean artisan trade training at Chatham in Kent. Course lengths vary and can last up 53 weeks at the end of which Sappers will be posted their first Regiment. For some this will include further training as a paratrooper, commando or EOD specialist. All successful graduates of their Phase 2b courses are awarded a Military Engineer Class 2 qualification for their particular trade.

At some stage during their careers, most Sappers will return to Chatham to continue their professional development. This phase of their training is known as Phase 3. Phase 3 training can be split into 3 main categories: trade training, command and leadership training, and professional engineering.

=== Officers ===
Although more than 80% of officer cadets are university graduates, some are accepted with A-Levels or equivalent qualifications, or are serving soldiers who have been selected for officer training. Age on entry must be between 17 years 9 months and 28 years. Following the 48 weeks of officer training at the Royal Military Academy Sandhurst, Royal Engineer Officers proceed to Command Wing at the RSME, where they complete a 6-month-long Troop Commanders' Course.

The course, which is split between the Minley and Chatham sites, aims to provide the Corps of Royal Engineers with trained and motivated commanders and leaders through operationally focused command and leadership training. With particular emphasis on engineering principles, doctrine and tactics, the training provides the necessary technical, supervisory and administrative knowledge to command engineer soldiers in peace and on operations. On passing the Troop Commanders' Course, officers are posted to their unit, where they will become a Troop Commander.

=== Engineers ===
The Professional Engineering Wing delivers advanced technical training to foundation degree standard for selected Junior NCOs and post-graduate learning for officers with engineering degrees to be awarded a MSc degree and be well placed to apply for Chartered Engineer (CEng) status.

== Holdfast Training Services ==
In August 2008 Holdfast Training Services Ltd signed a 30-year public-private partnership contract, worth in the region of £3 billion, with the Ministry of Defence. The contract commenced on 5 January 2009 to provide the RSME at Chatham and Minley with training, training support services and hard and soft FM services. These are provided by Babcock and three central secondary contractors: MKC Training Services, Pearson TQ and ESS. There was also a seven-year build programme undertaken by Carillion. The design, build and transition phase involved three sites and included 32 new builds, 21 refurbishments and the development of five training areas. The contract also provides limited hard FM services and IT support at Bicester. The core training capabilities delivered at the RSME (Chatham and Minley) are varied, and include: Combat and management of engineer tasks, Combat Engineering, Artisan, Technical and professional Engineering, Communication, Watermanship, and Driving specialist engineer vehicles.

== Commandants ==
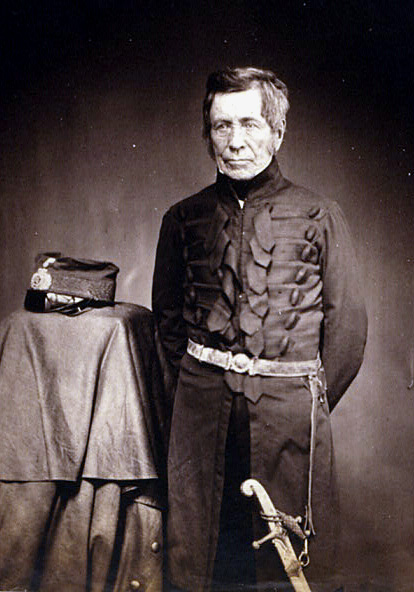
Field Marshal Sir John Fox Burgoyne, 1st Baronet

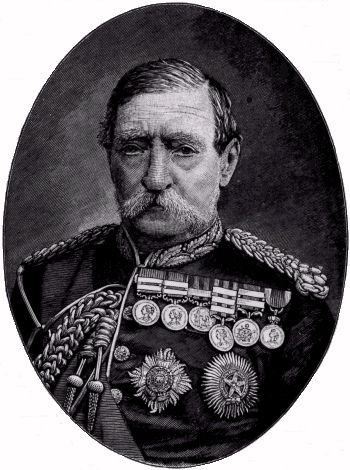
Field Marshal Robert Napier, 1st Baron Napier of Magdala

Lieutenant-General (as he then was) Sir John Fox Burgoyne was appointed the Colonel Commandant of the Royal Engineers on 22 November 1854.

General Sir Robert Napier, 1st Baron Napier of Magdala was appointed in 1874 colonel-commandant of the Royal Engineers.

Commandants of the RSME have included:

- Major-General Henry Thuillier: November 1919–November 1923
- Major-General Philip Grant: November 1923–June 1927
- Major-General George Walker: June 1927–February 1931
- Major-General Harry Pritchard: February 1931–February 1933
- Major-General William Dobbie: February 1933–November 1935
- Major-General Lionel Bond: November 1935–June 1939
- Major-General Ridley Pakenham-Walsh: June–September 1939
- Brigadier Ernest Mackintosh: –June 1940
- Brigadier Rawdon Briggs: June–December 1940
- Brigadier Maurice Luby: December 1940–November 1941
- Brigadier Norman Coxwell-Rogers: November 1941–August 1942
- Brigadier Desmond Harrison: August 1942–September 1943
- Brigadier Horace King: September 1943–October 1945
- Brigadier Bryan Godfrey-Faussett: October 1945–September 1948
- Brigadier Basil Davey: September 1948–July 1951
- Brigadier C.E.A. Browning: October 1951–August 1954
- Brigadier Harold Eking: August 1954–September 1956
- Brigadier Gerald Duke: September 1956–September 1959
- Brigadier Edward Parker: September 1959–1962
- Brigadier James Carr: September 1962–March 1965
- Brigadier Ian Lyall Grant: March 1965–March 1967
- Brigadier William Inglis: March 1967–March 1970
- Brigadier Stephen Goodall: March 1970–February 1973
- Brigadier John Purser: February 1973–December 1975
- Brigadier George Sinclair: December 1975–December 1977
- Brigadier C. Jeremy Rougier: December 1977–December 1979
- Brigadier A.Christopher Lloyd: December 1970–February 1982
- Brigadier Graham Fawcus: February 1982–December 1983
- Brigadier John Barr: December 1983–December 1985
- Brigadier David Grove: December 1985–October 1987
- Brigadier John Lucken: October 1987–December 1989
- Brigadier Anthony Pigott: December 1989–April 1992
- Brigadier P. John Russell-Jones: April 1992–November 1994
- Brigadier Robert Pridham: November 1994–January 1998
- Brigadier D. Robert Burns: January 1998–October 2000
- Brigadier Christopher Sexton: October 2000–May 2003
- Brigadier John Wootton: June 2003–June 2006
- Brigadier Anthony Harking: June 2003–March 2009
- Brigadier Nicholas Baveystock: March 2009–August 2011
- Brigadier Stephen Hodder: August 2011–August 2013
- Brigadier David Southall: August 2013–October 2016
- Brigadier Matthew Bazeley: October 2016–September 2019
- Brigadier Peter Rowell: September 2019–February 2022
- Brigadier Guy Boxall: February 2022–Present
- Brigadier James Webster: November 2023–present
