= Harry Pritchard (British Army officer) =

British Army general

Major-General Harry Pritchard CB CMG DSO
- Born: 16 November 1871
- Died: 14 May 1953 (aged 81)
- Military career
- Allegiance: United Kingdom
- Branch: British Army
- Service years: 1891–1933
- Rank: Major-General
- Service number: 23202
- Commands: Royal School of Military Engineering (1931–33); Malaya Command (1929–31)
- Conflicts: Fourth Anglo-Ashanti War; Mahdist War; Second Boer War; First World War
- Awards: Companion of the Order of the Bath; Companion of the Order of St Michael and St George; Distinguished Service Order; Mentioned in Despatches (7); Order of the Medjidie, Fourth Class (Ottoman Empire); Medal of Military Merit (Greece)

Major-General Harry Lionel Pritchard, CB, CMG, DSO (16 November 1871 – 14 May 1953) was a British Army officer who served as General Officer Commanding Malaya Command from 1929 to 1931.

== Military career ==
Pritchard was the son of Colonel Hurlock Pritchard, of Camberley, and was educated at Charterhouse School. He was commissioned into the Royal Engineers in 1891. He took part in the Fourth Anglo-Ashanti War in 1895 and was then transferred to the Egyptian Army in 1896, taking part in the Siege of Khartoum the following year. He was awarded the Distinguished Service Order for service in the Sudan.

Pritchard served in the Second Boer War in 1899 and then became a Deputy Assistant Director at the War Office in 1904. He was appointed Deputy Assistant Quartermaster General in India in 1907.

Pritchard served in the First World War, initially in France and Belgium and then in Egypt. He was made Chief Engineer for Middle East Forces in 1916, and was severely wounded in 1917.

After the war, he was appointed Chief Engineer at Northern Command in 1921 and then Assistant Director for Fortifications and Works at the War Office in 1923.

In 1926, he was appointed Chief Engineer for Eastern Command and, in 1929, he became General Officer Commanding Malaya Command. He relinquished this assignment in February 1931 and his final appointment was as commandant of the School of Military Engineering at Chatham, Kent in February 1931.

He retired from the army in 1933.

== Family ==
Pritchard married Elizabeth Gilbert Furse, daughter of E. Furse, of Alphington, Frimley, at the parish church, Frimley, on 3 September 1902.

== Bibliography ==
- A. R. P. and high explosive by Harry Lionel Pritchard, 1938, Duckworth

Military offices
Preceded by Sir Casimir van Straubenzee	GOC Malaya Command; 1929–1931	Succeeded by Sir Louis Oldfield
Preceded by George Walker	Commandant of the School of Military Engineering; 1931–1933	Succeeded by William Dobbie
