= 9th Infantry Division (India) =

Infantry division of the British Indian Army during World War II

9th Indian Infantry Division
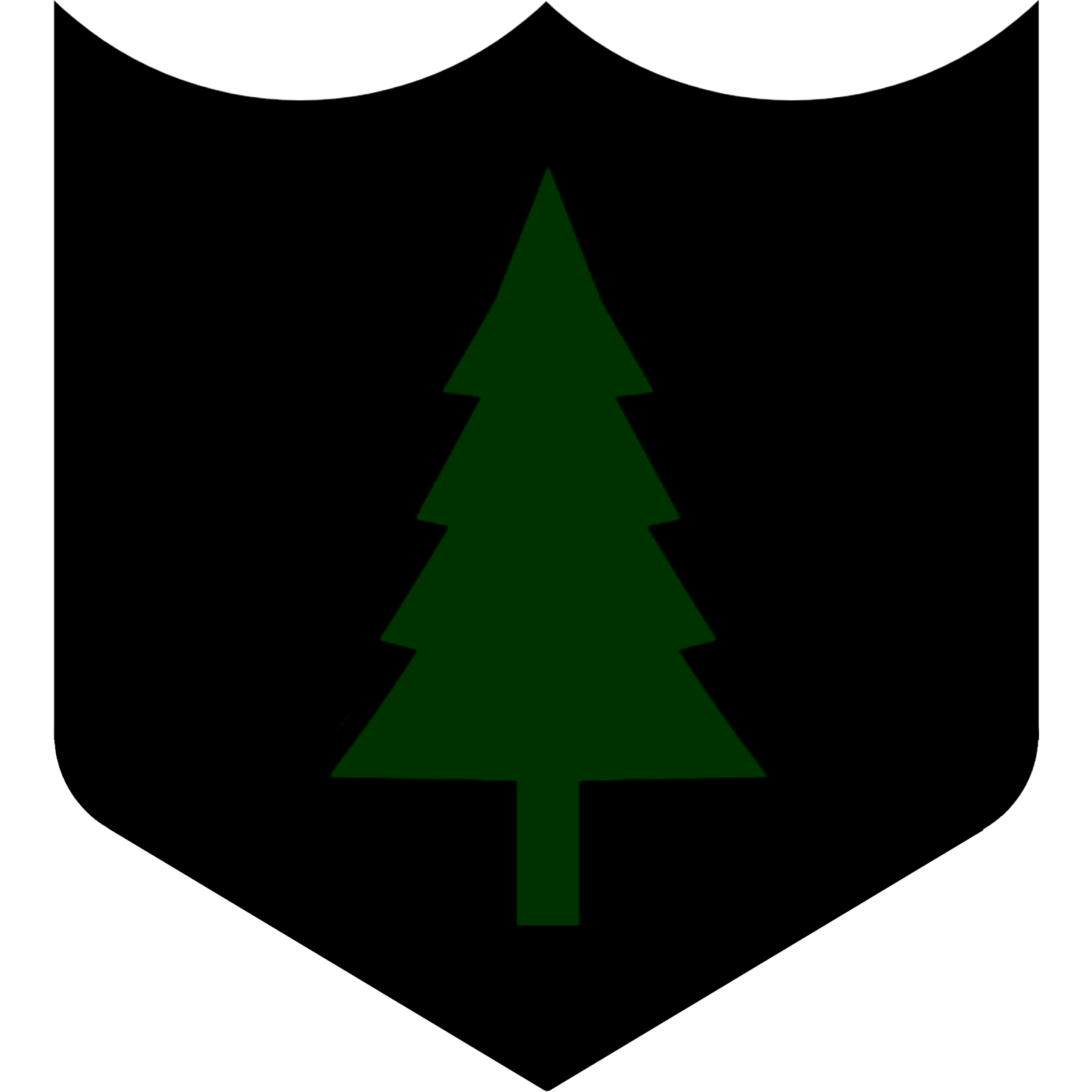
- Formation badge of the 9th Indian Infantry Division.
- Active: 15 September 1940 – 15 February 1942 (Surrendered)
- Country: (British Raj) British India
- Allegiance: British Empire
- Branch: British Indian Army
- Type: Infantry
- Size: Division
- Engagements: Battle of Malaya; Battle of Kota Bharu

Commanders
- Notable Commander: Arthur Edward Barstow

The 9th Indian Infantry Division was an infantry division of the Indian Army during World War II. The division formed part of Indian III Corps in the Malaya Command during the Battle of Malaya. It was commanded by Major-General Arthur Edward Barstow.

== History ==
The 9th Indian Infantry Division was formed on 15 September 1940 at Quetta, India before being transferred to Malaya. On 15 September 1940 the three original brigades of the division were the 15th, 20th, and 21st Indian Infantry Brigades. The 3/17th Dogra Regiment from the 9th Division was the first British Commonwealth Army unit to see action against the Japanese at the Battle of Kota Bharu on 8 December 1941. The 9th Indian Division fought a relatively successful defensive retreat down Malaya's east coast until the 22nd Brigade was cut off from the rest of the division at a demolished railway bridge near the village of Layang Layang in the state of Johore. Major-General Barstow was killed crossing the bridge, while attempting to contact the brigade. The 22nd Brigade was destroyed whilst trying to find another way to Singapore.

What was left of the division was amalgamated with the 11th Indian Division.

== Component Units 1941 – 1942 ==
8th Indian Infantry Brigade – Brigadier Berthold Wells (Billy) Key

- 3/17th Dogra Regiment – Lieut.Col George Alan Preston DSO (WIA at Kota Bharu)
- 2/10th Baluch Regiment – Lieut.Col James Frith
- 2/12th Frontier Force Regiment (2nd Sikhs) – Lieut.Col Arthur Cumming V.C.
- 1st Mysore Infantry (Indian States Forces) – Lieut.Col K.H.Preston
- 1st Hyderabad Infantry (Indian States Forces) – Lt.Col Charles Albert "Clive" Hendrick (KIA at Kota Bharu)

22nd Indian Infantry Brigade – Brigadier George Painter

- Brigadier Painter
- 2/18th Royal Garhwal Rifles – Lt.Col L.H.Cockram/ Lt.Col G.E.R.S.Hartigan
- 5/11th Sikh Regiment – Lieut.Col John Parkin/ MacAdam
- 1/13th Frontier Force Rifles – Lieut.Col Clarence Gilbert

=== Support Units ===
- CRA – Brigadier E.W. Goodman
- 5th Field Regt. – Lieut.Col E.W.F.Jephson Royal Artillery (16x4.5-inch Howitzers)
- 88th Field Regt. – Lieut.Col Sylvain Claude D'Aubuz Royal Artillery (24x25pdrs)
- 80th Anti-Tank Regt. – Lieut.Col W.Napier Royal Artillery (48x2pdrs/47mm Bredas)
- 21st Mountain Battery, IA – Major J.B.Soper IA (4xQF 3.7-inch mountain howitzers)

== Books ==
- Cole, Howard (1973). Formation Badges of World War 2. Britain, Commonwealth and Empire. London: Arms and Armour Press.
- Alan Jeffreys; Duncan Anderson (2005). British Army in the Far East 1941–45. Osprey Publishing. ISBN 1-84176-790-5.
- Colin Smith (2006). Singapore Burning. England: Penguin Books. ISBN 978-0-14-101036-6.
- Tsuji, Masanobu (1997). Japan's Greatest Victory, Britain's Worst Defeat. Margaret E. Lake, tr. New York: Da Capo Press. ISBN 1-873376-75-8.
