= John Barstow =

John Barstow may refer to:

- John L. Barstow (1832–1913), governor of Vermont
- John Anderson Barstow (1893–1941), British Army officer
- John Barstow (1937–2024), English pianist and teacher
