= 52nd Sikhs (Frontier Force) =

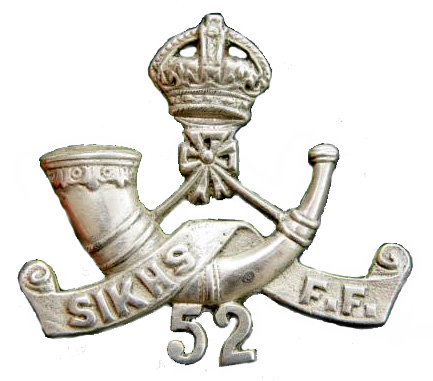
- Active: 1846–1922
- Country: British India
- Branch: British Indian Army
- Type: Infantry
- Size: 1 Battalion
- Nicknames: Dogra Paltan, Tunpur Bwanja
- Uniform: Drab; faced scarlet
- Engagements: North West Frontier of India; Second Sikh War 1848-49; India Mutiny 1857-58; Second Afghan War 1878-80; Expedition to Somaliland 1902-03; First World War 1914-18; Iraqi Revolt 1920

Commanders
- Notable commanders: Brig AE Cumming, VC, OBE, MC

The 52nd Sikhs (Frontier Force) was an infantry regiment of the British Indian Army. It was raised in 1846 as the 2nd Regiment of Infantry The Frontier Brigade. It was designated as the 52nd Sikhs (Frontier Force) in 1903 and became 2nd Battalion (Sikhs) 12th Frontier Force Regiment in 1922. In 1947, it was allocated to the Pakistan Army, where it continues to exist as 4th Battalion The Frontier Force Regiment.

== Early history ==
The regiment was raised on 22 December 1846 at Kangra as the 2nd Regiment of Infantry The Frontier Brigade by Major JWV Stephen. It was composed mostly of Dogras, with some Pathans and Gurkhas, which prompted its title of 'Hill Corps'. In 1847, it was designated 2nd (or Hill) Regiment of Sikh Local Infantry, becoming the 2nd (or Hill) Regiment of Sikh Infantry in 1857. In 1851, the regiment became part of the Punjab Irregular Force, which later became famous as the Punjab Frontier Force or The Piffers. The Piffers consisted of five regiments of cavalry, eleven regiments of infantry and five batteries of artillery besides the Corps of Guides. Their mission was to maintain order on the Punjab Frontier; a task they performed with great aplomb. The 2nd Sikh Infantry took part in numerous frontier operations besides the Second Sikh War of 1848-49 and the Great Indian Mutiny of 1857–58, when it served in Hazara and Murree Hills. During the Second Afghan War of 1878–80, the regiment fought in the Battles of Ahmad Khel and Kandahar. In 1902, it went to British Somaliland to suppress the resistance movement led by Diiriye Guure of the Dervish State.

== 52nd Sikhs (Frontier Force) ==
Subsequent to the reforms brought about in the Indian Army by Lord Kitchener in 1903, the regiment's designation was changed to 52nd Sikhs (Frontier Force). In 1914, the regiment's class composition was three companies of Dogras, two each of Pathans and Sikhs, and one of Punjabi Muslims. During First World War, the regiment joined the 18th Indian Division in Mesopotamia in 1917 and fought in the Battle of Sharqat. It moved to Kurdistan in 1919 and took part in suppressing the Iraqi Revolt of 1920.

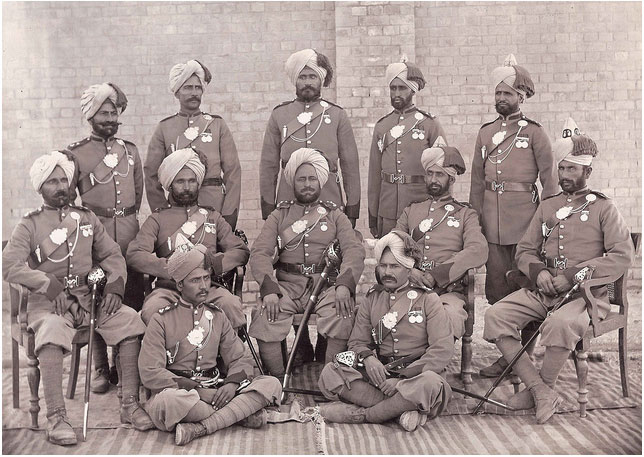
Indian Officers, 52nd Sikhs (Frontier Force), Kohat, 1905.

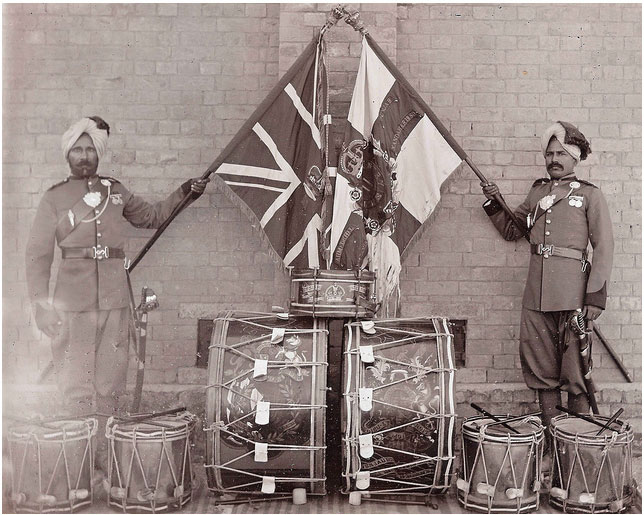
With regimental flags, Kohat, 1905.

== Subsequent History ==
Regimental photograph of Major General Alexander Eustace DSO with men of the 52nd Sikhs (Frontier Force), Dias Studios, Jubbulpor [alt. spelt 'Jabalpur' or 'Jubbulpore'], ca.1920's.

After the First World War, the 52nd Sikhs were grouped with the 51st, 53rd and 54th Sikhs, and the two battalions of Guides Infantry to form the 12th Frontier Force Regiment in 1922. The 52nd Sikhs became 2nd Battalion (Sikhs) of the new regiment.

During the Second World War, 2 FF fought with distinction in the Malayan Campaign, where its Commanding Officer Lieutenant Colonel Arthur Edward Cumming, was awarded the Victoria Cross for outstanding valour. The battalion was captured by the Japanese after the British surrender at Singapore in February 1942. It was re-raised in 1946.

In 1947, the Frontier Force Regiment was allotted to Pakistan Army. 2 FF was back in action in 1948, when it fought in the Kashmir War against India.

In 1956, the Frontier Force Rifles and the Pathan Regiment were merged with the Frontier Force Regiment, and 2 FF was redesignated as 4 FF.

During the Indo-Pakistan War of 1965, the battalion fought in the Sialkot Sector, while during the Indo-Pakistan War of 1971, it fought with great courage in the Battle of Hilli in East Pakistan. For exceptional valour, Major Muhammad Akram was awarded the Nishan-i-Haider, Pakistan's highest gallantry award.

== Genealogy ==
- 1846 2nd Regiment of Infantry The Frontier Brigade
- 1847 2nd (or Hill) Regiment of Sikh Local Infantry
- 1857 2nd (or Hill) Regiment of Sikh Infantry
- 1857 2nd (or Hill) Regiment of Sikh Infantry, Punjab Irregular Force
- 1865 2nd (or Hill) Regiment of Sikh Infantry, Punjab Frontier Force
- 1901 2nd (or Hill) Sikh Infantry
- 1903 52nd Sikhs (Frontier Force)
- 1922 2nd Battalion (Sikhs) 12th Frontier Force Regiment
- 1945 2nd Battalion (Sikhs) The Frontier Force Regiment
- 1947 2nd Battalion The Frontier Force Regiment
- 1956 4th Battalion The Frontier Force Regiment

== See also ==
- The Frontier Force Regiment
- 12th Frontier Force Regiment
- Punjab Irregular Force
