= 69th Infantry Brigade (United Kingdom) =

Infantry brigade of the British Army during World War II

69th Brigade 69th Infantry Brigade
- Active: 1914–1919; 1939–1946
- Country: United Kingdom
- Branch: British Army
- Type: Infantry
- Size: Brigade
- Part of: 23rd Division; 23rd (Northumbrian) Division; 50th (Northumbrian) Infantry Division
- Engagements: Battle of France (1940); Battle of Gazala; Second Battle of El Alamein; El Agheila; Mareth Line; Wadi Akarit; Enfidaville; D Day; Operation Perch; Operation Market Garden

Commanders
- Notable commanders: Archibald Bentley Beauman

The 69th Infantry Brigade was an infantry brigade of the British Army in the Second World War. It was a second-line Territorial Army formation, and fought in the Battle of France with the 23rd (Northumbrian) Division. The brigade was later part of the 50th (Northumbrian) Infantry Division. It went on to fight in the North African campaign, the Allied invasion of Sicily, the Normandy landings and the North West Europe campaign.

== Order of Battle ==
=== First World War ===
- 11th Battalion, Prince of Wales's Own (West Yorkshire Regiment)
- 8th Battalion, Alexandra, Princess of Wales's Own (Yorkshire Regiment)
- 9th Battalion, Alexandra, Princess of Wales's Own (Yorkshire Regiment)
- 11th Battalion, Duke of Wellington's (West Riding Regiment)
- 69th Machine Gun Company, Machine Gun Corps (formed 4 March 1916, moved to 23rd Battalion, Machine Gun Corps 1 April 1918)
- 69th Trench Mortar Battery (formed 13 June 1916)

=== Second World War ===
69th Infantry Brigade was constituted as follows during the war:

- 5th Battalion, East Yorkshire Regiment
- 6th Battalion, Green Howards
- 7th Battalion, Green Howards
- 69th Infantry Brigade Anti-Tank Company (formed 1 September 1940, disbanded 1 January 1941)
- 69th Infantry Brigade Support Company (from 16 May 1943, left 31 December 1943)

== Commanders ==
The following officers commanded 69th Infantry Brigade during the war:

- Brigadier Viscount Downe
- Brigadier J.A. Barstow
- Brigadier G.W.E.J. Erskine (later C.O. British 7th Armoured Division)
- Brigadier L.L. Hassall
- Brigadier Edward Cunliffe Cooke-Collis
- Brigadier Fergus Y.C. Knox
- Brigadier J.M.K. Spurling
- Brigadier A.G.B. Stanier

== North Africa ==
In April 1941 the 69th Brigade, as part of 50th (Northumbrian) Infantry Division, was dispatched to the Middle East first via Cyprus, Iraq, Syria, Egypt and then into Libya as part of XIII Corps in the British Eighth Army which was one of the best-known formations in the Second World War.

=== Battle of Gazala ===
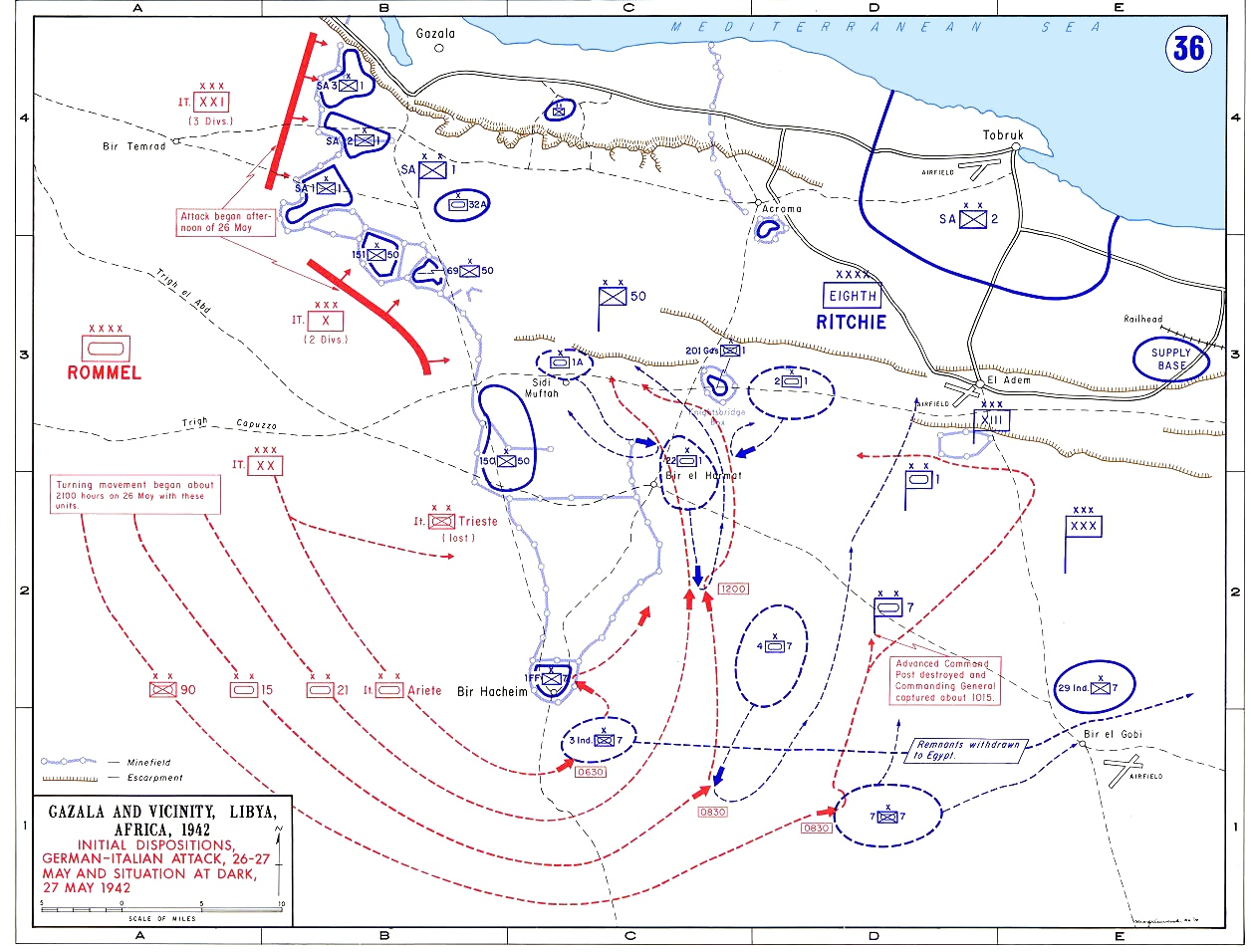
The Battle of Ghazala in May 1942, in vicinity of Tobruk

The "Gazala Line" was a series of occupied "boxes" each of brigade strength set out across the desert with minefields and wire watched by regular patrols between the boxes. The Free French were to the south at the Bir Hakeim box. The line was not equally staffed with a greater number of troops covering the coast leaving the south less protected.

By late May Rommel was ready. Facing him on the Gazala defences were 1st South African Division, nearest the coast, 50th (Northumbrian) Infantry Division (on their left) and 1st Free French Brigade furthest left at Bir Hakeim. The British 1st and 7th Armoured Divisions waited behind the main line as a mobile counter-attacking force while 2nd South African Division formed a garrison at Tobruk and 5th Indian Infantry Division (which had arrived in April to relieve 4th Indian Infantry Division) were held in reserve.

The 69th Brigade position at the start of the battle can be seen in the map (right), it was during this battle that their sister brigade the 150th Infantry Brigade was destroyed in its isolated brigade box by the Afrika Corps and never reformed. The 69th Brigade and the remaining units of 50th Northumbrian Division had to escape by attacking west through the enemy lines then sweeping back east to the south of the enemy forces, eventually they reached the El Alamein line by 1 July.

=== El Alamein ===
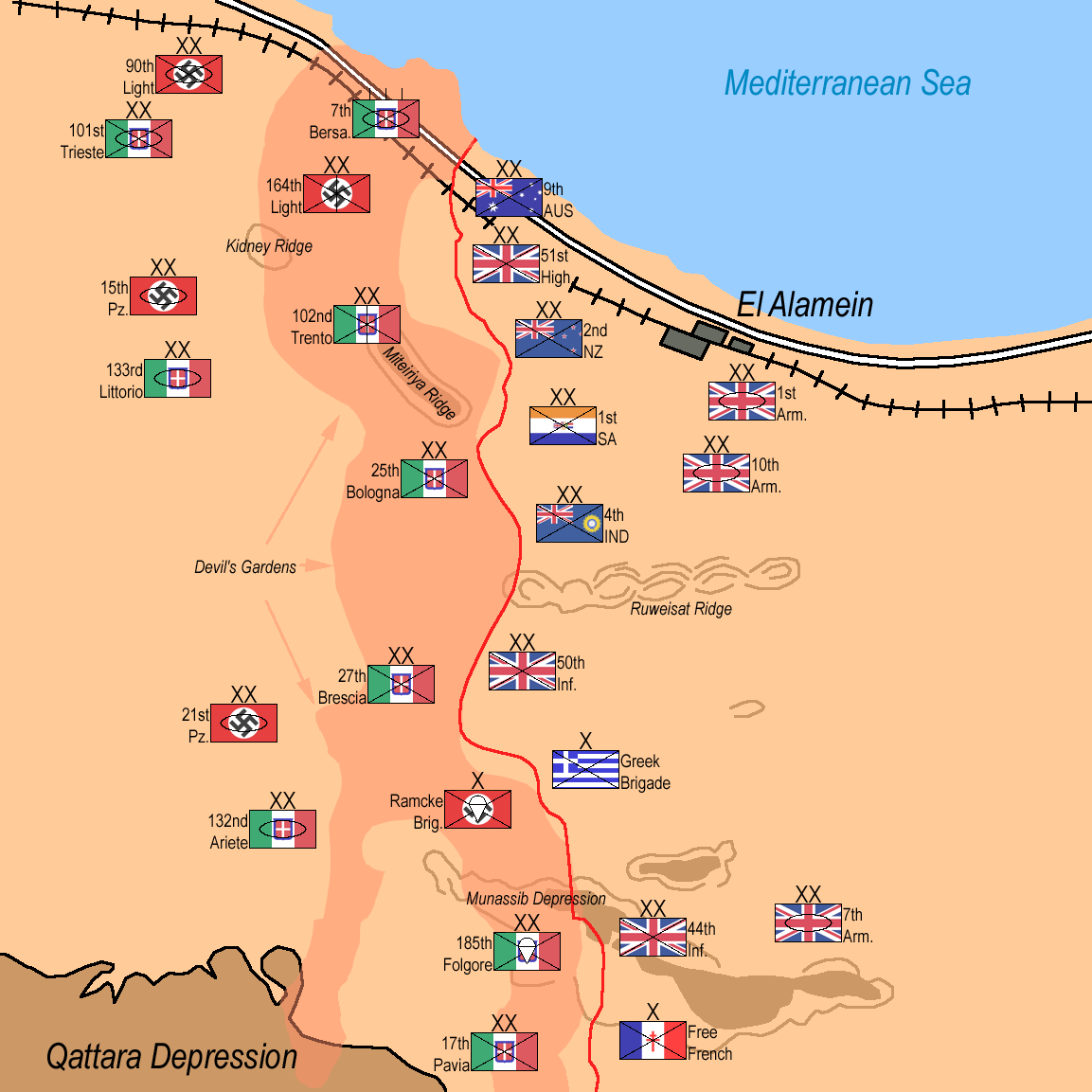
Deployment of forces on the eve of battle

The Battle of El Alamein is usually divided into five phases, consisting of the break-in (23–24 October), the crumbling (24–25 October), the counter (26–28 October), Operation Supercharge (1–2 November) and the breakout (3–7 November). No name is given to the period from 29 to 30 October when the battle was at a standstill.

In the Second Battle of El Alamein, 69th Infantry Brigade and 50th (Northumbrian) Division were initially deployed in the south (see map), where it was to attack the Italian 185th Infantry Division "Folgore", supported by elements of the British 7th Armoured Division. Since the division was understrength, owing to the loss of the 150th infantry Brigade, the 1st Free French Brigade and 1st Greek Brigade were attached to it for the battle. It was then transferred north to take part in Operation Supercharge.

== Tunisia ==
=== Mareth Line ===
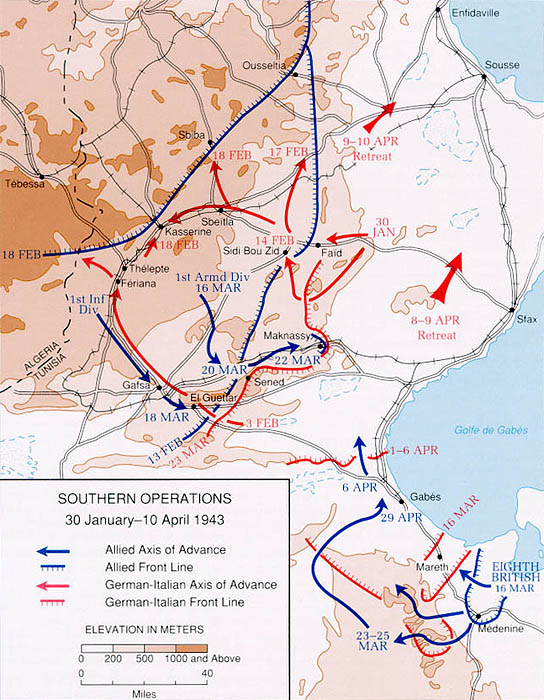
Tunisian campaign

The division fought in Tunisia, where Montgomery launched his major attack, Operation Pugilist, against the Mareth Line in the night of 19 March 1943 – 20 March 1943. The 69th Infantry Brigade part of 50th (Northumbrian) Infantry Division, with difficulty, penetrated the Italian held line near Zarat. The terrain and heavy rain, however, prevented deployment of tanks and anti-tank guns and the 15th Panzer Division's counter-attack on 22 March recaptured much of the bridgehead.

=== Lieutenant Colonel Derek Anthony Seagrim, VC 20/21 March 1943 ===
On 20/21 March 1943 at the Mareth Line, Tunisia, Lieutenant-Colonel Seagrim's courage and leadership led directly to the capture of an important objective. When it appeared that the attack on the position would fail owing to the intensity of the enemy fire, he placed himself at the head of his battalion and led them forward. He personally helped to place a scaling ladder over an anti-tank ditch and was the first across. Leading an attack on two machine-gun posts, he accounted for twenty of the enemy and when a counter-attack was launched next day he moved from post to post quite unperturbed, until it was defeated.

Lieutenant-Colonel Seagrim was killed in action shortly afterwards, on 6 April 1943.

Soon after, XXX Corps prepared a new attack towards Tallouf. The 4th Indian Infantry Division was detailed to make a night attack on 23 March around the left-hand end of the Line. This would coincide with the wide "left hook" manoeuver Montgomery was planning. Operation Supercharge II, "left hook" outflanking maneuver via the Tebaga Gap. Montgomery reinforced the flanking attack, which on 26 March forced an Axis retreat that was completed by 31 March with the Eighth Army in pursuit.

==== Gabes ====
Both the Eighth Army and the U.S. II Corps continued their attacks over the next week, and eventually the Eighth Army broke the lines and the DAK was forced to abandon Gabes and retreat to join the other Axis forces far to the north. On the night of 5 April, Wadi Akarit, was attacked and the "Tobruk" Battalion of the Italian San Marco Marines, was destroyed, although casualties among the 6th Green Howards had been severe; two senior officers, six senior NCO's and junior officers and one hundred and eighteen other ranks killed.

"When we were about ten yards away we had reached the top of the slit trench and we killed any of the survivors," recalled British infantryman Bill Cheall of the 6th Green Howards, who had just seen his section leader shot down by a San Marco Marine. "It was no time for pussy footing, we were intoxicated with rage and had to kill them to pay for our fallen pal."

German General Hans-Jürgen von Arnim later said of the San Marco Marines fighting abilities in Tunisia in 1943, that they were "the best soldiers I ever commanded".

The Eighth Army's attack along the eastern coast of Tunisia, lead eventually to the surrender of Axis forces in Africa. 250,000 men were taken prisoner, a number equal to that at Stalingrad.

== Operation Husky, Sicily Invasion ==
Map of the Allied landings in Sicily on 10 July 1943

After Tunisia the brigade was still part of 50th Northumbrian Infantry Division and was involved in the Sicily landings of July 1943. After Sicily the brigade and the division were recalled from the Eighth Army in Italy to prepare for the invasion of North-West Europe.

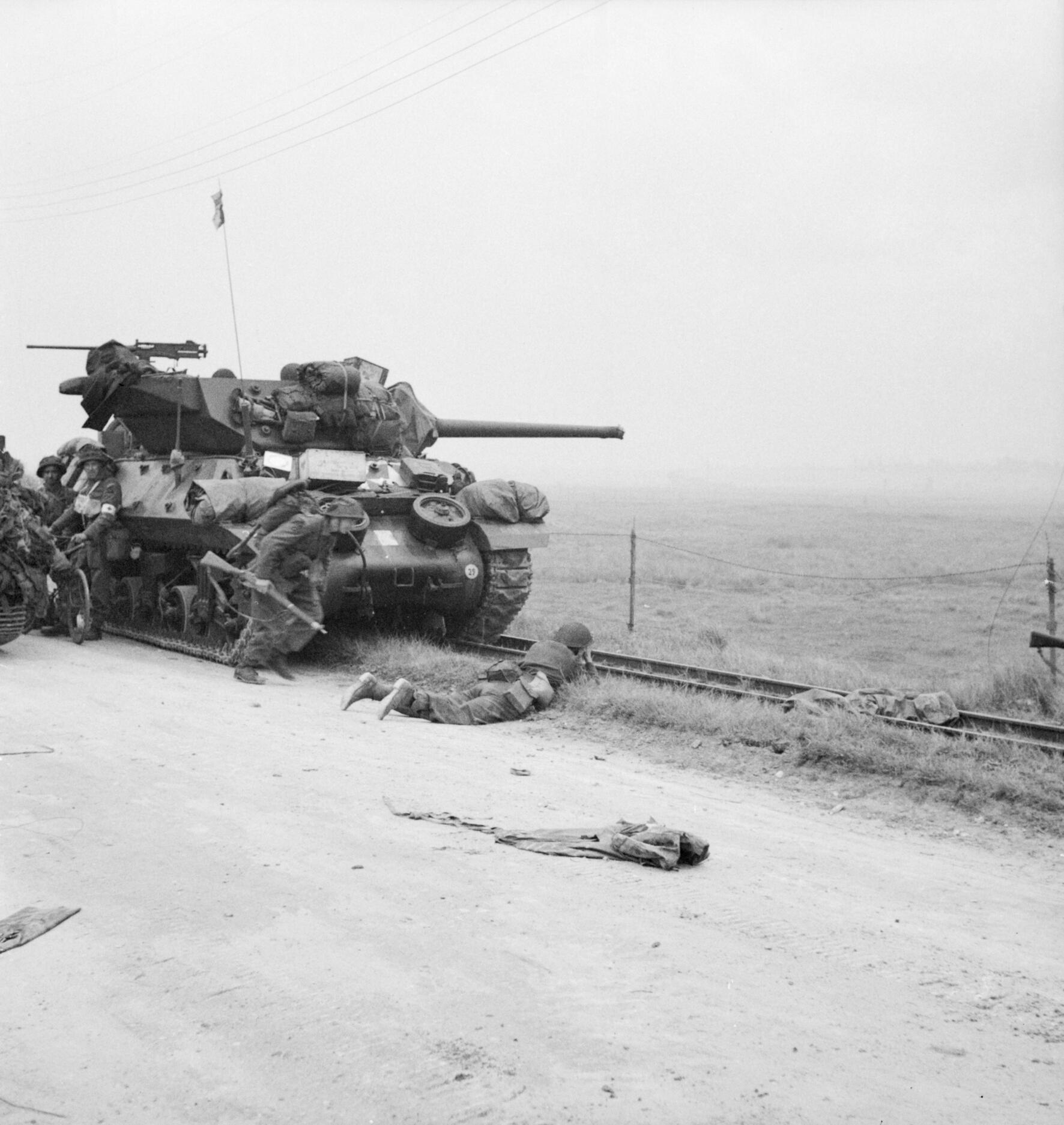
Troops take shelter near an M10 tank destroyer, 6 June 1944

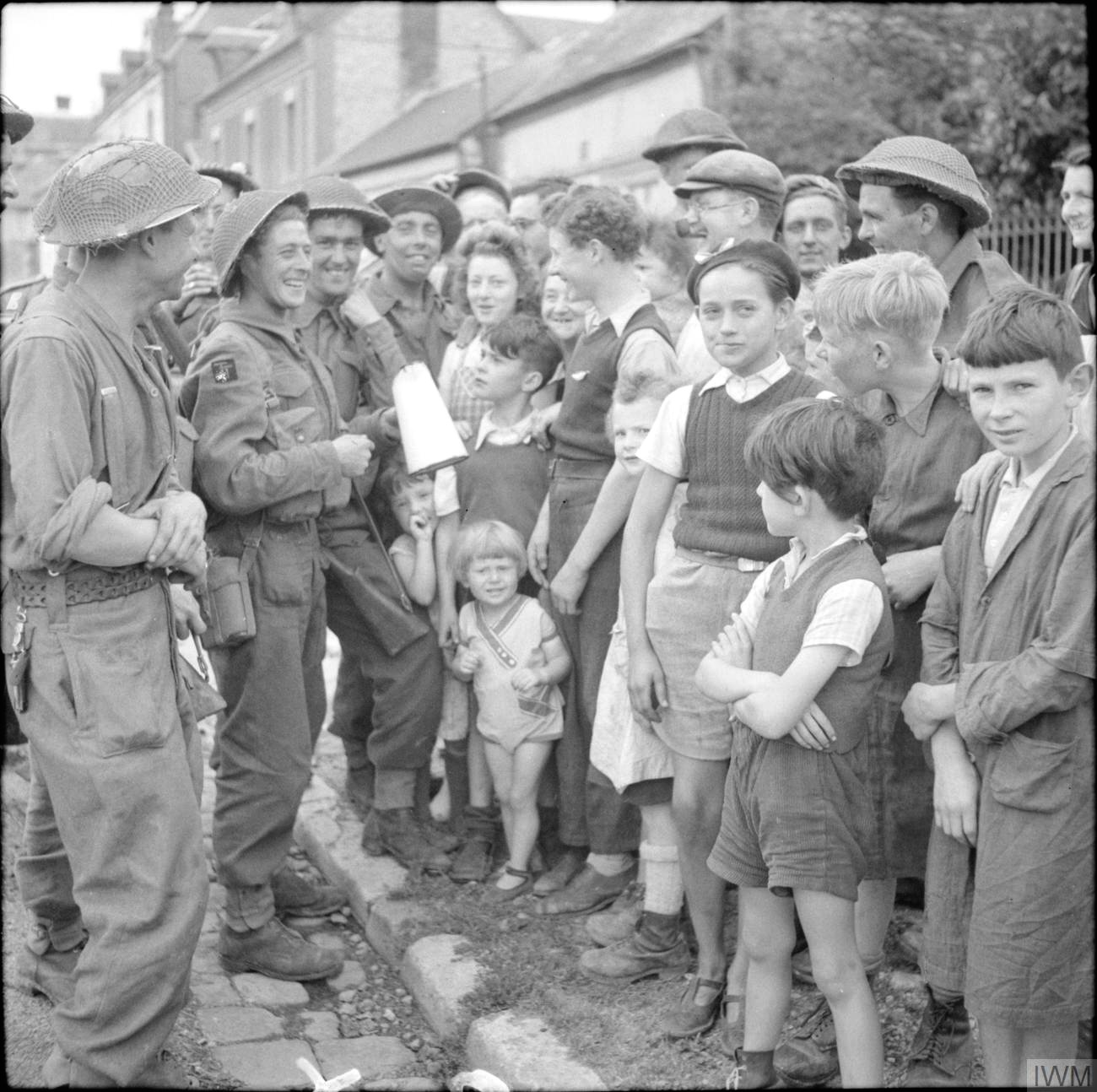
Members of the Green Howards talking to French civilians, 23 August 1944.

== Normandy, Gold Beach ==
Gold was the Allied codename for the centre invasion beach during the Second World War Allied Invasion of Normandy, 6 June 1944. It lay between Omaha and Juno, was 8 km wide and divided into four sectors. From West to East they were How, Item, Jig, and King.

The 69th Brigade assaulted the east side of Gold, with attached armour support from the 4th/7th Royal Dragoon Guards. Company Sergeant-Major Stanley Hollis of the brigade's Green Howard battalion single handededly captured a pill box. Later in the day, he led an assault to destroy German gun positions. For his action he was awarded the Victoria Cross. He was the only soldier to earn that medal on D-Day.

== Operation Market Garden ==
Operation Market Garden (17 September 1944 – 25 September 1944) was an Allied military operation in the Second World War in the Netherlands and Germany. The land portion of the operation was Garden, for which the brigade was assigned to in reserve. On 22 September, the 69th Brigade was split in two, when German forces cut the axis of the advance. The next day, the brigade neared Nijmegen and came under German artillery fire. On 26 September, the brigade attempted an aborted assault on Haalderen, and the fighting ran through 27 September. On 30 September, the brigade along with the entire division, were tasked with defending the area north of Nijmegen and were assaulted by 70 tanks and the equivalent of an infantry division. In defense of the brigade's front, 12,500 25-pound shells were fired and B Company, 2nd Cheshire Regiment fired 95,000 machine-gun rounds.
