= 22nd Indian Infantry Brigade =

- Active: 1940–1942
- Country: (British Raj) British India
- Allegiance: British Empire
- Branch: British Indian Army
- Type: Infantry
- Size: Brigade
- Part of: 9th Indian Infantry Division
- Engagements: Malayan Campaign

The 22nd Indian Infantry Brigade was an Infantry formation of the Indian Army during World War II. It was formed in September 1940, at Baleli in India using assets from the 8th Indian Infantry Brigade and assigned to the 9th Indian Infantry Division. The brigade was sent to Malaya and fought in the Malayan Campaign. After a disastrous campaign the remnants of the brigade surrendered to the Japanese at Johore on 1 February 1942.

== Formation ==
- 1st Battalion, 13th Frontier Force Rifles Octobeor 1940 to May 1941
- 2nd Battalion, 12th Frontier Force Regiment December 1940 to June 1941 and December 1941 to February 1942
- 5th Battalion, 11th Sikh Regiment March to February 1941
- 2nd Battalion, 18th Royal Garhwal Rifles June 1941 to February 1942
- 5th Field Regiment, Royal Artillery December 1941 to January 1942

== See also ==
- List of Indian Army Brigades in World War II
