= Arthur Edward Barstow =

British Indian Army general (1888–1942)

Major-General Arthur Barstow CIE MC
- Born: 17 March 1888; Edinburgh, Scotland
- Died: 28 January 1942 (aged 53); Malaya
- Military career
- Allegiance: United Kingdom
- Branch: British Indian Army
- Service years: 1908–1942
- Rank: Major-General
- Nicknames: "Bustling Bill" "Whiz Bang Sikh"
- Unit: 15th Ludhiana Sikhs
- Commands: 9th Indian Division (1940–42); Waziristan District (1940); Kohat Brigade (1938–40); 2nd Battalion, 11th Sikh Regiment (1933–35)
- Conflicts: First World War (WIA); Iraqi Revolt (1920); Mahmud Barzanji revolts; North-West Frontier; Second World War; Malayan campaign †
- Awards: Companion of the Order of the Indian Empire; Military Cross; Mentioned in dispatches (5)

Major-General Arthur Edward "Bustling Bill" Barstow, CIE, MC (17 March 1888 – 28 January 1942) was a British Indian Army officer who commanded the 9th Indian Division during the Battle of Malaya. He was killed by the Japanese on active service in 1942 while trying to cross a demolished railway bridge near Layang Layang village.

== Early life and family ==
Barstow was the son of Lieutenant Colonel Thomas Adam Anderson Barstow, an officer in the 72nd Seaforth Highlanders, and Jane Cape Barstow. The Barstows were an Army family since the eighteenth century; his father Thomas fought in the Second Afghan War. Arthur was born in Edinburgh and educated at Bradfield College, before attending the Royal Military College, Sandhurst. He was the brother of Brigadier John Anderson Barstow, who was killed in 1941, Lieutenant Edmund Leonard Barstow, killed fighting in Kūt in early 1917 whilst on attachment to the 36th Sikhs and Primrose Cheshire, mother of Group Captain Leonard Cheshire V.C.the famous Second World War Bomber pilot.

He married Nancy Lewkenor Knight, daughter of Brigadier General Henry Lewkenor Knight and Sybil Madeline, on 27 July 1927 in Alton. The generosity of his widow, Nancy had a part to play in the establishment of disability charity Leonard Cheshire.

== Military career ==
On 25 January 1908 he was commissioned into the British Army on the Unattached List, before receiving a commission in the Indian Army on 11 March 1909. Between 1910 and 1919 Barstow served with the 15th Ludhiana Sikhs, including on the Western Front during the First World War. He was awarded the Military Cross, wounded and mentioned in dispatches over the course of the conflict. He subsequently served in the 1920 Iraqi revolt and in India, after attending the Staff College, Camberley from 1924 to 1925, and was Commanding Officer (CO) of the 2nd Battalion, 11th Sikh Regiment between 1933 and 1935.

At the start of the Second World War, Barstow was Commander of Waziristan District, and was invested as a Companion of the Order of the Indian Empire in recognition of his service. In September 1940 he became General Officer Commanding (GOC) of the 9th Indian Division and served with the division during the early months of the Battle of Malaya. He was killed by the Japanese on 28 January 1942 while trying to cross a demolished railway bridge near Layang Layang village. At the time he was attempting to contact one of his brigades, the 22nd Indian Brigade, which had become cut off from the rest of the retreating British forces. The Japanese recovered his body.

The 22nd Indian Brigade was nearly completely destroyed by the Japanese. The 9th Indian Division, after suffering many more casualties, was later absorbed by the 11th Indian Division and the 8th Australian Division, both of which later surrendered at Singapore.

== Publications ==
Barstow's The Sikhs: An Ethnology was published in 1928.

== Bibliography ==
- Colin Smith (2005). Singapore Burning. Penguin. ISBN 978-0-670-91341-1.
- Smart, Nick (2005). Biographical Dictionary of British Generals of the Second World War. Barnsley, U.K.: Pen & Sword Military. ISBN 1-84415-049-6.
