= John Anderson Barstow =

British Army officer (1893–1941)

- Born: 2 May 1893
- Died: 3 January 1941 (aged 47)
- Military career
- Allegiance: United Kingdom
- Branch: British Army
- Service years: 1915–1941
- Rank: Acting Brigadier
- Units: Argyll and Sutherland Highlanders; Black Watch
- Commands: 69th Infantry Brigade
- Conflicts: World War I
- Awards: Military Cross

Brigadier John Anderson Barstow MC (2 May 1893 – 3 January 1941) was a British Army officer, the younger brother of Major-General Arthur Edward Barstow and son of Lieutenant Colonel Thomas Adam Anderson Barstow of the Seaforth Highlanders and Jane Cape Barstow.

John Barstow was born 2 May 1893 and died 3 January 1941. He joined the British Army and was commissioned as a second lieutenant into the Argyll and Sutherland Highlanders, transferred to the Black Watch (Royal Highlanders) in May 1916, during World War I. He was awarded the Military Pass on 3 June 1916. On 10 June 1919 he married Nancy Sinclair Wemyss and they had a son and daughter: Michael Thomas Barstow and Lois Edith Barstow.

During the interwar period he served as a staff officer in India and on the Imperial General Staff as well as serving with the 1st Battalion, Black Watch. He attended the Staff College, Camberley from 1925 to 1926.

During World War II he commanded the 69th Infantry Brigade. He died soon after leaving command of the 69th Brigade at the age of forty seven and is buried at Edrom Parish Church.
