= MS Awazisan Maru =

Coordinates: 06°08′N 102°16′E

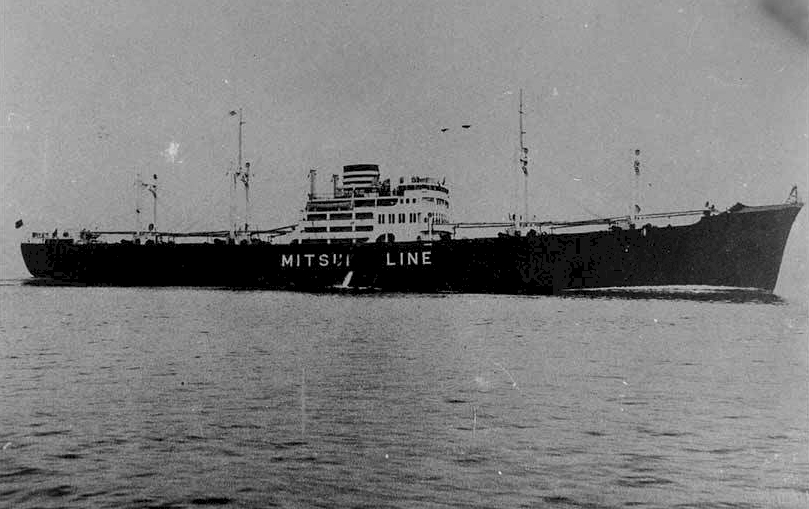

History

Empire of Japan
- Name: Awazisan Maru
- Owner: Mitsui & Co. Ltd. (1939–1941)
- Builder: Tama Zosensho
- Yard number: 245
- Laid down: 29 March 1938
- Launched: 22 December 1938
- Completed: 15 July 1939
- Maiden voyage: 31 August 1939
- Homeport: Kobe
- Identification: Call sign JXOM
- Fate: Requisitioned by Imperial Japanese Army

Empire of Japan
- Name: Awazisan Maru
- Operator: Imperial Japanese Army
- Acquired: 10 September 1941
- Identification: 882
- Fate: Sunk, 12 December 1941

General characteristics
- Type: Passenger cargo ship
- Tonnage: 9,794 GRT; 5,817 NRT; 10,930 DWT
- Length: 482.9 ft (147.2 m)
- Beam: 64.0 ft (19.5 m)
- Depth: 40.7 ft (12.4 m)
- Installed power: 1,646 nhp, 9,600 bhp
- Propulsion: Tama Zosensho 8-cylinder 2-stroke cycle double-acting diesel engine
- Speed: 18 1/2 knots (21.3 mph; 34.3 km/h)

Awazisan Maru (淡路山丸), also known as Awajisan Maru or Awagisan Maru, was a motor cargo vessel built by Tama Zosensho of Tamano for Mitsui & Co. Ltd. with intention of serving on their Yokohama to New York route. The ship remained in service between Japan and United States for two years before being requisitioned by the Imperial Japanese Army. She was bombed and damaged during her first Army mission and subsequently torpedoed and sunk by a Dutch submarine in December 1941.

== Design and construction ==
The ship was launched in 1939 and was notable for being the most advanced freighter of its time. It was commissioned by the Imperial Japanese Army to transport troops in World War II and was part of the Japanese Invasion of Malaya on 8 December 1941.

== Operational history ==
=== Imperial Japanese Army ===
Along with its sister ship Ayatosan Maru and Sakura Maru, she was carrying around 5,000 troops during the landings at Kota Bharu. Awazisan Maru was bombed by a Lockheed Hudson aircraft piloted by Flt. Lt. Oscar Diamond of No. 1 Squadron RAAF, set afire and was abandoned to drift. It is believed that the freighter sunk or was subsequently torpedoed by the Dutch submarine K XII.

The invasion of Malaya preceded the attack on Pearl Harbor by an hour and a half, making it the first Japanese campaign of World War II, likely making Awazisan Maru the very first casualty in the war.

Awazisan Maru now lies in 20 m (66 ft) of water off the coast of Pantai Sabak in Kota Bharu and is fast becoming a popular diving destination due to its remarkable history. It is more popularly known amongst local divers as the Japanese Invasion Wreck.
