= 12th Frontier Force Regiment =

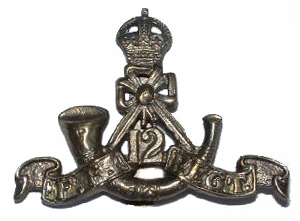
- Active: 1922–1956
- Country: British India; Pakistan
- Branch: British Indian Army; Pakistan Army
- Type: Infantry
- Regimental Centre: Mardan 1923; Sialkot 1946
- Uniform: Drab; faced scarlet
- Engagements: North West Frontier of India; Second Sikh War; Second Burmese War; Indian Mutiny; Sikkim; Second Afghan War; Boxer Rebellion; Dervish War; First World War; Third Afghan War; Second World War

Commanders
- Notable commanders: Field Marshal Sam Manekshaw; Lt General Sir Harry Lumsden; Field Marshal Sir Charles Egerton; General Sir William Lockhart; General Sir Rob Lockhart

The 12th Frontier Force Regiment was formed in 1922 as part of the British Indian Army. It consisted of five regular battalions; numbered 1 to 5 and the 10th (Training) Battalion. During the Second World War a further ten battalions were raised. In 1945, the prenominal "12th" was dropped when the British Indian Army dispensed with prenominal numbering of its regiments. After the independence in 1947, it was formed into the Frontier Force Regiment, part of the army of Pakistan.

== History ==
=== Early history ===
The 12th Frontier Force Regiment's origins lie in the four infantry regiments of the Frontier Brigade authorised in 1846 and raised by Lieutenant-Colonel Henry Lawrence, the agent (and brother) of the Governor-General of the Punjab frontier region (John Lawrence, 1st Baron Lawrence), from veterans of disbanded opposition forces after the First Anglo-Sikh War. The 1st Sikhs were raised by Captain J. S. Hodgson at Hoshiarpur, the 2nd Sikhs by Captain J.W.V. Stephen at Kangra, the 3rd Sikhs by Captain F. Winter at Ferozpur and the 4th Sikhs by Captain C. MacKenzie at Ludhiana. Even at the start the Sikhs, although in the majority, were not in the preponderance, the unit names referring to their origins in the disbanded Sikh Army rather than their racial mix. The nuclei of the regiments consisted of a few men from the regular Native Infantry regiments of the line and police officers. The Governor-General issued a regulation in September 1847 which included the discontinuation of the term "Frontier Brigade" and renamed the four regiments the 1st, 2nd, 3rd and 4th Regiments of Sikh Local Infantry.

At the same time, Lawrence also ordered irregular force of mixed cavalry and infantry: the Corps of Guides to be raised at Mardan by Lieutenant Harry D. Lumsden. In 1851 the four Sikh regiments and the Corps of Guides became part of the Punjab Irregular Force. Men of these regiments (or their successors) are to this day known as Piffers. The four Sikh regiments also went through a number of minor name changes over the next 45 or so years: in 1857 they became "Regiment of Sikh Infantry, Punjab Irregular Force" and in 1865 "Regiment of Sikh Infantry, Punjab Frontier Force" (reflecting the change in name of the PIF to Punjab Frontier Force). In 1901, they became "Sikh Infantry". In 1876, the Corps of Guides became one of the first regiments in the Indian Army to be conferred royal status as Queen Victoria's Own Corps of Guides.

In 1903, the reorganisation of the British Indian Army caused the four Sikh regiments to be re-designated as follows: 51st, 52nd, 53rd and 54th Sikhs (Frontier Force) while the Corps of Guides infantry became Queen Victoria's Own Corps of Guides (Frontier Force) Infantry, and was renamed again in 1911 as Queen Victoria's Own Corps of Guides (Frontier Force) Lumsden's Infantry.

=== Formation of 12th Frontier Force Regiment ===
In the 1922 reorganisation of the British Indian Army, the four Sikh regiments became the first four battalions of the newly constituted 12th Frontier Force Regiment. The two infantry battalions of the Corps of Guides became its 5th and 10th (training) battalions. At the same time the first battalion became the 1st battalion (Prince of Wales' Own Sikhs) whilst the 3rd battalion was made the 3rd Royal Battalion (Sikhs) in 1935. The Corps of Guides, being the senior unit, were entitled to have become the 1st battalion but agreed to allow the four Sikh battalions to retain their historical 1 to 4 numbering although in a later incarnation the precedence was restored in the 1957 reorganisation of the Pakistan Army when the Guides battalion became the 2nd battalion of the new regiment, following the Scinde Rifles battalion from the Frontier Force Rifles regiment. The location of the training battalion, later to grow into the Regimental Centre, was first at Mardan but moved to Sialkot in 1929. The new structure of the regiment by 1939 was therefore as follows:

- Regimental Centre, in Mardan
- 1st Battalion – former 51st Sikhs (Frontier Force)
- 2nd Battalion – former 52nd Sikhs (Frontier Force)
- 3rd Battalion – former 53rd Sikhs (Frontier Force)
- 4th Battalion – former 54th Sikhs (Frontier Force)
- 5th Battalion – former 1st Battalion, Queen Victoria's Own Corps of Guides Infantry
- 10th (Training) Battalion – former 2nd Battalion, Queen Victoria's Own Corps of Guides Infantry
- 11th (Territorial) Battalion – formed in 1921, disbanded in 1941, part of the Indian Territorial Force

=== Second World War ===
During the Second World War the regiment's battalions (expanded in number by seven war-formed units) saw service in East Africa, North Africa and the Middle East, Italy, India, Malaya and Burma. The Regiment's casualties in the war totalled 1,444 dead and 3,503 wounded.

=== Regular battalions ===
- 1/12th (Prince of Wales's Own Sikhs) Frontier Force Regiment

In 1939, the 1/12th Frontier Force Rifles were part of the Bannu Brigade based in Bannu India and took part in operations in the Ahmedzai Salient in February and March 1940 while under command of the Jhelum Brigade. In the autumn of 1940 the battalion transferred to the Delhi Cantonment and on 15 May 1941, the battalion was transferred to the 17th Indian Infantry Brigade, part of the 8th Indian Infantry Division which was being raised in Bombay, and with which it remained for the rest of the war. The 1/12th served in Iraq and Syria before it was sent to fight in the Italian Campaign on 24 September 1943.

- 2/12th (2nd Sikhs) Frontier Force Regiment

The 2/12th FFR, also part of the Bannu Brigade, before being sent to Malaya in April 1941 where it became part of the 22nd Indian Infantry Brigade. This battalion fought a successful, but doomed, defence of the eastern coast of Malaya, during the Battle of Malaya, before it was forced to surrender with the rest of the Allied forces in Singapore on 15 February 1942. The commanding officer of the 2/12th FFR, Lt.Col.Arthur Edward Cumming, received the Victoria Cross during this campaign.

- 3/12th (Royal) Frontier Force Regiment

The 3/12th FFR was part of the 5th Indian Infantry Division during the East African and Western Desert Campaigns. The 3/12th FFR was all but destroyed at El Adem on 15 June 1942. It was reformed in Egypt before transferring to the 4th Indian Infantry Division.

- 4/12th (Sikhs) Frontier Force Regiment

The 4/12th FFR served throughout the war in the Burma Campaign.

- 5/12th (Queen Victoria's Own Corps of Guides) Frontier Force Regiment

The 5/12th FFR served throughout the Second World War as part of the 6th Indian Infantry Division on garrison duties in Iraq.

== Later history ==
In 1945, the regiment was renamed the Frontier Force Regiment, dropping the numerical designation "12", and on the independence in 1947, it was allocated to Pakistan. In 1957, the Frontier Force Rifles and The Pathan Regiment (which had been formed after independence from the 14th battalion Frontier Force Regiment and the 14th and 15th battalions Frontier Force Rifles) were amalgamated with it to form a new Frontier Force Regiment.

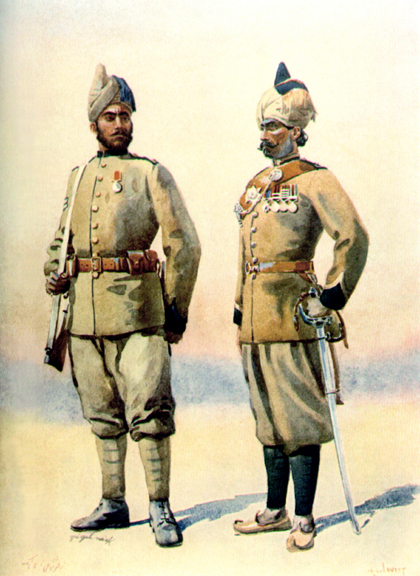
Naik, 57th Wilde's Rifles and Subedar, 53rd Sikhs (right). Watercolour by Major AC Lovett, 1910.

== Battle honours ==
- Mooltan, Goojerat, Punjaub, Pegu, Delhi 1857,
- Ali Masjid, Kabul 1879,
- Ahmed Khel, Kandahar 1880,
- Afghanistan 1878–80,
- Chitral, Malakand, Punjab Frontier, Tirah, Pekin 1900,
- Somaliland 1901–04,
- Suez Canal, Egypt 1915,
- Megiddo, Sharon, Nablus, Palestine 1918,
- Aden, Tigris 1916,
- Kut-al-Amara 1917,
- Baghdad, Sharqat, Mesopotamia 1915–18,
- NW Frontier, India 1914, 1915, 1916–17,
- Afghanistan 1919,
- Gallabat, Tehamiyam Wells, Agordat, Barentu, Keren, Amba Alagi, Abyssinia 1940–41,
- Gazala, Bir Hacheim, El Adem, North Africa 1940–43,
- Landing in Sicily, Sicily 1943,
- Landing at Reggio, The Sangro, Mozzagrogna, Romagnoli, The Moro, Impossible Bridge, Cassino II, Pignataro, Advance to Florence, Campriano, Gothic Line, Coriano, Montebello-Scorticata, The Senio, Santerno Crossing, Italy 1943–45,
- Athens, Greece 1944–45,
- North Malaya, Kota Bharu, Central Malaya, Kuantan, Machang, Singapore Island, Malaya 1941–42,
- Moulmein, Sittang 1942, 1945,
- Pegu 1942, 1945,
- Taukkyan, Shwegyin, North Arakan, Buthidaung, Maungdaw, Ngakyedauk Pass, Imphal, Tamu Road, Shenam Pass, Bishenpur, Kyaukmyaung Bridgehead, Arakan Beaches, Ramree, Taungup, Mandalay, Myinmu, Fort Dufferin, Kyaukse 1945,
- Meiktila, Nyaungu Bridgehead, Capture of Meiktila, Defence of Meiktila, The Irrawaddy, Rangoon Road, Pyawbwe, Toungoo, Burma 1942–45

== See also ==
- Frontier Force Regiment
- 13th Frontier Force Rifles
- List of Regiments of the British Indian Army (1903)
- List of Regiments of the British Indian Army (1922)
