= Arthur Edward Cumming =

- Born: 18 June 1896; Karachi, British India
- Died: 10 April 1971 (aged 74); Edinburgh, Scotland
- Military career
- Allegiance: United Kingdom
- Branch: British Indian Army
- Rank: Brigadier
- Commands: 2/12th Frontier Force Regiment; 63rd Indian Brigade; Dehra Dun District
- Conflicts: World War I World War II
- Awards: Victoria Cross; Order of the British Empire; Military Cross

Brigadier Arthur Edward Cumming VC OBE MC (18 June 1896 – 10 April 1971) was a Scottish recipient of the Victoria Cross, the highest and most prestigious award for gallantry in the face of the enemy that can be awarded to British and Commonwealth forces.

He was born in Karachi, British India of Scottish parentage and attended Karachi Grammar School.

Cumming was 45 years old, and a lieutenant colonel commanding the 2/12th Frontier Force Regiment, in the Indian Army during World War II. Lt. Col Cumming and his battalion were defending an airfield during the Battle of Malaya when the following deed took place for which he was awarded the VC (currently displayed at the National Army Museum).

On 3 January 1942 near Kuantan, Malaya, the Japanese made a furious attack on the battalion and a strong enemy force penetrated the position. Lieutenant Colonel Cumming, with a small party of men, immediately led a counter-attack and although all his men became casualties and he, himself, had two bayonet wounds in the stomach he managed to restore the situation sufficiently for the major portion of the battalion and its vehicles to be withdrawn. Later he drove in a carrier, under very heavy fire, collecting isolated detachments of his men and was again wounded. His gallant actions helped the brigade to withdraw safely.

Cumming was one of a small number of officers and men who were ordered to be evacuated from Singapore before the island was surrendered on 15 February 1942. Cumming commanded a battalion of the 9th Jat Regiment before his promotion to brigadier and command of the 63rd Indian Brigade during the Burma campaign. From 1944 to his retirement in 1947 Brigadier Cumming was in command of the Dehra Dun District in India.

His VC is on display at the National Army Museum, Chelsea.

== See also ==
- Japanese Invasion of Malaya

== Sources ==
- John, Laffin (1997). British VCs of World War 2: A Study in Heroism. Sutton Publishing. ISBN 0-7509-1026-7.
- Monuments to Courage (David Harvey, 1999)
- The Register of the Victoria Cross (This England, 1997)
- Best, Brian (2017). The Forgotten VCs: The Victoria Crosses of the War in the Far East During WW2. Frontline Books. ISBN 978-1526717979.
