= 53 Medium Regiment (India) =

- Active: 1964 – present
- Country: India
- Allegiance: India
- Branch: Indian Army
- Type: Artillery
- Size: Regiment
- Motto(s): Sarvatra, Izzat-O-Iqbal (Everywhere with Honour and Glory)
- Colors: Red & Navy Blue
- Anniversaries: 1 March – Raising Day

Insignia
- Abbreviation: 53 Med Regt

53 Medium Regiment is part of the Regiment of Artillery of the Indian Army.

== Formation ==
The regiment was raised as 53 Mountain Composite Regiment (Pack) on 1 March 1964 at Bareilly. The first commanding officer was Lieutenant Colonel Gurbachan Singh. It consists of 531, 532 and 533 batteries. At raising, one battery was equipped with 120 mm Brandt mortars and two batteries with 3.7 inch howitzers.

== Class composition ==
The regiment is a single class regiment with Sikh soldiers.

== History ==
After spending a year in Bareilly, the regiment moved to Se La-Bomdila in August 1965 to take part in Operation Ablaze. The unit moved to Lekhapani in November 1966, where it was converted to a motorised regiment. The regiment was sent to Tirap in May 1967 to deal with the Naga insurgency. After a successful tenure, the regiment moved to Bakloh in December 1968. It then relocated to Dahung-Se La in Arunachal Pradesh in 1970. During the 1971 war, it was tasked to guard the heights of Se La-Tawang. Following the war, the unit moved to Bharatpur and then to Udhampur. The regiment was actively involved in relief and rescue operations during the Bharatpur floods of 1975.

In 1981, the regiment was equipped with the 75/24 Pack Howitzers and thus became a mountain regiment. It was posted to Tangdhar in Jammu and Kashmir close to the Line of Control (LoC). The unit moved to Dehradun in 1984. In 1989, the regiment was equipped with field guns and as a field regiment moved to Sikkim. Following an arduous tenure in Tangla, Lachung and Dahung, the unit was converted to a medium regiment in 1992. It was relocated to Bathinda and helped ensured the smooth conduct of Panchayat elections in 1993. In 1997, the regiment moved to Alwar and then to Baramulla, where it was converted to heavy mortar regiment. The unit moved from Baramulla to Amritsar after being converted to a medium regiment. In 2007, the unit shifted to the high altitude location of Gurez valley near the line of control for counter-terrorist operations. The regiment them moved to Samba, where its duties also involved securing National Highway 44.

== Equipment ==
The regiment had used the following equipment since its formation–

- 120 mm Brandt mortars
- 3.7 inch howitzers
- 75/24 Pack Howitzer
- 25-pounders
- 76 mm Yugoslav mountain gun
- 122 mm D-30 howitzer
- 105 mm Indian field gun
- 105 mm Light field gun
- 160 mm Tampella mortar
- 130 mm M-46 Field Gun

== Gallantry awards ==
The regiment has won the following gallantry awards–

- Major Kumandur Prabhakar Vinay – was posthumously awarded the Kirti Chakra, when he was on deputation with 34 Rashtriya Rifles.

== Achievements ==
- The regiment had the honour to participate with its guns in the Republic Day Parade in 1986.
- Havildar Jaswinder Singh represented the Indian Army team in Hammer throw in the Inter Services Athletic Meet, 2021.

== Notable Officers ==
- Lieutenant General KK Nanda – commanded the regiment and went on to become Chief of Staff, Central Command and Colonel Commandant, Remount Veterinary Corps.
- Brigadier Anil Kumar – commanded the regiment and retired as BGS (Combat Power), Army Training Command

== See also ==
- List of artillery regiments of Indian Army
