= 22 Medium Regiment (India) =

Indian Army artillery unit

22 Medium Regiment (Sittang and Yenang Yaung)
- Active: 1920 – present
- Country: India
- Allegiance: British India; India
- Branch: British Indian Army; Indian Army
- Type: Artillery
- Size: Regiment
- Nicknames: Victoria Cross Regiment; Corps-De-Elite
- Mottos: Sarvatra, Izzat-O-Iqbal (Everywhere with Honour and Glory).
- Colors: Red & Navy Blue
- Anniversaries: 23 February (Sittang Honour Title Day); 29 June (Raising Day); 15 December (VC Day)
- Equipment: 105 mm Light Field Gun (LFG)
- Battle honours: Sittang; Yenang Yaung

Insignia
- Abbreviation: 22 Med Regt

22 Medium Regiment (Sittang and Yenang Yaung) is part of the Regiment of Artillery of the Indian Army. It was raised in 1920 as 8 Pack Artillery Brigade.

== Formation and early history ==
Mountain Artillery in India was developed in the 1800s by the British to allow field guns to accompany forces operating in the frontier mountainous regions of North West India bordering Afghanistan. The mountain artillery units were organised as mountain batteries, each consisting of four to six guns. These batteries proved their mettle in the many campaigns in Afghanistan and during the Third Anglo-Burmese War. More batteries were raised during the First World War and these batteries saw action at various fronts.

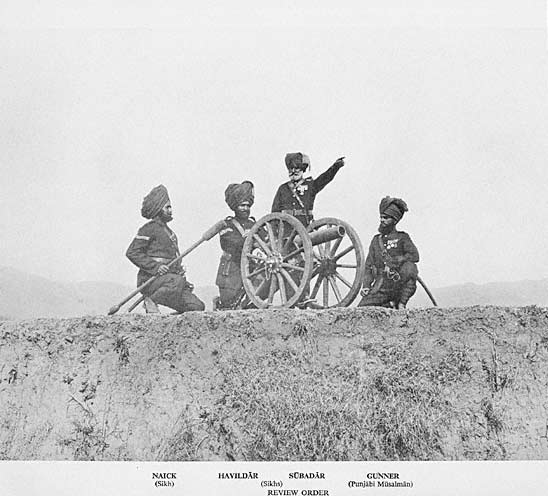
Photograph, circa 1895 showing a 7-pounder mountain gun of No. 4 (Hazara) Mountain Battery listing the crew's ranks

During the war, the practice of grouping together batteries as brigades began, though most batteries still fought singly, often quite far away from other parts of the brigade. In 1920, the nomenclature mountain was changed to pack and these units were named as pack brigades. Each pack brigade consisted of headquarters, one British pack battery armed with four 3.7 inch howitzers and three Indian pack batteries consisting of four 2.75 inch guns. In 1920, six new pack artillery brigades were formed. 8 Pack Artillery Brigade was one among them and was raised at Peshawar.

At the time of its raising, 8 Pack Artillery Brigade was commanded by Lieutenant Colonel Alan Gordon Haig CMG, DSO. The ethnic composition of the Indian gunners of 8 Pack Artillery Brigade was half Punjabi Muslims and half Sikhs. The brigade consisted of one British battery and three Indian batteries, namely -

- 8th Pack Battery, R.G.A., commanded by Major M.E. Mascall DSO, OBE at Landi Kotal
- 22nd Derajat Pack Battery (Frontier Force), commanded by Major S. Carwithen DSO at Nowshera
- 24th Hazara Pack Battery (Frontier Force), commanded by Major E.W. Chadwick MC at Ali Masjid
- 30th Pack Battery, commanded by Major W.M. Hunt DSO, MC at Peshawar

A re-designation of units took place following Indian Army Order 1279 of 1921 – Pack Artillery Brigades were redesignated at Indian Pack Artillery Brigades and the 6th to 11th brigades were renumbered from 20th to 25th. Thus, 8 Pack Artillery Brigade became 22nd Pack Artillery Brigade. At the same time, 80 was added to each battery number and the ‘Frontier Force’ distinction omitted. This omission was restored in 1922 by Indian Army Order 515.

== 1922-1939 ==
Batteries were moved from one brigade to another as needed. For example, in 1922, when the unit was at Nowshera, the constituent batteries were -

- 102nd (Derajat) Pack Battery (formerly 22nd Derajat Pack Battery (Frontier Force))
- 104th (Hazara) Pack Battery (formerly 24th Hazara Pack Battery (Frontier Force))
- 110th (Abbottabad) Pack Battery (formerly 30th Mountain Battery)

In 1927, 100 was deducted from numbers and all batteries were retitled as ‘Indian Mountain Batteries, RA’. 22nd Mountain Brigade was at Kohat in July 1929 and at Peshawar in October 1933. During this time, the unit consisted of -

- 4th (Hazara) Indian Mountain Battery, R.A. (F.F.)
- 10th Abbottabad Mountain Battery, R.A.
- 2nd (Derajat) Indian Mountain Battery, R.A. (F.F.)
- 3rd Light Battery, R.A.

These mountain batteries continued to be in operation in the North Western part of India and Afghanistan between 1920 and 1935. 22nd Mountain Brigade was part of the Mohmand campaign of 1935 and was involved in the advance to Ghalanai in August 1935 and to Nahakki in September 1935. In late 1935, 22nd Mountain Brigade was located at Wana, Waziristan and the class composition was of Punjabi Muslims and Jat Sikhs. It consisted of –

- Headquarters and 7th (Bengal) Mountain Battery, R.A.
- 2nd (Derajat) Mountain Battery, R.A. (F.F.)
- 4th (Hazara) Mountain Battery, R.A. (F.F.)
- 4th Light Battery, R.A.

Between 1935 and 1939, there was relative peace in the North West Frontier, though the unit was involved in many operations in Waziristan. It was part of the Razmak column, also known as Razcol and consisted of –

- 3rd Light Battery, R.A.
- 4th (Hazara) Mountain Battery, R.A. (F.F.)
- 7th (Bengal) Mountain Battery, R.A.

By Indian Army Order 204 of 1938, the nomenclature ‘Brigade’ was replaced by ‘Regiment’ and thus the title of the unit became 22nd Mountain Regiment. From 1 August 1939, Indian Mountain Artillery ceased to belong to the Royal Regiment of Artillery and formed part of His Majesty’s Indian Forces. The Corps of Mountain Artillery was transferred to the Indian Regiment of Artillery, later renamed the Regiment of Indian Artillery (R.I.A.).

== World War II ==
British Malaya in 1941, at the eve of Japanese invasion.

The first Indian Artillery unit to see action in the war against the Japanese was 22 Mountain Regiment, which had sailed from India for Malaya in August 1939. In September 1939, before the outbreak of World War II, 22nd Mountain Regiment was under command of Lieutenant Colonel A.H. Peskett, MC and was under 12 Indian Infantry Brigade Group and of Malaya Command. It had three Indian and one British mountain batteries –

- 4th Hazara Mountain Battery F.F. (Major G.L. Hughes MC)
- 7th Bengal Mountain Battery (Major S.F. Fisken MC)
- 10th Abbottabad Mountain Battery (Captain D.G.C. Cowie)
- 21st Mountain Battery (Major F.H.C. Rogers MC)

During the war, 22 Mountain Regiment fought all down the Peninsula in small detachments. The batteries were also employed in a secondary anti-tank role.

The 4th, 7th and 10th batteries were affiliated to the 2 Argyll and Sutherland Highlanders, 5/2 Punjab and 4/19 Hyderabad Regiments respectively for jungle training in Johore. The 4th Hazara Battery was re-armed with 6 inch howitzers towed by Marmon-Herrington trucks. The 3.7 inch howitzers were divided between the 10th and 21st batteries. In December 1940, Regimental Headquarters (R.H.Q.) along with 7th and 10th batteries moved to Ipoh to join the newly arrived 11 Indian Division. The other two batteries remained at the Naval Base under 12 Indian Infantry Brigade.

In January 1941, R.H.Q. along with 7th and 10th batteries moved to Jitra in Kedah under 6 Indian Infantry Brigade under 11 Indian Division. 7th battery was affiliated to 2/16 Punjab Regiment and 10th battery with 1/8 Punjab Regiment. In May 1941, 21st battery joined 9 Division at Kota Bahru. In July 1941, the battery was re-armed with 3.7-inch howitzers on trailers and joined 11 Division in Kedah. It was affiliated to 3/16 Punjab Regiment at Kroh. In September 1941, all batteries were concentrated at Jitra.

In late 1941, the unit was being commanded by Lieutenant Colonel G.L. Hughes MC, 4th (Hazara) Battery by Major E.L. Sawyer, 7th (Bengal) Battery by Major J.W.P. Scott, 10th (Abbottabad) Battery by Major D.G.C. Cowie and 21st Battery (Royal Artillery) by Major J.B. Sopper.

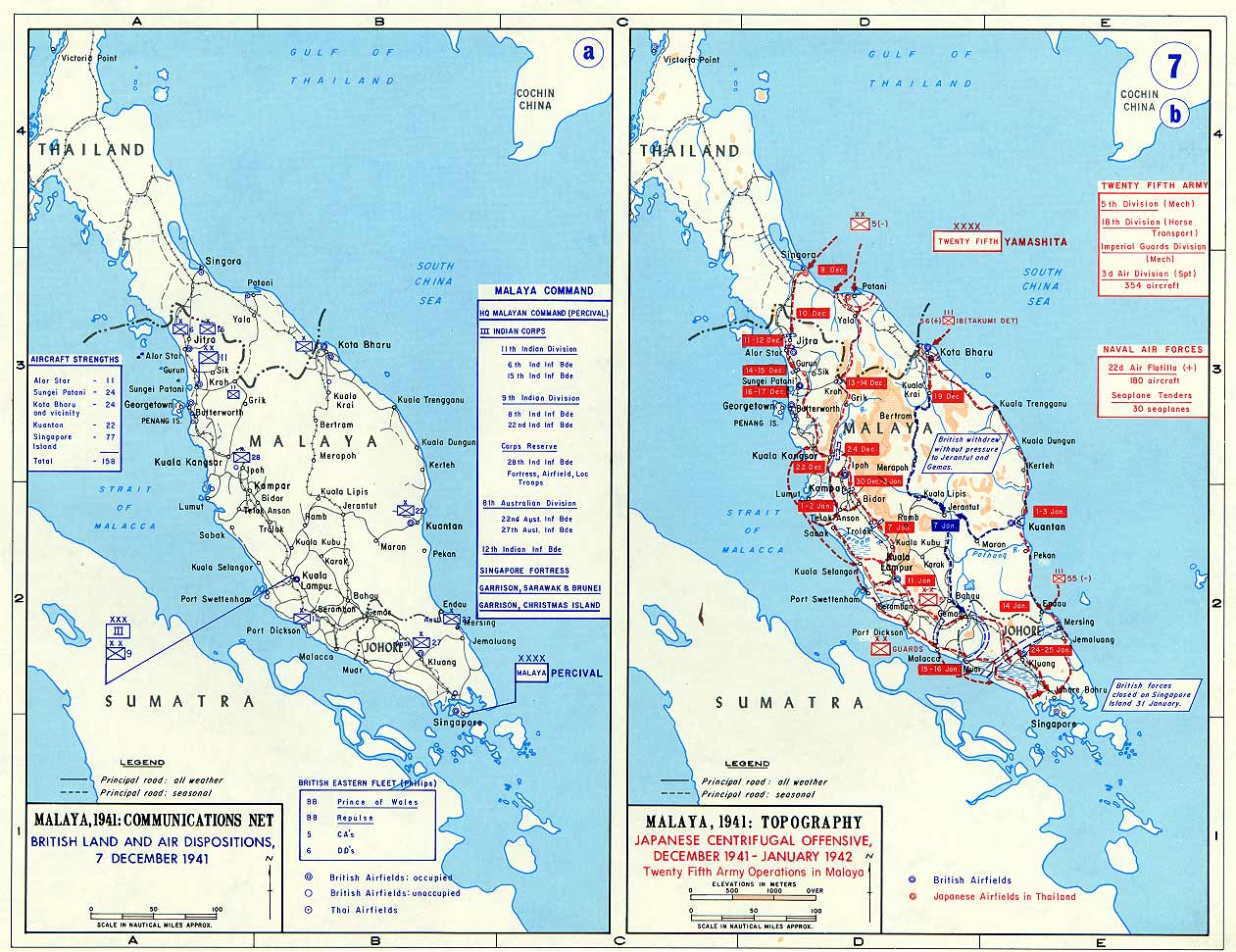
Malaya with British forces as on 7 December 1941 (left) and Japanese offensive between December 1941 and January 1942 (right)

21st Mountain Battery shelled the Japanese ships within range on the day of the invasion, 8 December 1941. On 9th, the battery held a defensive line at Krai and beat off an attack on 12th; though they had to withdraw further. For the next two days, the battery was in support of 2/10 Baluch Regiment. The battery moved to Kuala Lipis and then to Kuantan under the 22 Infantry Brigade. The battery took part in sea firing against the enemy and airfield defence tasks. It moved to Gambang on the night of 22 December 1941 and joined 2/12 Frontier Force Regiment, where it faced a heavy enemy attack. The battery fought both in artillery and infantry role till 3 January 1942, when it became imperative to withdraw. It moved via Raub to Kuala Lumpur, finally joining the unit, which was with the 11 Indian Division.

Meanwhile, the other batteries of the 22 Mountain Regiment were expecting to take part in an offensive role of the division. 4th Battery was on the border astride Alor Star-Singora road with 1/14 Punjab Regiment under 15 Indian Infantry Brigade. 7th and 10th batteries were located for the defence of Jitra under 6 Indian Infantry Brigade. 10th battery began preparing a defence at Kroh, when it along with 5/4 Punjabis had to extricate 3/16 Punjab from Betong. In the fierce fighting on 13 January, two companies of Japanese were practically exterminated. The battery saw heavy fighting on 14 January and reached Baling at night.

4th Battery saw action south of Changlun on 10 January 1942. From the 11th, the position was subject to regular attacks by infantry and tanks. The left section of the battery was surrounded and captured. The right section withdrew in the dark to Tanjong Pau, but were back in action the next morning supporting 2/9 Jat on the right of the Jitra line. The line was penetrated on 13 January and the battery fell back to join the regimental headquarters at Gurun. This position was evacuated on 15 January and was at Ipoh on 20 January.

7th Battery was in support of 2/16 Punjab on the road from Jitra to Kodiang. On 8 December 1941, the battery covered the withdrawal of troops on the railway south of Padang Besar. Following the withdrawal demolitions were carried out. On 10 December, the battery attacked targets near Kodiang road, following which the airfield at Alor Star was evacuated. This was followed by a period of unverified reports of enemy advances, which lead to a hasty withdrawal on foot with loss of guns. The Japanese captured the headquarters of 6 Infantry Brigade at Gurun on the morning of 15 December. The battery moved to Bukit Mertajam with the regimental headquarters. The absence of air support and armour forced the withdrawal of 11 Division; and the R.H.Q. along with 4 and 7 batteries moved to Kampar on 22 December. 7th battery saw action three miles north of Kampar along with a British battalion of 6/15 Brigade. 10th battery joined the regiment on 27 December. On 28 December, the regiment was sent to Temoh as divisional reserve. On 30 December, 7th battery was sent to support 8 Indian Brigade at Teluk Anson, but was withdrawn after a day.

On 1 January 1942, the commanding officer Lieutenant Colonel Hughes was hospitalised and Major Cowie, the battery commander of 10th battery, took over command of the regiment. This was followed by two days of heavy Japanese attack at Kampar. All three batteries were in action on the Kampar-Teluk Anson road. 7th battery supported 28 Infantry Brigade north of Temoh during its withdrawal. On 3 January, 4th and 7th batteries were in support of the retreat of 2/1 Gurkha and 2/2 Gurkha south of Tapah.

The batteries being Corps reserve, moved back to Kuala Lumpur. Shortly after, 7th and 10th batteries were involved in supporting the eviction of the Japanese landing at Berjuntai. Major Scott of 7th battery was killed by enemy machine gun fire during this operation on 7 January. The regiment saw action at Labu during the retreat from Kuala Lumpur through the Seremban pass. From 22 January, the regiment was back fighting on the new line - Mersing-Kluang-Muar River, from where it withdrew to Skudai and finally to Singapore on 28 January.

At Singapore, the regiment was re-organised. The 4th battery was equipped with two 6 inch howitzers and its four 3.7 inch howitzers were handed over to the 7th and 10th batteries. Each battery then took over a 18 pounder gun for naval defence. The regiment (less 4th battery) supported the 6/15 Indian Infantry Brigade and later the 53 Infantry Brigade in the sector between Seletar creek and the causeway. On 5 February, 155 Field Regiment R.A. came under the command of the 22nd Mountain Regiment. The regiment saw action on multiple fronts – 21st battery at the Naval Base, 4th battery in support of 28 Infantry Brigade and at Serangoon Road in support of the 53 Infantry Brigade. Lieutenant Colonel Hughes reassumed command of the unit on 4 February. Major Cowie was killed by a shell splinter on 7 February. On 15 February, with fuel and water running out, the Battle of Singapore came to an end with the G.O.C. Lieutenant-General Arthur Ernest Percival deciding on a surrender. On 16 February, the regiment handed over the arms and ammunition to the Japanese and marched to Farrer Park into captivity.

Major E.L. Sawyer was awarded a M.B.E., Havildar Major Nur Khan a British Empire Medal, Naik Naurasab Khan a Military Medal and ten were mentioned in dispatches as prisoners of war. During their period of incarceration under the Japanese, some of the prisoners of war joined the Indian National Army and fought with the Japanese.

== Battle honours and awards ==
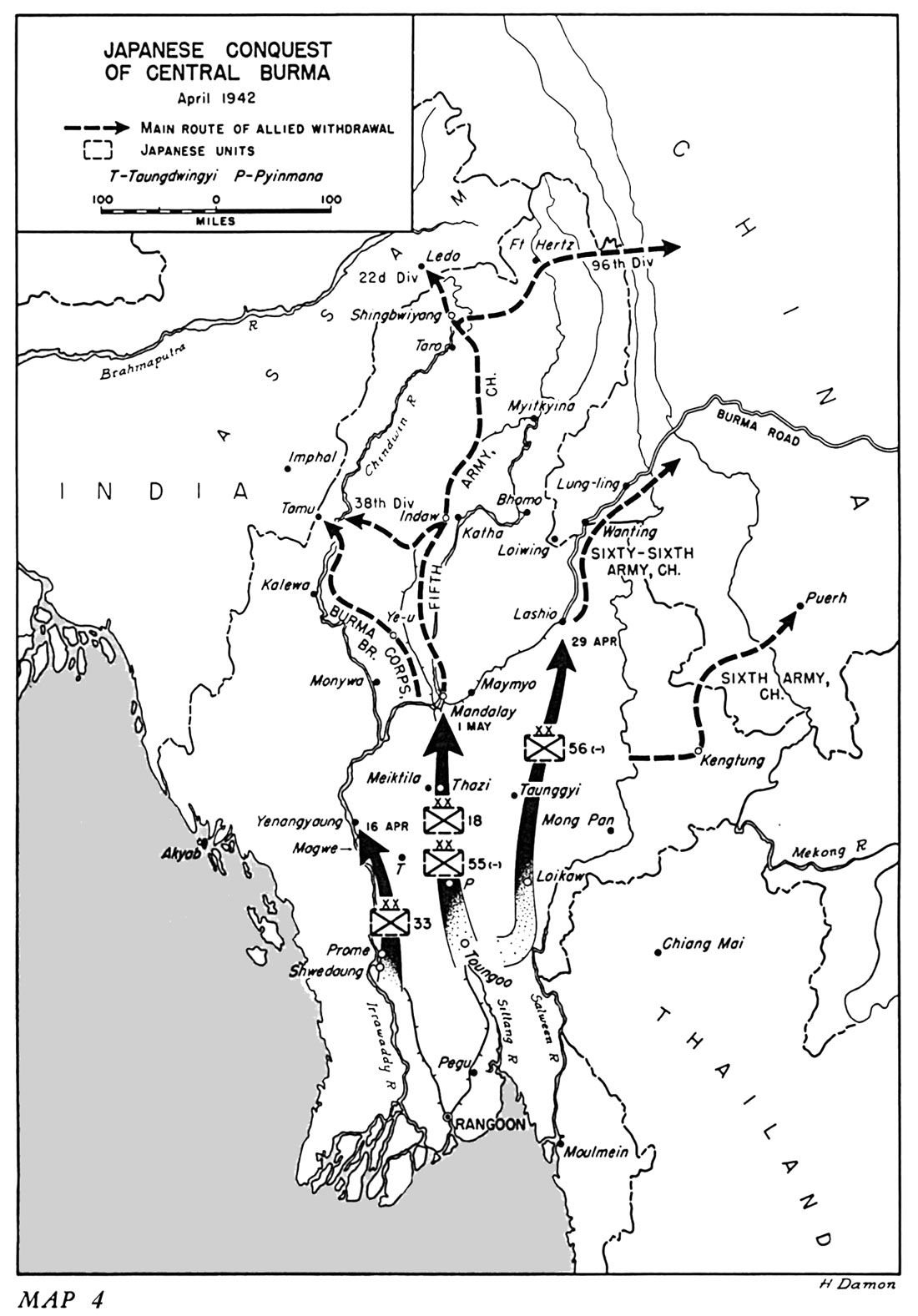
Japanese conquest of Central Burma, April 1942

- 4 Hazara Mountain Battery was awarded the honour title Jitra for the Battle of Jitra. The battery subsequently became part of 56 Field Regiment (Jitra), which was raised in April 1964 as 56 Mountain Composite Regiment (Pack). This unit carries the honour title.
- 2 (Derajat) Mountain Battery and 5 (Bombay) Mountain Battery were part of the 27th Mountain Regiment which took part in the Burma campaign. Both of them were awarded the honour titles Sittang and Yenang Yaung for their roles in the Battle of Sittang Bridge and Battle of Yenang Yaung in 1942. Both batteries joined the regiment after the war and 2 (Derajat) Mountain Battery is still part of 22 Medium Regiment. 5 (Bombay) Mountain Battery is presently part of 57 Field Regiment (Sittang & Yenang Yaung), which was raised in May 1964. Both these regiments carry the honour titles.
- The courageous action of Havildar Umrao Singh in battle of Kaladan Valley won him the highest gallantry award, the Victoria Cross. He became the only non-commissioned officer in the Royal Artillery (later the Indian Artillery) to be awarded Victoria Cross during World War II.

The official citation reads:

No. 44928 Havildar UMRAO SINGH, Indian Artillery. In the Kaladan Valley, in Burma, on 15th/16th December, 1944, Havildar Umrao Singh was in charge of one gun in an advanced section of his battery when it was subjected to heavy fire from 75 mm. guns and mortars for 1 ½ hours prior to being attacked by two Companies of Japanese. When the attack came he so inspired his gun detachment by his personal example and encouragement to fight and defend their gun, that they were able to beat off the attack with losses to the enemy. Though twice wounded by grenades in the first attack, he again held off the second enemy attack by skilful control of his detachment's small arms fire, and by manning a Bren gun himself which he fired over the shield of his gun at the Japanese who had got to within five yards range. Again the enemy were beaten off with heavy losses. Third and fourth attacks were also beaten off in the same manner by the resolute action and great courage of Havildar Umrao Singh. By this time all his gun detachment had been killed or wounded with the exception of himself and two others. When the final attack came, the other gun having been over-run and all his ammunition expended, he seized a gun bearer and calling once again on all who remained, he closed with the enemy in furious hand-to-hand fighting and was seen to strike down three Japanese in a desperate effort to save his gun, until he was overwhelmed and knocked senseless. Six hours later, when a counter-attack restored the position, he was found in an exhausted state beside his gun and almost unrecognisable with seven severe wounds, and ten dead Japanese round him. By his personal example and magnificent bravery Havildar Umrao Singh set a supreme example of gallantry and devotion to duty. When recovered, his gun was fit to fire and was in fact in action again and firing later that same day.

— The London Gazette.

Umrao Singh had served in the 33 Mountain Battery of 30th Mountain Regiment (raised 1942) during the war. The regiment was disbanded after the war and its troops were used to re-raise the 10th (Abbottabad) Mountain Battery of 22 Mountain Regiment, which had been captured in Malaya.

== Post World War II ==
Between 1944 and 1946, all Indian units were converted to single class units. For example, 2nd Derajat had Sikhs and 5th Bombay had Ahirs. Following the victory in the Second World War, many regiments were disbanded and the same fate awaited the mountain batteries. Ten were retained as mountain batteries, six were put into suspended animation, nine were converted to field batteries and the rest disbanded. Regarding the fate of the captured batteries in Singapore, 21st Mountain Battery was disbanded, 4th Hazara and 7th Bengal were revived; 33rd and 34th batteries which were in service in the second Arakan operation with the 26 Indian Division joined to form the 10th Abbottabad Battery. 4th, 5th and 10th batteries under 22nd Mountain Regiment went to Peshawar in June 1946, from where the 5th and 10th went for operations in the North-West Frontier Province. On 20 February 1947, 10th battery was put into suspended animation.

At the time of independence, the Indian Army had twenty five mountain batteries, of which eight went to the newly created state of Pakistan. Of the remaining seventeen batteries, six of the oldest batteries were retained as mountain batteries, and were allotted to -

- 22 Mountain Regiment
  - 4th (Hazara) Mountain Battery (Frontier Force)
  - 5th (Bombay) Mountain Battery
  - 7th (Bengal) Mountain Battery
- 24 Mountain Regiment
  - 2nd (Derajat) Mountain Battery (Frontier Force)
  - 9th (Murree) Mountain Battery
  - 12th (Poonch) Mountain Battery

24 Mountain Regiment was soon converted to a medium regiment along with two of its mountain batteries. 2 (Derajat) Mountain Battery (Frontier Force) joined 22 Mountain Regiment.

== Indo-Pakistani War of 1947–1948 ==
Lieutenant Colonel Mohinder Singh, MC was the commanding officer of the regiment during the war. 7 (Bengal) Mountain Battery took part in the capture of Chhamb on 10 December 1947. In the Poonch sector, the battle situation became grim for Indian troops by December 1947. The Indian Air Force (IAF) landed a section of 4 (Hazara) Mountain Battery in Poonch on 13 December, equipped with 3.7 inch howitzers. The use of artillery stabilised the situation.

In the battle of Naushera, artillery support provided by the guns of 5 (Bombay) and 7 Mountain Batteries of the regiment along with 11 and 16 Field Regiments, with timely assistance by the IAF was instrumental in turning the tide. On 30 January 1948, the regimental headquarters and 7 Battery were part of Operation Kipper, the operation by 50 Para Brigade Group under Brigadier Mohammad Usman to dislodge the enemy from area Kot-Pathradi-Uparla-Dandesar. On 18 March 1948, 5 and 7 Batteries were part of the force in the recapture of Jhangar.

In April 1948, 5 and 7 Mountain Batteries were part of the advance to Rajauri. 5 Battery was part of the thrust towards Samai-Sadabad area and 7 Battery was involved in the raid on Sabzkot. In June 1948, 5 Battery saw action during the link up to Poonch and then the capture of Bhimber Gali in support of 5 Brigade.

The regiment won the following gallantry awards during the war-

- Vir Chakra
  - Major Bhagwan Singh
  - Lieutenant Kartar Singh Sandhu
  - Havildar Ishwar Singh
- Mentioned in dispatches
  - Captain Ami Chand, Jemadar Ram Pat Singh, Jemadar Chandgi Ram, Jemadar Balwant Singh, Havildar Major Kishan Lal, Naik Gaja Nand, Lance Naik Amar Chand, Lance Naik Ram Nath, Lance Naik Ram Pat, OWA Siri Ram, OWA Siri Chand, Wireless Operator Har Lal, Driver Mata Din, Lieutenant Pritam Singh, Lance Naik Khem Chand, Gunner Bhagwan Singh.

== Corps d'elite ==
Prior to independence, the Indian gunners did not wear a lanyard, the exception being the white lanyard on the right shoulder by the Kohat Mountain Battery (Frontier Force). In 1952, an army order designated 22 Mountain Regiment with its four batteries as Corps d'elite and making them entitled to wear a new lanyard with colours of the artillery (red and blue). This was to be worn on the right shoulder, as was customary for regiments which had been conferred the Royal title. (Regiment of Indian Artillery had been conferred with the Royal title in 1945 for their services in the Second World War.) Though initially meant only for the officers of 22 Mountain Regiment, it was subsequently allowed for and adopted by all gunners of the Indian Army.

== Sino-Indian War ==
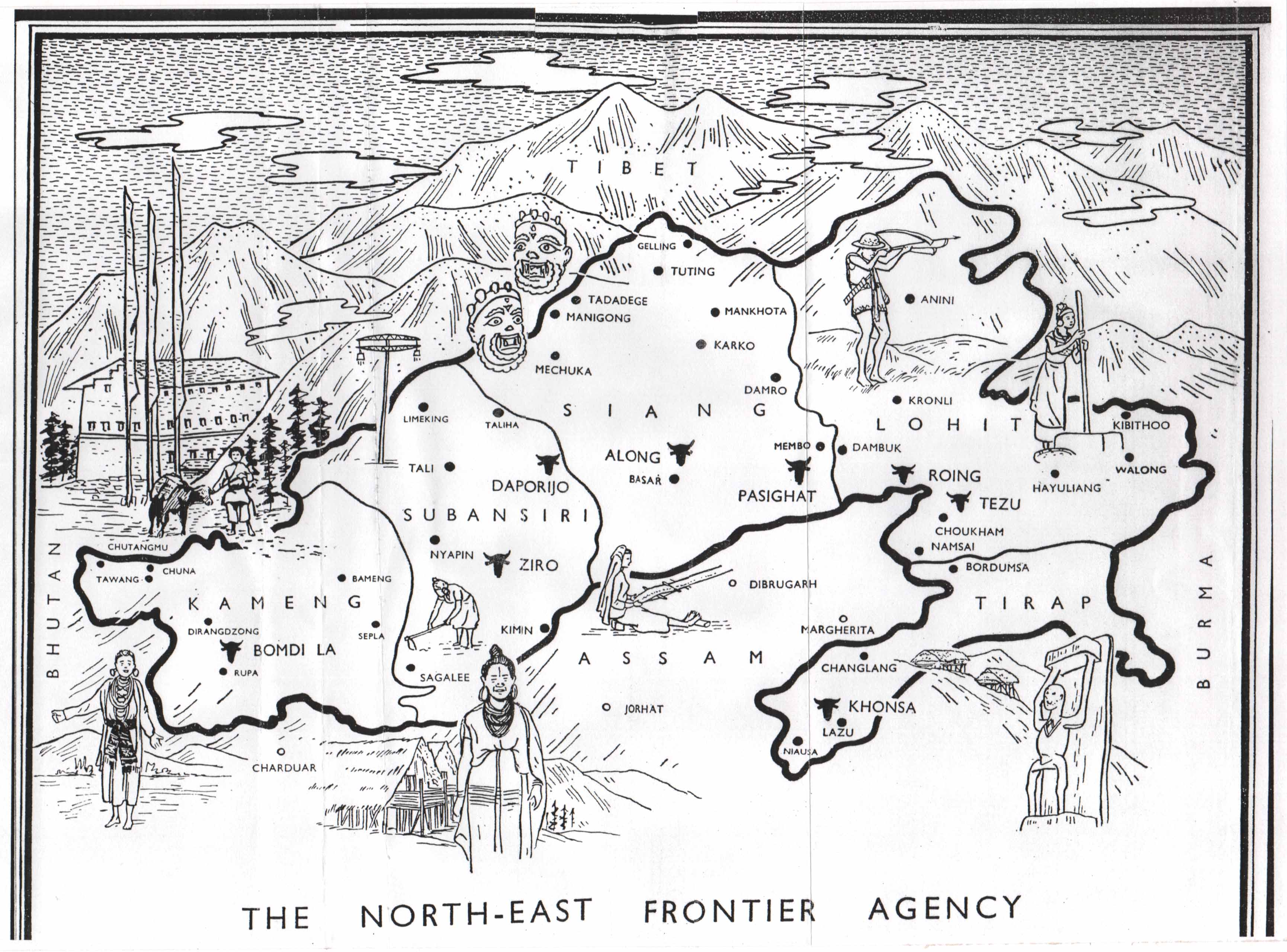
Map of North East Frontier Agency by Verrier Elwin, 1959

The regiment equipped with 3.7 inch howitzers and was commanded by Lieutenant Colonel Bhupinder Singh. It was part of 4 Artillery Brigade and saw action in the eastern sector of war – in North-East Frontier Agency . 7 (Bengal) Mountain Battery was located at Tawang. Regimental headquarters and 2 (Derajat) Mountain Battery reached Tawang from Misamari on 8 October 1962.

Following commencement of operations, 22 Mountain Regiment, less two batteries was at Tawang. 7 (Bengal) Mountain Battery of 22 Field Regiment was deployed at Milaktong La (10 km South of Bum La). 2 (Derajat) Mountain Battery was deployed at Lao Basti along Jang axis and two guns of this battery, without ammunition were located at Mukdang La and were placed in support of the infantry blocking the approach through Bum La. The regiment gave good supporting fine in support of 1 Sikh during the withdrawal from Tawang. 7 (Bengal) Mountain Battery, deployed at Mi La withdrew on the evening of 23 October bringing back all their guns on animals. 2 (Derajat) Mountain Battery at Mukdang La could not withdraw two of its guns, as there were no animals at the gun positions, and they had to be destroyed.

Following the withdrawal from Tawang, the regiment saw action at multiple locations - one battery less section was in support of 62 Brigade south of Se La and headquarters with one battery in support of 48 Brigade in Bomdila sector. One section of mountain guns of 2 (Derajat) Mountain Battery was deployed with C Company of 4 Garhwal Rifles between Nuranang and Jang, where it carried out direct howitzer shelling on Chinese locations across the Tawang Chu River in early November. It also engaged the enemy accurately in Battle of Nuranang, including close range direct engagements with the Chinese. One section of 2 (Derajat) Mountain Battery took part in the battle of Bomdila and also fought in hand-to-hand combat against the Chinese. A total 20 gallant men of the regiment, including three officers were martyred in this war.

== Re-organisation of batteries ==
In 1963-1964, the regiment had to shed off two of its batteries - 4 (Hazara) battery to 56 Mountain Regiment and 5 (Bombay) battery to 57 Mountain Regiment. The regiment then raised its own battery, 221 Mountain Battery.

== Indo-Pakistani War of 1971 ==
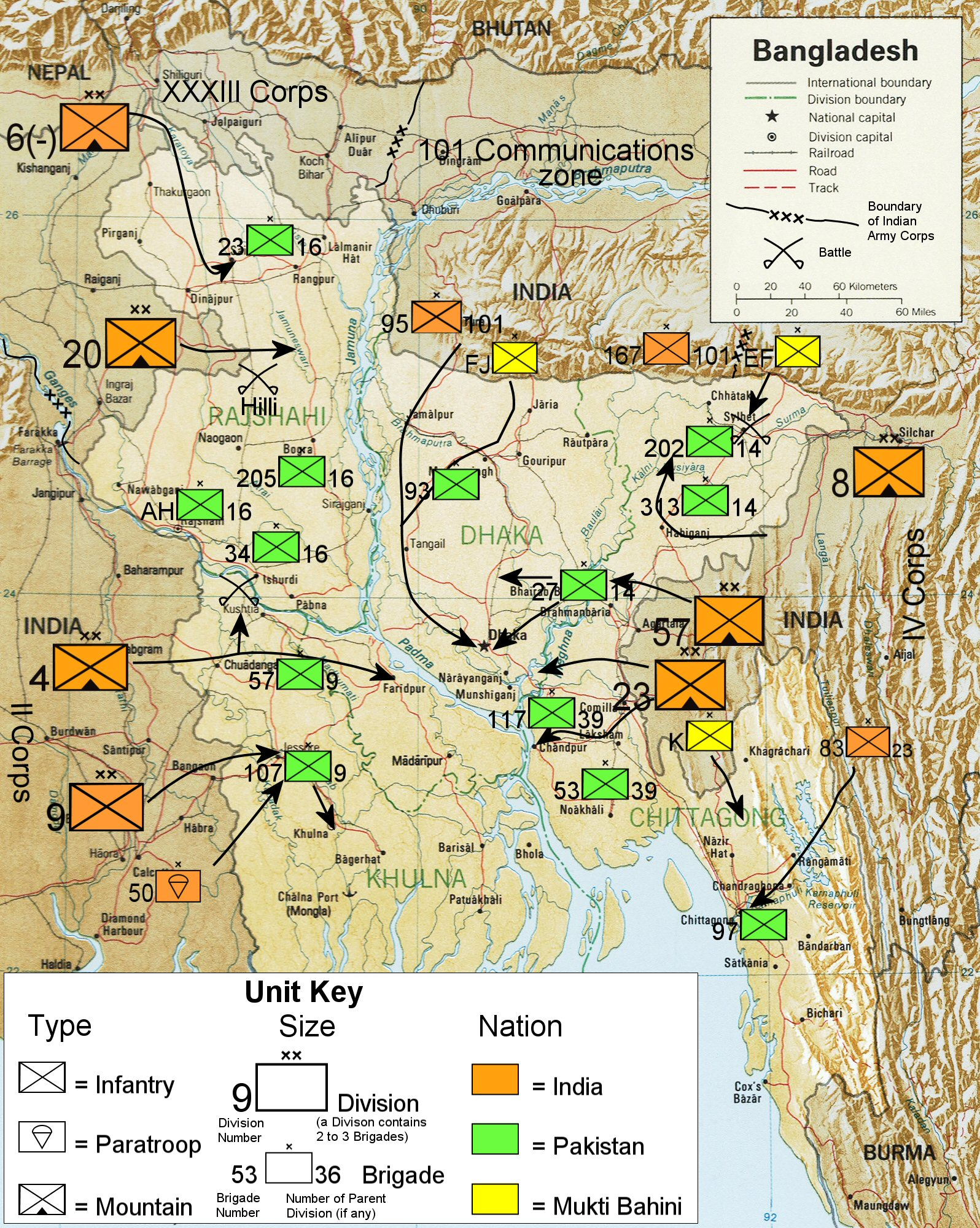
An illustration showing military units and troop movements during operations in the Eastern sector

The regiment was part of 4 Mountain Artillery Brigade of 4 Mountain Division. The division was part of 2 Corps and saw operations in the South Western sector in the Bangladesh Liberation War. It was equipped with the 76 mm mountain guns. The war in Eastern Theatre commenced with the salvo fired by 7 (Bengal) Mountain Battery. The firepower of the regiment proved decisive in numerous battles including Battle of Madhumati River and raid of Dhopakali. Interestingly, when Major General MH Ansari, GOC of the Pakistani 9 Infantry Division, who was an ex-officer of Indian 22 Mountain Regiment, surrendered with three thousand troops to Major General Mohinder Singh Barar, the GOC of 4 Mountain Division on 16 December 1971, he was apprised that his own regiment was part of the forces fighting him. He remarked on surrendering, ‘I am glad that I have surrendered to my own regiment’.

The Sena Medal was awarded to Second Lieutenant Govind Raya Gaonkar and Gunner (TA) Hari Charan Singh Yadav.

== Post 1971 ==
The regiment is presently a medium regiment and has been part of counter insurgency operations in Jammu and Kashmir and in North East India. The regiment was also deployed in the Siachen Glacier, the highest battlefield in the world from 2017 to 2019.

== Regimental batteries ==
A brief history of the formation and evolution of the two oldest batteries of the regiment-

2nd (Derajat) Battery

- Raised in 1849 by Lieutenant D McNeill as a field battery at Dera Ghazi Khan from disbanded Sikh artillerymen, following the 2nd Sikh War
- In 1851, No 3 Horse Light Field Battery, Punjab Irregular Force; but was commonly known as No 3 Punjab Light Field Battery
- In 1865, became No 3 Horse Light Field Battery, Punjab Frontier Force
- In 1876, No 2 Mountain Battery, P.F.F.
- In 1879, No 2 (Derajat) Mountain Battery, P.F.F.
- In 1901, Derajat Mountain Battery
- In 1903, 22nd Derajat Mountain Battery (Frontier Force)
- In 1920, 22nd Derajat Pack Battery (F.F.)
- In 1921, 102nd (Derajat) Pack Battery (Frontier Force)
- In 1927, 2nd (Derajat) Mountain Battery R.A., F.F.
- In 1939 became the 2nd Derajat Mountain Battery F.F.
- Battle honours –

- Charasiah
- Kabul, 1879
- Kandahar, 1880
- Afghanistan, 1878-80
- Chitral
- Tirah
- Punjab Frontier
- Narungombe
- E.Africa 1916-18
- Sittang 1942
- Yenangyaung 1942

7th (Bengal) Battery

- Raised in 1886 by Captain C.P. Triscott at Rawalpindi as No. 1 Bengal Mountain Battery
- In 1889, No. 7 (Bengal) Mountain Battery
- In 1901, Gujarat Mountain Battery
- In 1903, 27th Mountain Battery
- In 1920, 27th Pack Battery
- In 1921, 107th (Bengal) Pack Battery
- In 1927, 7th (Bengal) Mountain Battery
- In 1928, 7th (Bengal) Mountain Battery, R.A.
- Battle honours –

- Burma1885-87
- Afghanistan, 1919
- Kilimanjaro
- Narungombe
- Nyangao
- E.Africa 1916-18

== Notable Officers ==
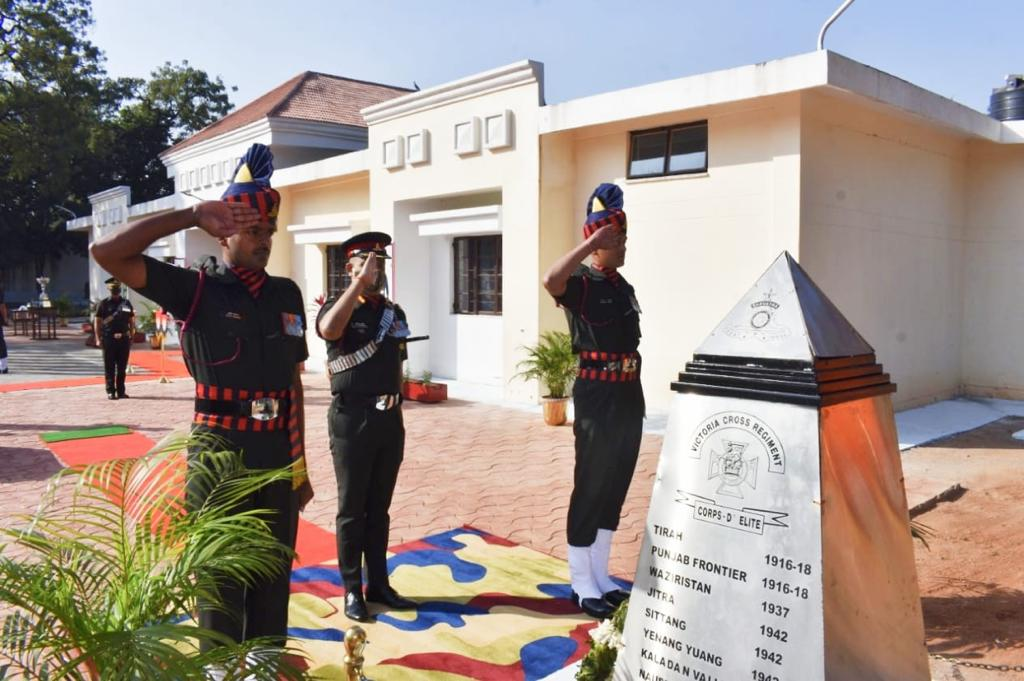
22 Medium Regiment celebrating the 76th Victoria Cross Day on 15 December 2020 to commemorate valour and selfless service by Havildar (Honorary Captain) Umrao Singh in World War II at Kaladan Valley in 1944.

- Richard Mervyn Hare – noted English moral philosopher, served the regiment during the Second World War and was captured by the Japanese during the fall of Singapore.
- Major General Mohinder Singh MVC, MC – was the first Indian Commanding Officer of the regiment. In the 1965 war, he commanded the 15 Infantry Division and was awarded the Maha Vir Chakra.
- Lieutenant General Sartaj Singh PB, GM – commanded the unit from 1954 to 1956. Later Director General Military Operations (DGMO), GOC 15 Corps during the 1971 war, GOC-in-C Southern Command from 27 January 1973 to 31 July 1974.
- Major General Rajendra Prakash VSM
- Major General Sujan Singh Uban PVSM, AVSM– commanded the regiment, was the first Inspector General of Special Frontier Force. The SFF is also known as Establishment 22, as Uban had named the new covert group after his regiment.
- Brigadier Darshan Khullar – mountaineer, author and historian. Commissioned into the unit in 1961 as a young officer and fought the 1962 India China War as a battery commander of 2 (Derajat) Mountain Battery. Recipient of Padma Shri, Arjuna award and Ati Vishisht Seva Medal.
- Captain Amitendra Kumar Singh – was part of the 51 Special Action Group of the National Security Guard (NSG) during the 2008 Mumbai attacks. He was awarded the Shaurya Chakra for his brave actions.
- Lieutenant Colonel Kuldip Singh Ludra – author from Institute for Strategic Studies Research & Analysis (ISSRA)

== See also ==
- List of artillery regiments of Indian Army
