= 56 Field Regiment (India) =

Indian Army artillery unit

- Active: 1964 – present
- Country: India
- Allegiance: India
- Branch: Indian Army
- Type: Artillery
- Size: Regiment
- Motto(s): Sarvatra, Izzat-O-Iqbal (Everywhere with Honour and Glory).
- Colors: Red & Navy Blue
- Anniversaries: 15 April – Raising Day
- Battle honours: Jitra

Insignia
- Abbreviation: 56 Fd Regt

56 Field Regiment (Jitra) is part of the Regiment of Artillery of the Indian Army.

== Formation ==
The regiment was raised on 15 April 1964 at Aurangabad as 56 Mountain Composite Regiment (Pack). Lieutenant Colonel Kailas Prasad (Tom) Pandey was first commanding officer. The unit is presently a field regiment.

== Batteries ==
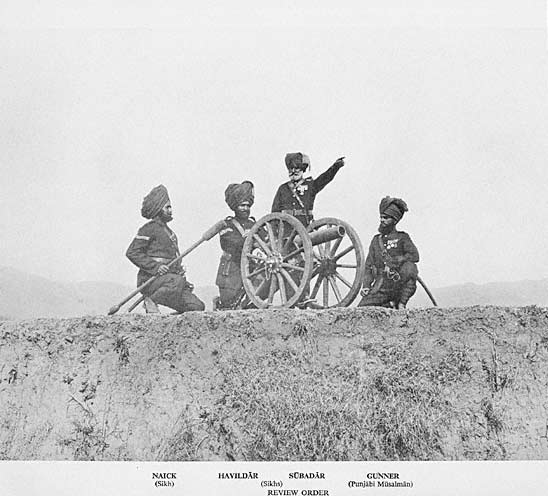
Photograph, circa 1895 showing a RML 7-pounder mountain gun of No. 4 (Hazara) Mountain Battery listing the crew's ranks

At the time of formation, the regiment had the following three batteries:

4 (Hazara) Mountain Battery (Frontier Force)

This battery joined the regiment from 22 Mountain Regiment. It is one of the oldest and most decorated mountain batteries. It was formed at Haripur (presently in Hazara, Khyber Pukhtunkhwa, Pakistan) from a small body of Hazara gunners raised by Major James Abbott for local defence between 1848 and 1849. The troop nucleus of a native officer and twenty men was from the artillery of Shaikh Imam-ud-Din, who was the governor of the Sikh province of Kashmir. On 2 April 1851, Lieutenant G.G. Pearse, Madras Artillery was appointed in charge of the Hazara Mountain Train, in addition to his duties as the Assistant Commissioner.

The battery has gone through many name changes:

- Hazara Mountain Train
- In 1856, Hazara Mountain Train Battery, Punjab Irregular Force
- In 1865, Hazara Mountain Battery, Punjab Frontier Force
- In 1876, No. 4 (Hazara) Mountain Battery, Punjab Frontier Force
- In 1901, Hazara Mountain Battery
- In 1903, 24th Hazara Mountain Battery (Frontier Force)
- In 1920, 24th Hazara Pack Battery (Frontier Force)
- In 1921, 104th (Hazara) Pack Battery (Frontier Force)
- In 1927, 4th (Hazara) Mountain Battery (Frontier Force)
- In 1932, 4th (Hazara) Mountain Battery, R.A., F.F.

The battery has won the following battle honours:

- Ali Masjid
- Kabul, 1879
- Afghanistan, 1878-80
- Burma 1885–87
- Chitral
- E.Africa 1917-18
- Jitra

145 Mountain Battery (Pack)

This battery joined the regiment from 52 Mountain Regiment (Pack). It was incidentally raised in 1952 by Lieutenant Colonel KP Pande, the first commanding officer of the regiment.

563 Mountain Battery

This youngest battery was raised along with the regiment in 1964.

== Operations ==
The regiment has taken part in the following operations:

Indo-Pakistani War of 1971

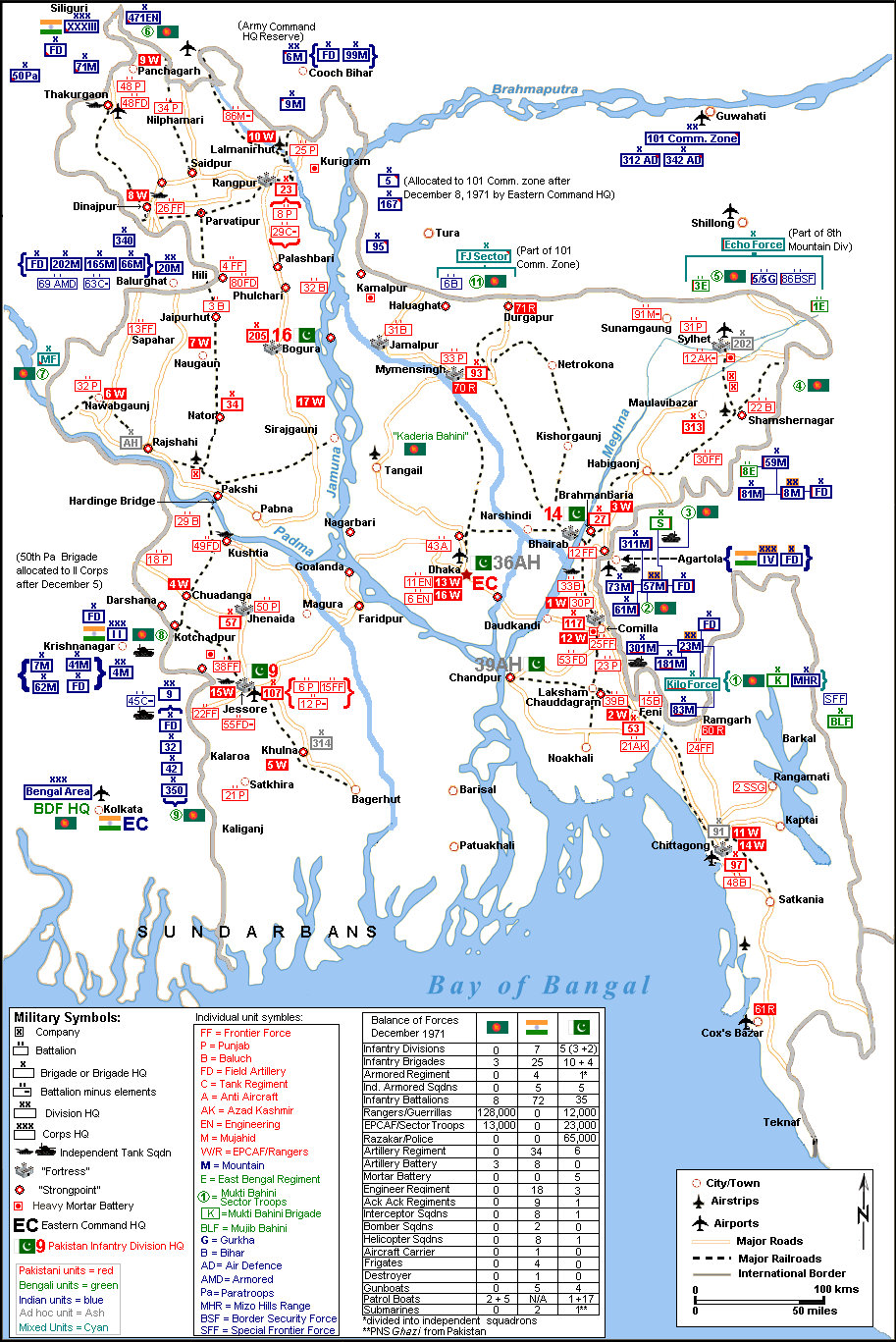
Deployment of troops in the eastern sector during the 1971 war

The regiment was part of 95 Mountain Brigade deployed in the northern sector for the liberation of Bangladesh. It was equipped with 76 mm guns. On 3 November 1971, the regiment provided artillery support to 13 Rajputana Rifles in the capture of Telikhali (east of Jamalpur-Tura-Sherpur road). The regiment lost one gunner (Gunner Raja Gopal Pandurang) and two officers wounded.

The regiment took part in the battles at Jamalpur and Kamalpur. At Kamalpur, it provided accurate artillery support to 1 Maratha Light Infantry and 13 Guards. During the capture of Kamalpur on 4 December 1971, Captain Vijai Pratap Singh of 4 Hazara Battery was the Forward Observation Officer with 13 Guards. Once the company commander of 13 Guards got injured, he took charge. But soon after, he along with his radio operator Gunner Hans Raj were killed by enemy fire. Bahadur Singh, the technical assistant took over the role and directed fire on the enemy. The enemy surrendered on the evening of the same day.

The regiment won the following gallantry awards:

- Vir Chakra – Captain Vijai Pratap Singh (posthumous)
- Mentioned in dispatches –Captain Charan Singh Bahara

Other operations

- Operation Trident
- Operation Falcon
- Operation Rakshak – the regiment took part in counter insurgency operations in Punjab between 1991 and 1992.
- Operation Rhino – counter insurgency operations in Assam between 2000 and 2003.
- Operation Meghdoot – the regiment was posted in the highest battlefield in the world, Siachen Glacier between 2008 and 2010.

== Honours and achievements ==
- 4 (Hazara) Mountain Battery (Frontier Force), which was then part of 22 Mountain Regiment took part in the Battle of Jitra from 11 to 13 December 1941. This battle was fought between the invading Japanese and Allied forces during the Malayan campaign of the Second World War. The battery was awarded the battle honour Jitra and the regiment continues to carry this honour title.
- The first commanding officer of the regiment, Brigadier KP Pande was awarded the Maha Vir Chakra for his gallant actions, while commanding 61 Mountain Brigade Group during the Indo-Pakistani War of 1971.

== Affiliation ==
1st Battalion, 5th Gorkha Rifles (Frontier Force), popularly known as FASFIF is affiliated to 56 Field Regiment (Jitra).

== See also ==
- List of artillery regiments of Indian Army
