= 42 Medium Regiment (India) =

42 Medium Regiment (Dera Baba Nanak)
- Active: 1948 – present
- Country: India
- Branch: Indian Army
- Type: Artillery
- Size: Regiment
- Mottos: Sarvatra, Izzat-O-Iqbal (Everywhere with Honour and Glory)
- Colors: Red & Navy Blue
- Anniversaries: 1 August – Raising Day; 5 December – Battle Honour Day
- Equipment: 155/45 mm Sharang guns
- Battle honours: Dera Baba Nanak

Insignia
- Abbreviation: 42 Med Regt

42 Medium Regiment (Dera Baba Nanak) is part of the Regiment of Artillery of the Indian Army.

== Formation ==
42 Field Regiment was raised at Jhansi on 1 August 1948 by Lieutenant Colonel (later Major General) AS Naravane with a class composition of North Indians. The unit consists of 57, 58 and 59 medium batteries.

== Operations ==
The regiment has taken part in the following operations–

Indo-Pakistani War of 1965

42 Field Regiment was deployed in Jammu and Kashmir under 19 Infantry Division of 15 Corps during Operation Riddle. The unit was located in Poonch during the war and was equipped with 25-pounder guns. The unit provided artillery support during the war and also used its guns in direct firing role to cause substantial damage to Pothi. The unit lost 15 soldiers, while 65 were injured. Among the killed was Captain Surjit Singh, who was the adjutant of the regiment.

Indo-Pakistani War of 1971

42 Field Regiment was under 15 Artillery Brigade of 15 Infantry Division during Operation Cactus Lily. The regiment commanded by Lieutenant Colonel Ashok Mangalik was in support of 86 Infantry Brigade of 15 Infantry Division. 86 Infantry Brigade was tasked to capture Dera Bana Nanak Bridge and this operation was codenamed Operation Akal. The brigade launched an offensive into enemy territory on the night of 5 December 1971, and finally captured the bridge by early morning of 6 December, thus being the first formation to hoist the tricolour in the captured territory of West Pakistan. 42 Field Regiment played a crucial role in providing artillery support during the battle of Dera Bana Nanak and for its efforts, the regiment was awarded the honour title Dera Bana Nanak.

Other operations

- Operation Falcon – 1989–1991.
- Operation Rakshak – Counter terrorist operations between 1991 and 1992, 1995-1997 and 2013–2016.
- Operation Parakram – 2001–2003.
- Operation Rhino – Counter insurgency operations in Assam between 2003 and 2006. The regiment successfully operated in the jungles of Karbi Anglong and in Nagaon district.
- Operation Snow Leopard – 2021–2023.

== Equipment ==
The regiment has used the following guns in chronological order –

- 25 Pounder guns
- 75/24 Pack Howitzer
- 100 mm field gun
- 105 mm Light Field Gun
- 122 mm howitzer
- M-46 130 mm Field Gun
- 155/45 mm Sharang

== Gallantry awards ==
The regiment has won the following gallantry awards –

- Vir Chakra – 2
  - Captain Jitendra Kumar (Operation Cactus Lily)
  - Major Pradeep Kumar Sharma (Operation Cactus Lily)
- Shaurya Chakra – 1
  - Lieutenant Krishan Dayal Singh Rathore (Operation Rhino)
- Sena Medal – 5
  - Lieutenant Colonel Ashok Mangalik (Operation Cactus Lily)
  - Naik Mool Chand (Operation Cactus Lily)
  - Lance Naik Mahendra Singh Yadav (Operation Rhino)
- Chief of the Army Staff Commendation Cards – 18
- General Officer Commanding-in Chiefs Commendation Cards – 61

== Notable officers ==
- Major General AS Naravane – first commanding officer and later Colonel Commandant of Regiment of Artillery.
- General Om Prakash Malhotra PVSM – commanded the regiment and went on to become the 10th Chief of Army Staff of the Indian Army.
- Lieutenant General Ashok Mangalik PVSM SM - commissioned in 42 Field Regiment on 28 December 1952 and was the Director General Artillery from 1 March 1989 to 30 June 1991.
- Lieutenant General Madan Mohan Lakhera PVSM AVSM VSM -served the regiment during the 1965 war. He went on to become the Adjutant-General and later was the Governor of the state of Mizoram and the Lieutenant Governor of the Union Territory of Puducherry.
- Brigadier Kailash Prasad Pande MVC – He joined the regiment after the princely state's forces were amalgamated with the Indian Army.

== See also ==
- List of artillery regiments of Indian Army
