= Kailas Prasad Pandey =

Indian Army Officer

Brigadier Kailash Prasad Pande MVC
- Born: 4 July 1925; Madhya Pradesh, India
- Died: 4 February 2010 (aged 84); Deolali, Maharashtra, India
- Military career
- Allegiance: India
- Branch: Indian Army
- Rank: Brigadier
- Nickname: Tom Pande
- Unit: Regiment of Artillery
- Commands: 61 Mountain Brigade; 2 Mountain Brigade; 56 Mountain Composite Regiment; 145 Mountain Battery
- Conflicts: Indo-Pakistani War of 1971; Indo-Pakistani War of 1965
- Awards: Maha Vir Chakra

Brigadier Kailash Prasad Pande, MVC (10 Dec 1925 - 4 February 2010) was an officer in the Indian Army, who served with the Regiment of Artillery. He was awarded the Maha Vir Chakra, India's second highest award for his role in the Indo-Pakistani War of 1971.

== Early life ==
Brigadier Kailash Prasad Pande was born on 4 July 1925 in a Kanyakubja Brahmin family with a strong military tradition, in the then Central Provinces (now Madhya Pradesh). He studied at Gwalior's Victoria College, now known as Maharani Laxmi Bai Govt. College Of Excellence, where the former Prime Minister of India, Shri Atal Behari Vajpayee was his classmate.

== Military career ==
Kailash Prasad Pande was commissioned into the Gwalior State Forces on August 25, 1945. After the independence of India, the princely state's forces were amalgamated with the Indian Army and ‘Tom’ Pande joined 42 Field Regiment of the Regiment of Artillery. He served in 52 Mountain Regiment (Pack), where he raised 145 Mountain Battery (Pack). In 1964, Lieutenant Colonel Pande raised and also commanded 56 Mountain Composite Regiment (Pack). He had a two-year tenure at the Indian Military Academy as a Battalion Commander. In 1970, he was promoted to the rank of Brigadier and took command of 2 Mountain Artillery Brigade deployed in Arunachal Pradesh.

During the Indo-Pakistani War of 1971, Brigadier Kailash Prasad Pandey commanded the 61 Mountain Brigade, which was deployed in the Eastern sector. He planned his attacks meticulously and led the brigade in successfully taking a number of objectives through intense and heavy combat. Advancing rapidly and covering 40 miles in 72 hours, his brigade achieved a number of victories including Chandina, Daudkhandi and Mynawati. At Mynawati, he forced the garrison to surrender and accepted the surrender of the garrison commander Brigadier Sheikh Mansoor Hussain Attif, Commander of 117 Infantry Brigade of the Pakistan Army, along with 5,000 troops and 50 officers. In recognition of his achievements, and for his demonstration of leadership and bravery in the field, Brigadier Kailash Prasad Pande was awarded the Maha Vir Chakra, India's second highest gallantry award.

== Later life ==
Brigadier Pande, superannuated in July 1979 and settled down in Bhopal, his hometown. After retirement, he was appointed as Director of Home Guards by the Madhya Pradesh Government. He also became secretary of the Madhya Pradesh Rajya Sainik Board. He was made in-charge of the Red Cross Organization in Bhopal and was responsible for providing relief to the Bhopal Gas Tragedy victims. He was also sent to Jaffna, Sri Lanka as part of a Red Cross delegation in 1988.

Brigadier Kailash Prasad Pandey died on 4 February 2010 in Deolali, Maharashtra. Major General Yash Pande is his son and a surgeon in the Indian Army.

General Deepak Kapoor, the 22nd Chief of the Army Staff is his son-in-law.

== See also ==
Indo-Pakistani War of 1971
