= 52 Medium Regiment =

Indian Army artillery unit

- Active: 1961 – present
- Country: India
- Allegiance: India
- Branch: Indian Army
- Type: Artillery
- Size: Regiment
- Mottos: Sarvatra, Izzat-O-Iqbal (Everywhere with Honour and Glory)
- Colors: Red & Navy Blue
- Anniversaries: 1 March – Raising Day; 3 September – Battle honour day
- Battle honours: Sanjoi Mirpur

Insignia
- Abbreviation: 52 Med Regt

52 Medium Regiment (Sanjoi Mirpur) is part of the Regiment of Artillery of the Indian Army.

== Formation and history ==
The regiment was raised as 52 Mountain Regiment on 1 March 1961 at Bareilly Cantonment. The first commanding officer was Lieutenant Colonel (later Brigadier) NR Subramaniam and the unit was equipped with 3.7 inch howitzers. 145 Mountain Battery of the regiment moved to 56 Mountain Composite Regiment (Pack), when the latter was raised in April 1964. The regiment was subsequently converted to a field regiment and is presently a medium regiment.

== Operations ==
The regiment has taken part in the following operations –

Indo-Pakistani War of 1965

52 Mountain Composite Regiment (Pack) was part of 15 Corps artillery. The regiment took part in Operation Riddle and was awarded the honour title Sanjoi Mirpur for its determined and devastating actions in battles at Sanjoi Top and Mirpur Bridge. (Note: 4 Kumaon and 3/8 Gorkha Rifles were also awarded the battle honour of Sanjoi Mirpur.)

138 (Dehradun) Mountain Battery (Pack) of the regiment took part in operations in the Tithwal sector in Kupwara district of Jammu and Kashmir. The battery was commanded by Major Shyam Sunder Wadhwa. It fought intensely in the heroic battles of Sanjoi, Mirpur, Point 9013 (Kumaon Hill), Bugina Bulge and Jura Bridge. The battery equipped with howitzers along with 25-pounder guns of 17 Field Battery from 7 Field Regiment ably supported 1 Sikh less two companies during the attack and capture of the Pakistani post on Richhmar Ridge on 24 August 1965. The battery used direct fire from temporary positions to destroy bunkers at Upper and Lower Sanjoi. It then supported 3/8 Gorkha Rifles during the capture of Sanjoi on the night of 3 September and helped deflect the two furious counter-attacks on nights of 4/5 September and 6/7 September. The battery helped support the capture of Mirpur heights. It supported 4 Kumaon during the capture of Point 9013 on the night of 20 September. The capture of Point 9013 gave Indian troops complete domination of the Mirpur area up to Jura Bridge on the River Kishanganga. The battery then provided fire support to 4 Kumaon during the infiltration and destruction of Jura bridge.

The regiment lost two officers, one Junior Commissioned Officer and 19 soldiers during the operations. In addition to the honour title, it was awarded one Sena Medal (Captain Prakash Gadre), two Mentioned in dispatches and six commendation cards.

Indo-Pakistani War of 1971

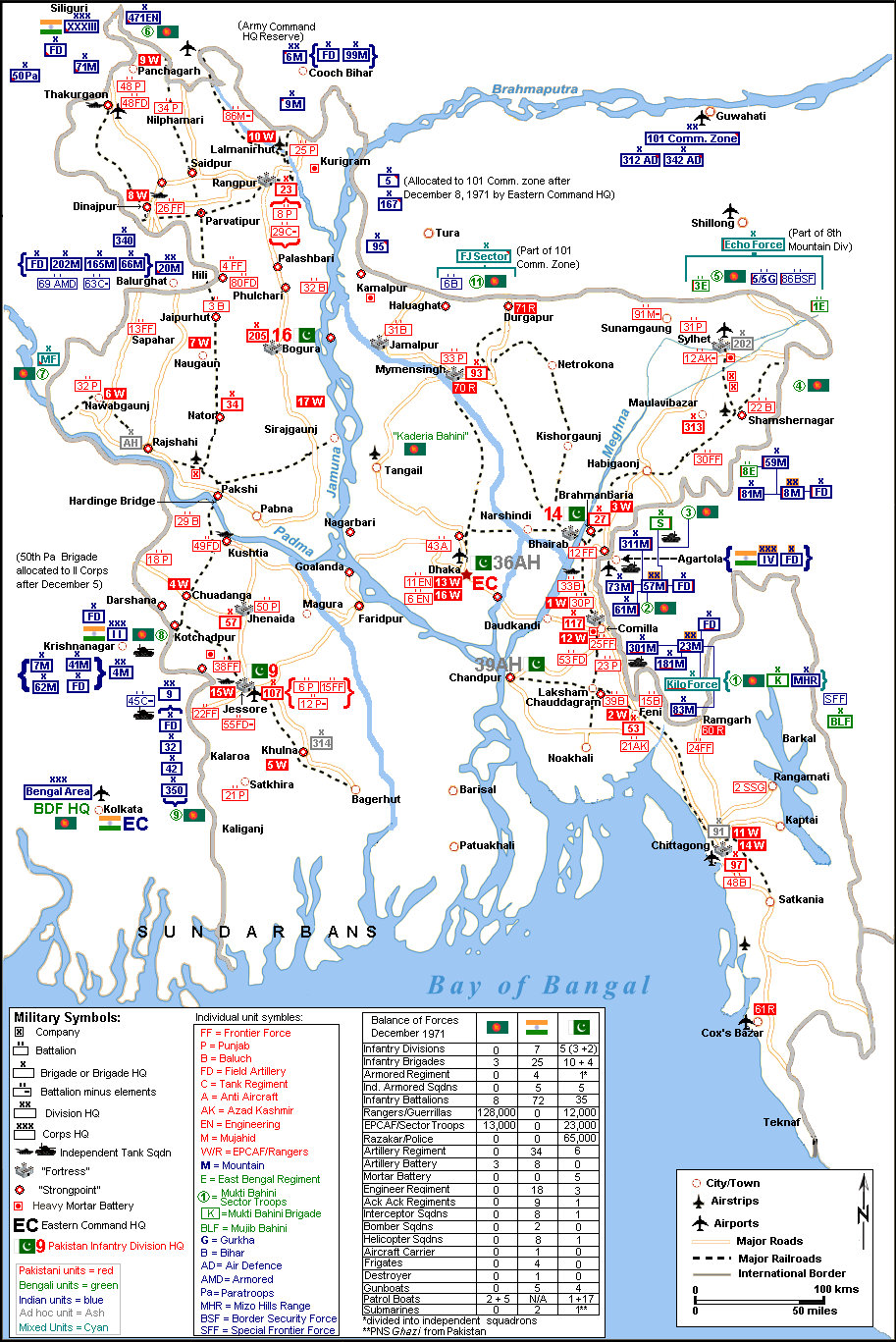
Deployment of troops in the eastern sector during the 1971 war

The regiment saw action during Operation Cactus Lily between 9 November and 28 December 1971 in the Eastern Sector. It saw actions in the battles at Bhurungamari and Lalmonirhat. During the Bhurungamari operations, it was part of the 6 Mountain Division operations and under 9 Mountain Brigade. During this operation, Captain Tirath Singh was awarded a Vir Chakra for bravery. The regiment also won a Sena Medal.

Disaster management

The regiment was involved in firefighting operations at Bharatpur Bird Sanctuary in 1986. It was awarded eight Chief of Army Staff Commendation Cards and one GOC-in-C Commendation Card for its resourceful efforts.

Counterterrorism operations

The regiment was involved in counterterrorism operations in Punjab and Jammu and Kashmir as part of Operation Rakshak -

- 20 August 1990 to 26 August 1991 – Moga sector followed by Khemkaran in Punjab.
- 1996 - Pouni, Jammu and Kashmir – During this tenure, the regiment was awarded one GOC-in-C Commendation Card for arresting a terrorist on the night of 18/19 March 1996.
- 2009-2012 – Baramulla - one GOC-in-C Commendation Card was awarded during this tenure.

Operation Vijay

The regiment was posted in the desert sector during the Kargil war and did not see active action.

Operation Rhino

The regiment was posted for anti-terrorist operation in the plains of Assam between December 2003 and January 2005. It was awarded two GOC-in-C Commendation Cards for arresting a terrorist.

== Gallantry awards ==
The regiment has won the following gallantry awards –

- Vir Chakra – 1
- Sena Medal – 4
- Mentioned in despatches – 2
- Commendation cards – 26

== Notable Officers ==
- Brigadier Kailash Prasad Pande, MVC - raised 145 Mountain Battery (Pack)
- Captain GR Gopinath

== See also ==
- List of artillery regiments of Indian Army
