= 24th Hazara Mountain Battery (Frontier Force) =

- Active: 1851–1964
- Country: British India; India
- Branch: British Indian Army; Indian Army
- Type: Artillery
- Part of: Punjab Army (to 1895); Punjab Command
- Engagements: Second Afghan War; Second Burmese War; Hunza 1891; Chitral Expedition; World War I Third Afghan War; Afridi and Red Shirt Rebellion (1930–1); Mohmand and Bajaur Operations (1933); Waziristan campaign 1936–1939; World War II

The 24th Hazara Mountain Battery (Frontier Force) was an artillery battery of the British Indian Army.

== Formation ==
The battery was raised in 1851, at Haripur in order to help defend the Hazara District of the North West Frontier.

== Name changes ==
The battery has gone through many name changes -

- Hazara Mountain Train
- In 1856, Hazara Mountain Train Battery, Punjab Irregular Force
- In 1865, Hazara Mountain Battery, Punjab Frontier Force
- In 1876, No. 4 (Hazara) Mountain Battery, Punjab Frontier Force
- In 1901, Hazara Mountain Battery
- In 1903, 24th Hazara Mountain Battery (Frontier Force)
- In 1920, 24th Hazara Pack Battery (Frontier Force)
- In 1921, 104th (Hazara) Pack Battery (Frontier Force)
- In 1927, 4th (Hazara) Mountain Battery (Frontier Force)
- In 1932, 4th (Hazara) Mountain Battery, R.A., F.F.

== History ==
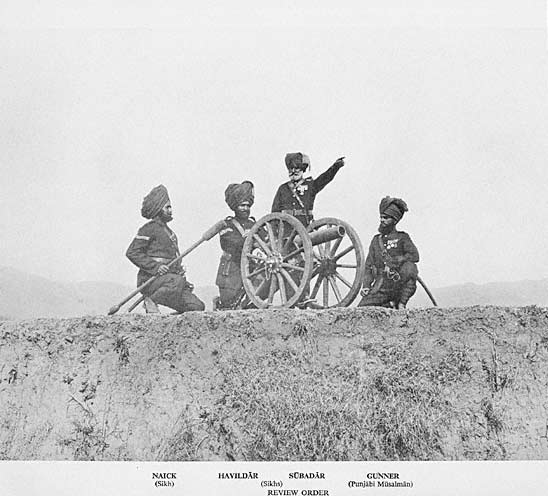
Photograph, circa 1895 showing a 7pdr Mountain gun of Hazara Battery in Hazara listing the crew's ranks in the caption.

The 4th soon saw action in numerous small campaigns on the North West Frontier. In 1878, the 4th took part in the Second Afghan War at the Battle of Ali Masjid. It later took part in the Siege of the Sherpur Cantonment in Kabul, where it remained as part of the garrison when the rest of the force marched on Kandahar. In 1885, the Battery took part in the Second Burmese War. It was at Hunza during the campaign in 1891. In 1895, the Battery was back fighting on the Frontier as part of the Chitral Expedition. To honour the visit of the Prince and Princess of Wales to Indian they took part in the Rawalpindi Parade 1905.

During World War I, the 4th left India in 1917, for East Africa where it would remain until the Armistice. Between the wars, the Battery saw service in the Third Afghan War of 1919, the Afridi and Red Shirt Rebellion (1930–1), the Mohmand and Bajaur Operations (1933), and operations against the Fakir of Ipi in the Waziristan campaign 1936–1939.

It was deployed in 1939 as part of the 22nd Mountain Regiment for the Malayan campaign of World War II. It took part in the Battle of Jitra and Singapore and entered Japanese captivity with the rest of the garrison. Following the independence of India, the regiment was allotted to the Indian Army. Shortly after it took part in the Indo-Pakistani War of 1947–1948. The battery was transferred to 56 Mountain Composite Regiment (Pack) in April 1964.

== Battle honours ==
The battery has won the following battle honours-

- Ali Masjid
- Kabul, 1879
- Afghanistan, 1878-80
- Burma 1885–87
- Chitral
- E.Africa 1917-18
- Jitra

== See also ==
- 22 Medium Regiment
- 56 Field Regiment
