= Battle of Narungombe =

- Part of East African Campaign
Date	19 July 1917
Location	German East Africa 9°59′00″S 38°50′40″E
Result	German victory

Belligerents
Germany: German East Africa	British Empire: East Africa; India; Nyasaland; Rhodesia; South Africa; Uganda

Commanders and leaders
Captain von Lieberman	Percival Scott Beves

Strength
8 companies	1,700 men

Casualties and losses
unknown	152 dead 457 wounded 15 missing
- Location within Tanzania Battle of Narungombe (Africa)

The Battle of Narungombe was fought between the German Empire and the British Empire during the East African Campaign of World War I.

== The Battle ==
By July 1917, British and Belgian troops largely controlled northern German East Africa. The British now launched an operation against the remaining Germans between Kilwa and Lindi on the southern coast of German East Africa. A German detachment of 8 companies, under command of Captain von Lieberman, built a strong defensive position with two cannons and 48 machine guns on two hills, to defend the important water well of Narungombe.

At daybreak on 19 July 1917 some 1,700 soldiers of the British Empire advanced in 3 columns towards the enemy position. The battle raged all day and several British attacks were repulsed with heavy losses. The attacks were hampered by the open terrain, German counterattacks and the tall grass, which caught fire during the battle by British shells and caused thick smoke. Nonetheless, when the night fell, some positions had been gained and consolidated by the 1st and 3rd King's African Rifles on the right of the German trenches.

During the night the German troops withdrew, having achieved their objective of making the British pay a heavy price for the seizure of the Narungombe water well. The British had lost more than 35% of their forces, with the result that no further advances could be made for the next eight weeks.

The battle honour "Narungombe" has been granted to the Ghana Regiment, the King's African Rifles and the South African 7th and 8th Infantry Regiment.
