= 75/24 Pack Howitzer =

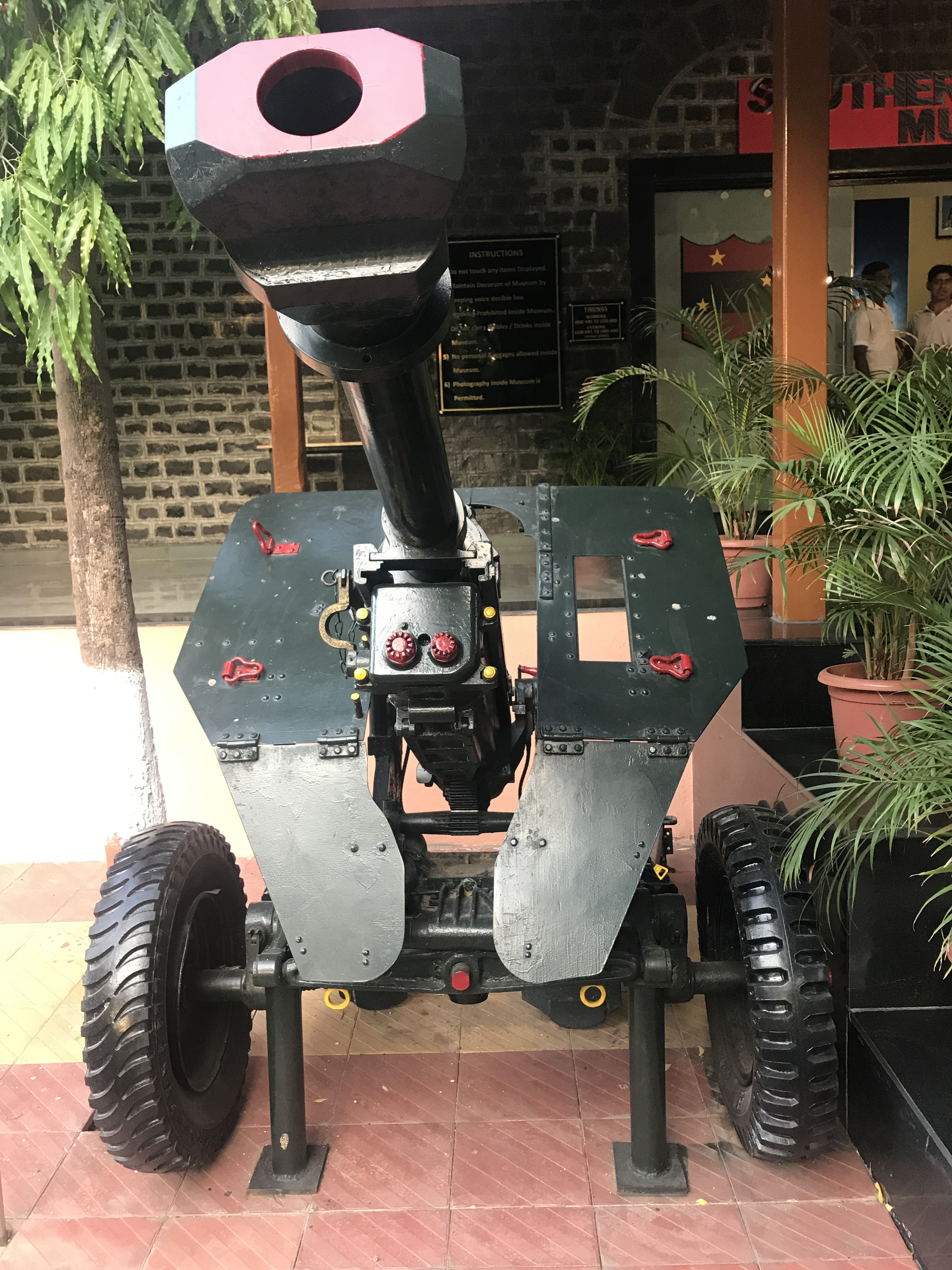
- Type: Howitzer
- Place of origin: India

Service history
- Used by: India

Production history
- Designer: ARDE
- Manufacturer: Ordnance Factory Board

Specifications
- Caliber: 75 mm (3.0 in)

The 75/24 Pack Howitzer (75/24 Indian Mountain Gun) is a towed howitzer developed in India and saw extensive use in the Indian Army.

== Development ==
The circumstances leading to the defeat during the Sino-Indian War led to a lot of introspection. The difficulties faced in the deployment of artillery on the heights led to the army to develop a light mountain gun. This programme was led by Brigadier Gurdial Singh and it delivered quick results.

By 1963, the first prototypes of the 75/24 mountain pack howitzer had been developed by the Armament Research & Development Establishment (ARDE) and other Ordnance Factories based on a Canadian design. The Solid State Physics Laboratory, Delhi was involved in the development of the VT fuze of the howitzer. This thus became the country’s first indigenously made artillery gun. The Gun Carriage Factory Jabalpur started manufacture of the guns in 1968.

== Characteristics ==
The gun is light weight and can be dis-assembled into multiple units and transported by mules in mountains as well as carried by helicopters. It weighs 983 kg and could fire up to a maximum range of 11,104 metres.

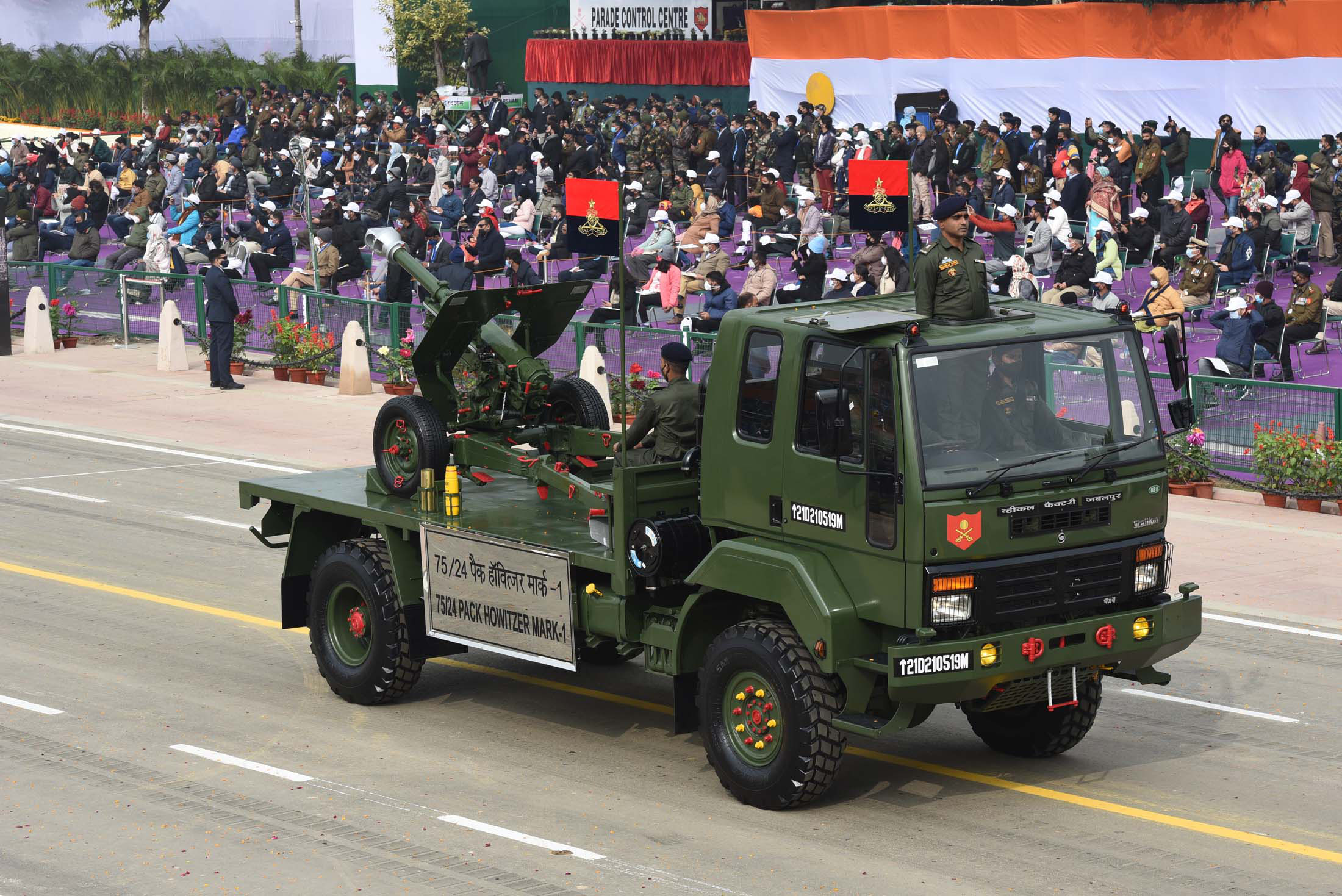
75/24 Pack Howitzer Mark-1 passes through the Rajpath, at the 73rd Republic Day Celebrations, in New Delhi on January 26, 2022.

== Operators ==
- India

The gun entered service in the Indian Army in the late 1960s and saw extensive use in the Indo-Pakistani War of 1971. The last battle it saw action in was the Kargil War.

== See also ==
- Regiment of Artillery (India)
