= 76 mm mountain gun M48 =

Yugoslavian mountain developed after WWII

M48 B-1
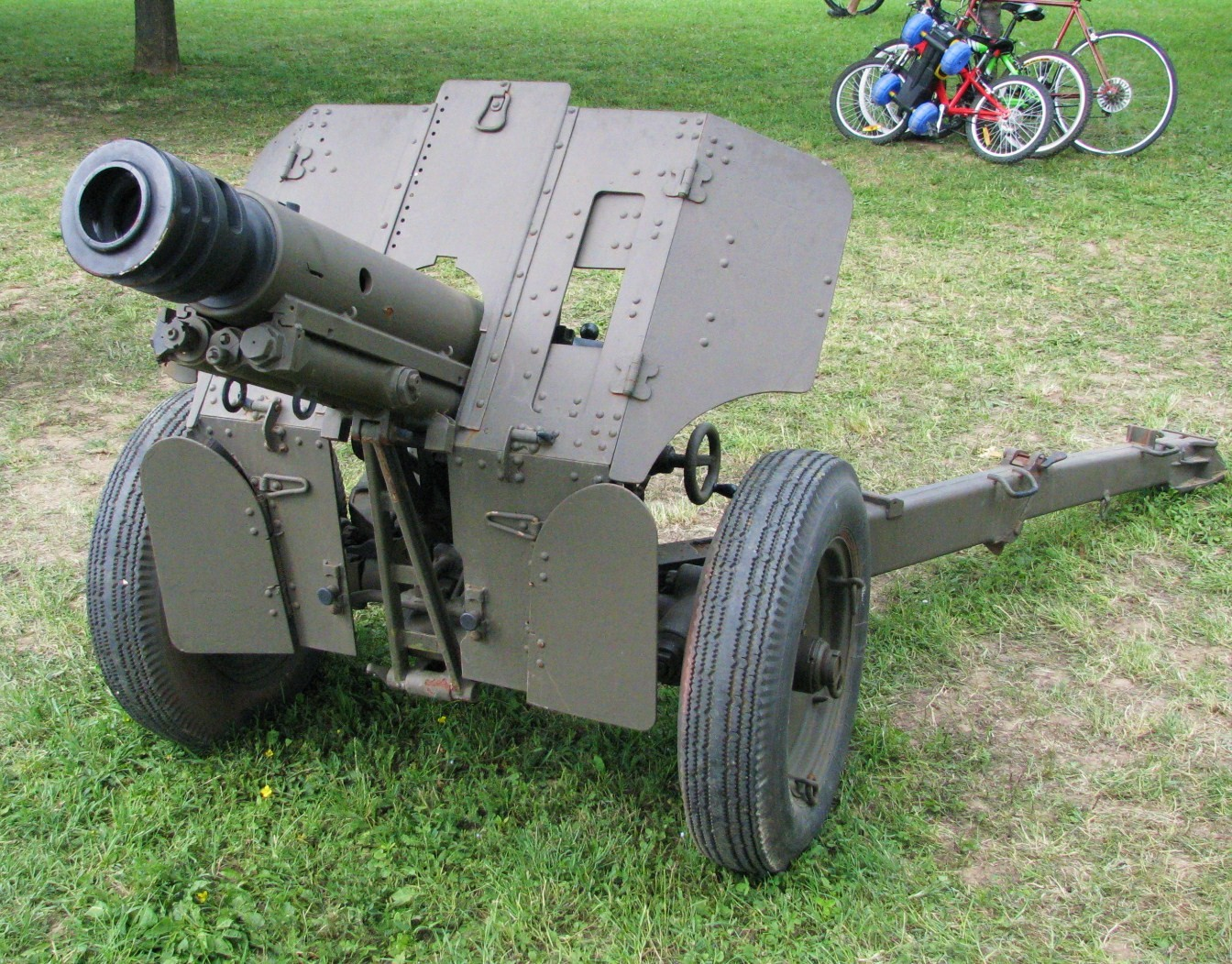
- A Croatian M48 photographed in 2011
- Type: Mountain gun
- Place of origin: Yugoslavia

Service history
- In service: 1950−1992 (Yugoslavia)
- Used by: See users
- Wars: Myanmar Civil War; Yugoslav Wars; 2001 insurgency in Macedonia

Production history
- Designed: 1947
- Manufacturer: Crvena Zastava
- Variants: See variants

Specifications (M48 B-1)
- Mass: 720 kg (1,590 lb) (standard); 705 kg (1,554 lb) (combat)
- Length: 2.42 m (7 ft 11 in)
- Barrel length: 1.178 m (3 ft 10 1/2 in)
- Width: 2.65 m (8 ft 8 in)
- Height: 1.22 m (4 ft 0 in)
- Crew: 6
- Shell: HE, HEAT, smoke
- Caliber: 76.2 mm (3.00 in)
- Carriage: Split trail
- Elevation: -15° to +45°
- Traverse: 50°
- Rate of fire: 25 rpm (sustained); 70 rpm (rapid fire)
- Muzzle velocity: 222–398 m/s (730–1,310 ft/s)
- Maximum firing range: 8,750 m (9,570 yd)

The 76 mm mountain gun M-48 (AKA the Tito Gun), was developed after the Second World War to meet the requirements of Yugoslav People's Army mountain units, it can also be used as a field gun.

== Description and history ==
The original M-48 B-1 model which was designed in 1947 and adopted by Yugoslav People's Army in 1950, it was specifically designed for mountain warfare, being able to be broken down and towed by horse or mule (with the exception of the B-1A1-I), though it also doubles as a field gun. In Yugoslav service the Zastava AR51 4×4 vehicle was used for towing before it was replaced a license-built version of the Fiat 1107.

The M48 was also a successful military export item, sold to South Asian countries such as India, Indonesia, Myanmar, and Sri Lanka, where weight instead of range was the main factor considered.

The Romanian 76.2 mm Mountain Gun Model 1982 is related to the M48, firing some of the ammunition types used by the Yugoslav gun.

== Variants ==
=== Yugoslavia/Serbia ===
There have been at least five variants of the M48:

- M48 B-1 − First production version, its fitted with pneumatic tires and a maximum towing speed of 60 km/h (37 mph). The complete gun can also towed by pack animals or broken down for transport
- M48 B-1A1-I − A variant combining the wheels and tires of the B-1 and some of the suspension components of the B-1A2 version
- M48 B-1A2 − A dual-purpose variant featuring light alloy wheels with solid rubber tires and a modified suspension, its maximum towing speed is 30 km/h (19 mph). The B-1A2 can be used as a field gun, but it cannot be disassembled for transport or towed by pack animals
- M48 B-2 − Last version produced in Yugoslavia, little is known about it
- M48 B1 A5 − A Serbian variant offered for export by Yugoimport SDPR in 2004. Specifications are almost identical to the B-1, but its operated by a crew of seven

=== Romania ===
- 76.2 mm Mountain Gun Model 1982 − A related design, it was designed to equip the Romanian Land Forces mountain units. The Model 82 is operated by a crew of seven, can be brought into action in about a minute, and broken down into eight pack-animal loads without the need of specialised tools
- 98 mm Model 93 mountain howitzer − A 98 mm (3.9 in) caliber mountain gun and possibly an improved Model 82. Both Romanian mountain guns were never exported, even though they were offered for sale in the international market

== Ammunition ==
Ammunition is of the semi-fixed type with four charges. It is based on that used for the Soviet 76 mm regimental gun M1927 which fired fixed ammunition. Ammunition types include high-explosive (HE), high-explosive anti-tank (HEAT) and smoke rounds:

- HE M55 projectile weighing 6.2 kg with a muzzle velocity between 222 and 398 m/s;
- High-explosive anti-tank (HEAT) projectile weighing 5.1 kg which will penetrate 100 mm of conventional steel armour at a range of 450 m; and
- Smoke shell WP M60 weighing 6,2 kg.
- HE M70 projectile weighing 6.2 kg with a muzzle velocity up to 398 m/s;

== Users ==
- Bosnia and Herzegovina
- Croatia − 57
- Guatemala
- India − 215
- Indonesia − 50 in 2011
- North Macedonia − 40 or 55
- Montenegro − 96 (Note: Including guns in Serbian inventory.)
- Myanmar − 100
- Papua New Guinea − 6, donated by Indonesia in 2012
- Romania − Model 82 and Model 93
- Serbia − 96 (Note: Including guns in Montenegrin inventory.)
- Sri Lanka − 14
- East Timor − 6, donated by Indonesia in 2012
- Yugoslavia − Passed on to successor states

== Photo gallery ==
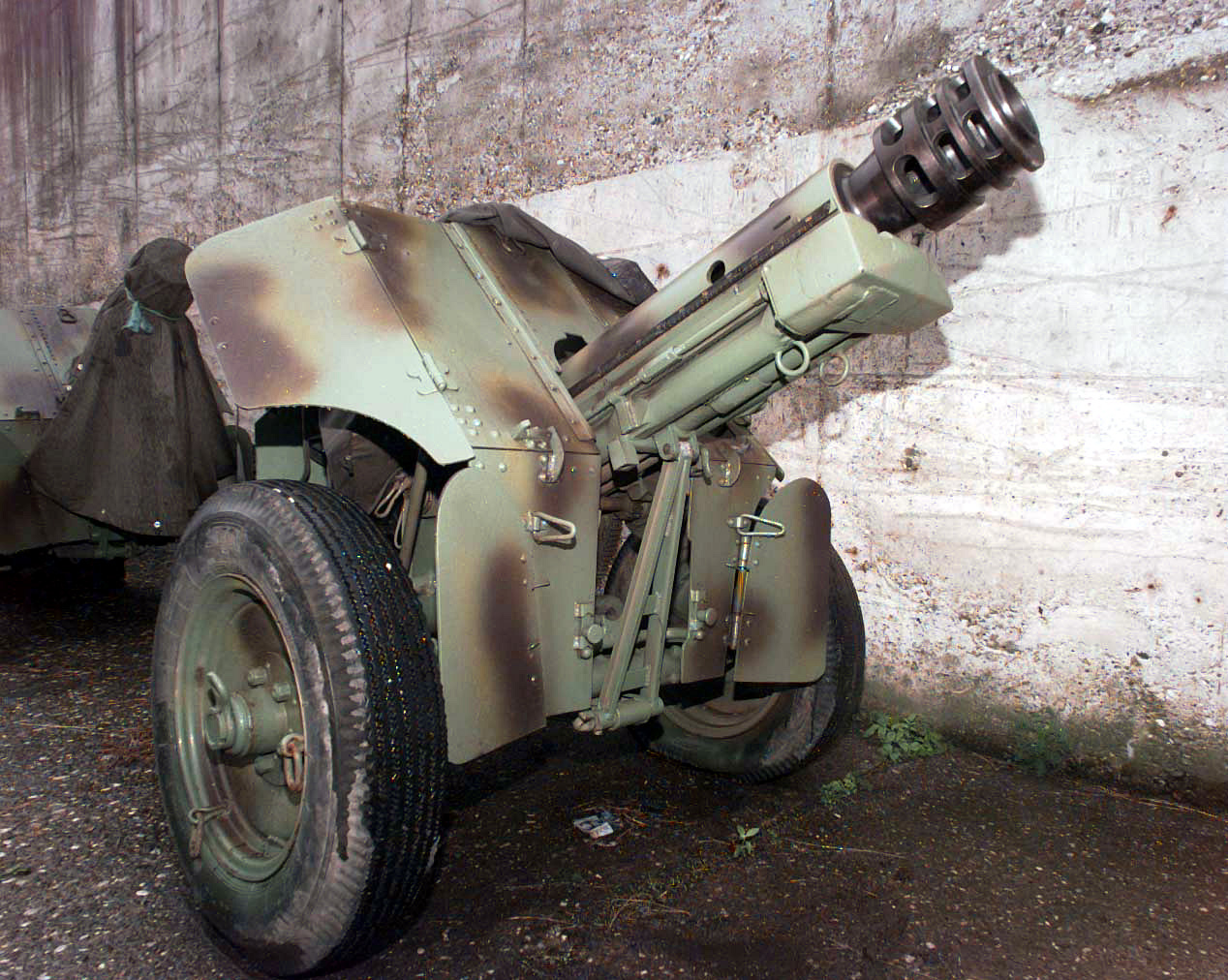
A close-up of an M48 76mm mountain gun belonging to the 28th BIH (Bosnia-Herzegovina) Division, 281st Brigade, 1st Tank Battalion, stationed in Visca, Bosnia.

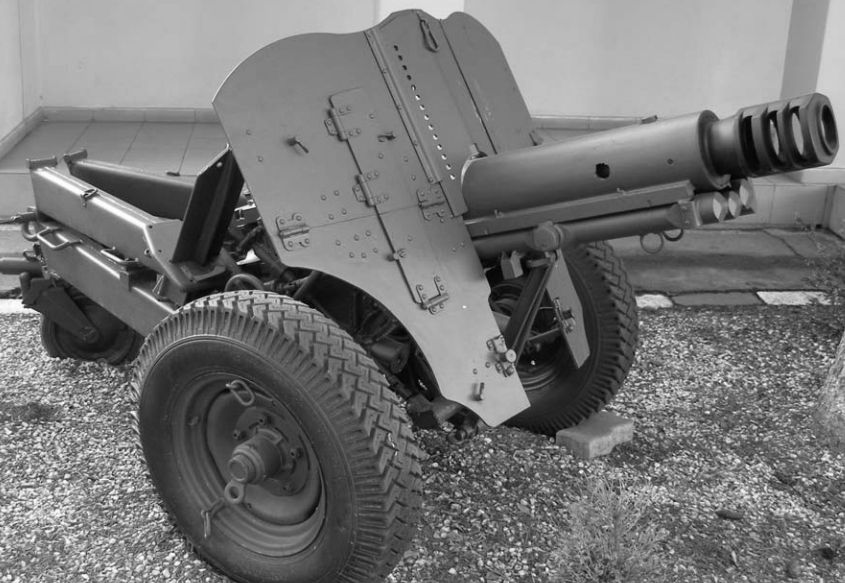
Romanian M82 76mm mountain howitzer, mady by Arsenal Reșița. Based on the "Tito Gun".
